= Suburban Christian Conference =

- Conference: IHSA
- Folded: 2014
- No. of teams: 10
- Region: Chicago suburbs, Illinois

The Suburban Christian Conference was a system of Christian schools in Chicago's suburbs organized to compete against each other athletically.

== History ==
Formerly called the Suburban Catholic Conference, the conference changed its name to the Suburban Christian Conference in 2009 and include four new schools, three of which are from the disbanding Private School League.

During the 2013-2014, seven members decided to move to the Metro Suburban Conference, effective during the 2014-2015 academic year. The remaining five high schools moved to either the Chicago Catholic League or the East Suburban Catholic Conference, effectively ended the SCC's run as one of Illinois' premier non-public athletic conferences.

== Member schools ==
- Marian Central Catholic High School, Woodstock IL
- Aurora Central Catholic High School, Aurora, IL
- Aurora Christian High School, Aurora, IL
- Guerin College Preparatory High School, River Grove, IL
- IC Catholic Prep, Elmhurst, IL
- Montini Catholic High School, Lombard, IL
- Rosary High School, Aurora, IL
- St. Francis High School, Wheaton, IL
- St. Edward Central Catholic High School (Elgin, Illinois)
- Walther Lutheran High School, Melrose Park, IL (entering in 2010-2011 season)
- Wheaton Academy, West Chicago, IL (entering in 2009-2010 season)

== Former members ==
- Driscoll Catholic High School, Addison, IL (closed after the 2008-2009 season)
