= Metro Suburban Conference =

- Conference: IHSA
- Founded: 2006
- Folded: 2024
- No. of teams: 4
- Region: Northern Illinois

The Metro Suburban Conference (MSC) was an organization of four high schools in northern Illinois, representing seven communities in that part of the state. These high schools are all members of the Illinois High School Association. The conference began competing during the 2006–07 academic year, with Elmwood Park, Fenton, Ridgewood, and Riverside-Brookfield after departing from the former Suburban Prairie Conference East Division.

Two new schools (Timothy Christian and Illiana Christian) were added for the 2009–10 academic year, both previously part of the Private School League. Glenbard South High School was added for 2010–11 following the dissolution of the Western Sun Conference.

During the 2013-2014, seven former members of the Suburban Christian Conference decided to move to the MSC, effective during the 2014-2015 academic year. The remaining five high schools moved to either the Chicago Catholic League or the East Suburban Catholic Conference, effectively ending the SCC's run as one of Illinois' premier non-public athletic conferences.

In 2018-19, Glenbard South left the conferences to join the Upstate Eight Conference while, Aurora Christian, Bishop McNamara, Rosary, and St. Francis joins the conference. Starting in 2019-20, Westmont left the Interstate Eight Conference to join the MSC following with the departure of Fenton High School.

In 2020, Guerin College Preparatory High School permanently closed due to declining enrollment, need in financial aid for students, and lower fundraising.

In 2022, Rosary left the conference to join the Girls Catholic Athletic Conference.

Nine private Catholic/Christian schools left the conference at the beginning of the 2023-24 season: Aurora Christian, Bishop McNamara, Chicago Christian, Timothy Christian, St. Edward, and Wheaton Academy formed the Chicagoland Christian Conference along with Marian Central Catholic, Christ the King, and Chicago Hope Academy while St. Francis joined the Chicago Catholic League with IC Catholic Prep and Aurora Central Catholic.

This shakeup left the conference with Elmwood Park, Ridgewood, Riverside-Brookfield, and Westmont as the only members. The conference roughed out the 2023-24 season with only 4 four members before officially disbanding at season end with Elmwood Park, Ridgewood, and Riverside-Brookfield migrating to the Upstate Eight Conference. Westmont has yet to commit to a conference.

== Final Members ==
School	Town	Nickname	Colors	Enrollment	Joined	Current Conference
Elmwood Park High School	Elmwood Park, IL	Tigers		971.5 (2023)	2006	Upstate Eight
Ridgewood High School	Norridge, IL	Rebels		797.5 (2023)	2006	Upstate Eight
Riverside-Brookfield High School	Riverside, IL	Bulldogs		1,624.5 (2023)	2006	Upstate Eight
Westmont High School	Westmont, IL	Sentinels		377 (2023)	2019	Chicago Prep

=== Previous Members ===
School	Town	Nickname	Colors	Joined	Left	Current Conference
Aurora Central Catholic High School	Aurora, IL	Chargers		2014	2023	Chicago Catholic
Aurora Christian Schools	Aurora, IL	Eagles		2018	2023	Chicagoland Christian
Bishop McNamara High School	Kankakee, IL	Fightin' Irish		2018	2023	Chicagoland Christian
Chicago Christian High School	Palos Heights, IL	Knights		2014	2023	Chicagoland Christian
Fenton High School	Bensenville, IL	Bison		2006	2019	Upstate Eight
Glenbard South High School	Glen Ellyn, IL	Raiders		2010	2018	Upstate Eight
Guerin College Preparatory High School	River Grove, IL	Crusaders & Gators		2014	2020	none*
IC Catholic Prep	Elmhurst, IL	Knights		2014	2023	Chicago Catholic
Illiana Christian High School	Dyer, IN**	Vikings		2009	2018	Greater South Shore (IHSAA)
Rosary High School	Aurora, IL	Royals		2019	2022	Girls Catholic
Saint Edward Central Catholic High School	Elgin, IL	Green Wave		2014	2023	Chicagoland Christian
Saint Francis High School	Wheaton, IL	Spartans		2018	2023	Chicago Catholic
Timothy Christian School	Elmhurst, IL	Trojans		2009	2023	Chicagoland Christian
Wheaton Academy	West Chicago, IL	Warriors		2014	2023	Chicagoland Christian

* The school closed in 2020

** The school was previously located in Lansing, IL until 2018
