= List of schools of the Roman Catholic Archdiocese of Chicago =

The following is a list of schools operated by the Roman Catholic Archdiocese of Chicago, which covers Cook and Lake counties, followed by a list of former high schools closed after 1959 and former K-8 schools closed after 1983.

An August 27, 2015 article by the Chicago Tribune refers to the Archdiocese of Chicago Office of Catholic Schools as the largest private school system in the United States.

A wave of school closures after the 2014-2015 school year caused over 200 employees to change jobs and over 1,200 pupils to change schools.

At the outset of the 2020/21 academic year, the archdiocese ran 160 elementary schools and three high schools. An additional eight Catholic elementary schools and 28 Catholic high schools that are not archdiocesan-run are located within the Archdiocese of Chicago. As of 2015, the Superintendent of Catholic Schools is Jim Rigg, Ph.D.

== History ==
The school construction boom ended when Cardinal John Cody, archbishop at the time, decided to limit construction of Catholic schools in Lake County and suburban areas in Cook County.

Between 1984 and 2004, the Office of Catholic Schools closed 148 schools and 10 school sites. By 2005, over 50% of the Chicago Archdiocese Catholic schools that existed in 1966 no longer did. In 1985, Joseph Bernardin, then the head of the archdiocese, stated that as costs increased to operate Catholic schools, it was likely merging or closure would result. In 1990 Bernardin stated that 18 schools were to close that year. He suggested that some parishes may change from having their own schools to having joint schools with other parishes, or regional schools. Ultimately 25 schools closed in 1990. In 1994 an additional 24 were shuttered. From 1990 to 2004, the number of Catholic schools shuttered exceeded 100.

In January 2018, the archdiocese announced the closure of five of its schools. In January 2020, the archdiocese announced the permanent closure of five of its other schools. As of 2022, there are 33 Catholic high schools currently operating in Cook and Lake counties, seven all-girl high schools, seven all-boys high schools and 19 co-ed high schools.

== Schools ==
=== 9–12 schools in Chicago ===
Near West and Northwest Sides

- Cristo Rey Jesuit High School
- Holy Trinity High School
- St. Ignatius College Preparatory School
- Our Lady of Tepeyac High School (girls only)
- Christ the King Jesuit College Prep High School

North Side

- DePaul College Prep – relaunch of former Gordon Tech High School, 2014
- Josephinum Academy (Near west/northwest side of Chicago) (girls only)
- Resurrection High School (girls only)

Far Northwest Side

- Saint Patrick High School (boys only)

Southwest Side

- Brother Rice High School (boys only)
- Marist High School (boys and girls)
- Mother McAuley Liberal Arts High School (girls only)
- St. Rita of Cascia High School (boys only)

South Side

- De La Salle Institute (boys and girls attend separate campuses)
- St. Francis de Sales High School
- Leo Catholic High School (boys only)
- Mount Carmel High School (boys only)

=== 9–12 schools in Cook County ===
This list excludes Chicago.

Northern Cook County

- Loyola Academy (Wilmette)
- Notre Dame College Prep (Niles) (boys only)
- Regina Dominican High School (Wilmette) (girls only)

Northwest Cook County

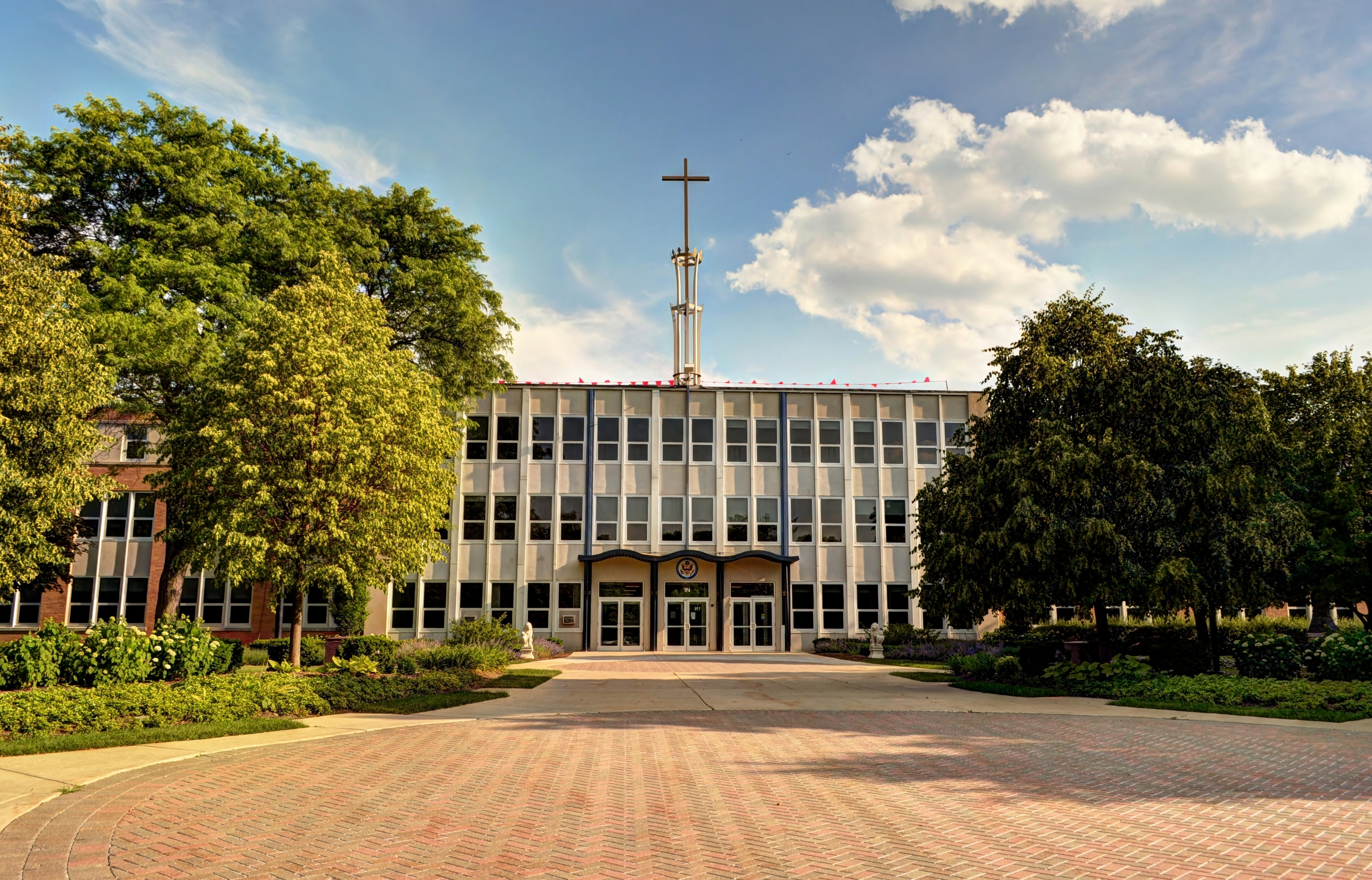
St. Viator High School

- St. Viator High School (Arlington Heights)

Western Cook County

- Fenwick High School (Oak Park)
- Nazareth Academy (La Grange Park)
- Trinity High School (River Forest) (girls only)

Southwestern Cook County

- St. Laurence High School (Burbank) (boys and girls)

Southern Cook County

- Marian Catholic High School (Chicago Heights)

==== 9–12 schools in Lake County ====
- Carmel Catholic High School (Mundelein)
- Cristo Rey St. Martin College Prep (Waukegan)
- Woodlands Academy of the Sacred Heart (Lake Forest) (girls only)

=== PK-8 schools in Chicago ===
==== PK-8 schools on the Near West and Northwest Sides ====
- Children of Peace School
- Epiphany School
- Our Lady of Grace School
- Our Lady of Tepeyac School
- St. Agnes of Bohemia School
- St. Angela School
- St. Helen School
- St. John Berchmans School
- St. Malachy School
- St. Mary of the Angels School
- St. Nicholas Ukrainian Cathedral School
- St. Patrick's Academy
- St. Pius V School
- St. Procopius School

==== PK-8 schools on the North Side ====
- Alphonsus Academy and Center for the Arts
- Frances Xavier Warde School
  - In 1994 Holy Name School, which had been facing a decline in the number of enrolled students, merged into Warde, and the former Holy Name became Warde School, Old St. Patrick's Campus so it could house the increasing number of students at Xavier.
- Immaculate Conception School (7263 West Talcott Avenue)
- Mount Carmel Academy
- Northside Catholic Academy
- Queen of All Saints School
- Queen of Angels School
- St. Andrew School
- St. Benedict School
- St. Clement School
  - St. Clement, located in Lincoln Park, is the parish school of St. Clement Church
- St. Eugene School
- St. Hilary School
- St. Josaphat School
- St. Juliana School
- St. Margaret Mary School
- St. Mary of the Angels School
  - St. Mary's, located in Bucktown, is the parish school of St. Mary of the Angels Church
- St. Mary of the Lake School
- St. Mary of the Woods School
- St. Matthias/Transfiguration School
  - The school, in the Lincoln Square community, is the parish school of the St. Matthias and Transfiguration of Our Lord parishes. the former Transfiguration School consolidated into St. Matthias in 2002; The St. Matthias building became the site of St. Matthias/Transfiguration as the Transfiguration building closed
- St. Thomas of Canterbury School

==== PK-8 schools on the Far Northwest Side ====
- St. Constance School
- St. Edward School
- St. Ferdinand School
- St. Genevieve School
- St. Monica Academy
- St. Pascal School
- St. Robert Bellarmine School
- St. Viator School
- St. William School

==== PK-8 schools on the Southwest Side ====
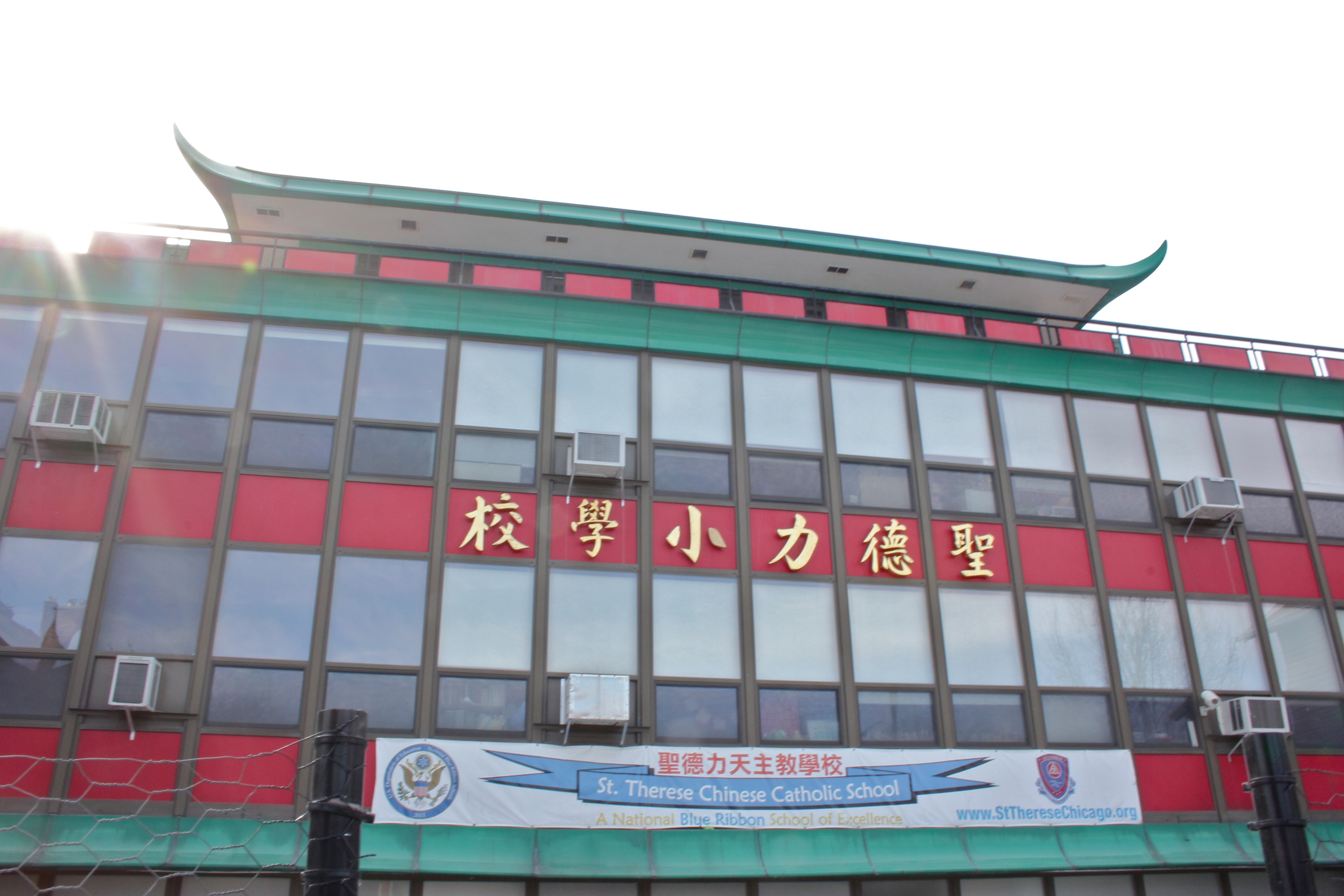
St. Therese Chinese Catholic School St. Therese Campus in Chinatown, Chicago

- Christ the King School
- Our Lady of the Snows School
- Pope John Paul II Catholic School
  - The sponsoring parishes of Pope John Paul II are Immaculate Conception Parish (2745 West 44th Street), St. Pancratius Parish, Our Lady of Fatima Parish, and Five Holy Martyrs Parish. John Paul II was formed in 1999 by the mergers of the parish schools of the four parishes; the Immaculate Conception and St. Pancriatus campus sites were immediately closed, while the Our Lady of Fatima and Five Holy Martyrs sites became a part of John Paul II. The Our Lady of Fatima site closed in 2003, leaving the Five Holy Martyrs site as the sole site for John Paul II. John Paul II, the sponsoring parishes, and the three closed sites are in the Brighton Park neighborhood.
- Queen of the Universe School
- St. Barnabas School
- St. Bede the Venerable School
- St. Cajetan School
- St. Christina School
- St. Daniel the Prophet School
- St. Gall School
- St. John Fisher School
- St. Mary Star of the Sea School
- St. Nicholas of Tolentine School
- St. Symphorosa School
- St. Therese Chinese Catholic School (traditional Chinese: 聖德力天主教學校; simplified Chinese: 圣德力天主教学校; pinyin: Shèng Délì Tiānzhǔjiào Xuéxiào; lit. 'St. Therese Catholic School') - It has a campus in Chinatown and another in Bridgeport. It was established in 1941. In 1990, almost all of the students were ethnic Chinese. In 2018 the archdiocese announced that St. Barbara School would merge into St. Therese as their respective parishes were also merging. In 2019 the St. Barbara School became the St. Therese Bridgeport campus.
- St. Walter School

==== PK-8 schools on the South Side ====
- Academy of St. Benedict the African
  - The school has two campuses, including the Laflin Campus at 6020 South Laflin and the Stewart Campus at 6547 South Stewart. The Laflin Campus is located in West Englewood. The Stewart campus is in Englewood. The school, formerly known as Englewood Catholic Academy, was formed in 1984 from the consolidation of several parish schools, including St. Benedict the African School, St. Bernard School, St. Brendan School, St. Justin Martyr School, and St. Carthage School.
- Annunciata School
- Bridgeport Catholic Academy
- Christ the King School
- Holy Angels School
- St. Ailbe School
- St. Barnabas School
- St. Columbanus School
- St. Dorothy School
- St. Elizabeth School
  - It is in proximity to the former Robert Taylor Homes.
- St. Ethelreda School
- St. Gabriel School
- St. John de la Salle Academy of Fine Arts
- St. Margaret of Scotland School
- St. Michael School
- St. Philip Neri School
- St. Sabina Academy
- St. Therese Chinese Catholic School St. Barbara Campus
- St. Thomas the Apostle School
- Visitation School

=== PK-8 schools in Cook County ===
This list excludes Chicago.

==== PK-8 schools in northern Cook County ====
- Mary, Seat of Wisdom School (Park Ridge)
  - This is the parish school for Mary, Seat of Wisdom Church.
- Our Lady of Perpetual Help (Glenview)
- Pope John XXIII School (Evanston)
  - The school is the parish school for the St. Nicholas Parish and St. Mary Parish in Evanston . The school was formed in 1986 by the merger of St. Nicholas School and St. Mary School. Pope John XXIII occupied the former St. Nicholas building, and the St. Mary building closed. In 1998 the convent was converted into a preschool .
- Sacred Heart School (Winnetka)
- St. Athanasius (St. A's) (Evanston)
- St. Catherine Laboure School (Glenview)
- SS. Faith, Hope & Charity School (Winnetka)
- St. Francis Xavier School (Wilmette)
- St. Joan of Arc School (Evanston) (Became The Academy at St. Joan of Arc, an independent school, in 2019.)
- St. John Brebeuf School (Niles)
  - The parishes of St. John Brebeuf are St. John Brebeuf (Niles), St. Isaac Jogues (Niles), St. Martha (Morton Grove), and Our Lady of Ransom. The St. Isaac Jogues School closed in 1992, the St. Martha School closed in 2000, and Our Lady of Ransom School closed in 2004.
- St. Joseph School (Wilmette) (closed in 1986, reopened in 1998)
  - The school is the parish school of St. Joseph Church.
- St. Norbert School (Northbrook)
- St. Paul of the Cross School (Park Ridge)
  - The school is the parish school of St. Paul of the Cross Church.

==== PK-8 schools in northwest Cook County ====
- Holy Family Catholic Academy (Inverness)
- Our Lady of the Wayside School (Arlington Heights)
- Queen of the Rosary School (Elk Grove Village)
- St. Emily School (Mount Prospect)
- St. James School (Arlington Heights)
- St. Raymond School (Mount Prospect)
- St. Theresa School (Palatine)

==== PK-8 schools in western Cook county ====
- Ascension School (Oak Park)
- Divine Providence School (Westchester)
- Our Lady of Charity School (Cicero)
- St. Catherine of Siena/St. Lucy School (Oak Park) - In 2020 the school had 165 students; 80 of them lived in the southern part of Austin, Chicago, and with the remainder from other parts of Chicago, Oak Park, Bellwood, Berwyn, Forest Park, Maywood, and Westchester.
- St. Celestine School (Elmwood Park)
- St. Cletus School (La Grange)
- St. Frances of Rome School (Cicero)
- St. Francis Xavier School (La Grange)
- St. Giles School (Oak Park)
- St. John of the Cross School (Western Springs)
- St. John Vianney School (Northlake)
- St. Leonard School (Berwyn)
- St. Luke School (River Forest)
- St. Mary School (Riverside)
- St. Vincent Ferrer School (River Forest)

==== PK-8 schools in southwestern Cook County ====
- Cardinal Joseph Bernardin School (Orland Hills) (school for the parishes of St. Stephen, Deacon & Martyr and St. Julie Billiart, Tinley Park, St. Elizabeth Seton Orland Hills and St. Francis of Assisi, Orland Park
  - Groundbreaking in 1999 occurred, making it the first newly built school building for the archdiocese after a 1966 project. It had a cost of $10,500,000, and 97,000 square feet (9,000 m^{2}) of space. It was scheduled to open in 2000.
- Most Holy Redeemer School (Evergreen Park)
- St. Albert the Great School (Burbank)
- St. Alexander School (Palos Heights)
- St. Alphonsus/St. Patrick School (Lemont)
- St. Catherine of Alexandria School (Oak Lawn)
- St. Christopher School (Midlothian)
- SS Cyril & Methodius School (Lemont)
- St. Damian School (Oak Forest)
- St. Gerald School (Oak Lawn)
- St. Germaine School (Oak Lawn)
- St. Linus School (Oak Lawn)
- St. Patricia School (Hickory Hills)
- White Pines Academy (Lemont)

==== PK-8 schools in southern Cook County ====
- Infant Jesus of Prague School (Flossmoor)
- St. Agnes School (Chicago Heights)
- St. Benedict School (Blue Island)

==== PK-8 schools in Lake County ====
- East Lake Academy (Lake Forest)
- School of St. Mary (Lake Forest)
- Most Blessed Trinity Academy (Waukegan)
- Prince of Peace School (Lake Villa)
- St. Anastasia School (Waukegan)
- St. Anne School (Barrington)
- St. Francis de Sales School (Lake Zurich)
- St. Gilbert School (Grayslake)
- St. Joseph School (Libertyville)
- St. Mary School (Buffalo Grove)
- St. Patrick School (Wadsworth)
- Transfiguration School (Wauconda)

=== K-8 schools in Chicago ===
==== K-8 schools on the Near West and Northwest Sides ====
- St. Ann School
- Maternity B. V. M. School
- St. Paul-Our Lady of Vilna School

==== K-8 schools on the North Side ====
- Sacred Heart Schools

==== K-8 schools on the South Side ====
- Our Lady of Guadalupe School
- Sacred Heart School

=== K-8 schools in Cook County ===
This list excludes Chicago.

==== K-8 schools in northern Cook County ====
- St. Athanasius School (Evanston)

==== K-8 schools in northwest Cook County ====
- St. John the Evangelist School (Streamwood)

==== K-8 schools in southwest Cook County ====
- St. George School (Tinley Park)
- St. Michael School (Orland Park)
- St. Patricia School (Hickory Hills)
- St. Linus School (Oak Lawn)

==== K-8 schools in Lake County ====
- St. Gilbert School (Grayslake)

=== K-7 schools ===
Chicago, south side

- Immaculate Conception School

=== 5–8 schools ===
(Chicago, Near West and Northwest)

- Chicago Jesuit Academy (boys only)

=== 6–8 schools ===
(Chicago, Southwest)

- San Miguel School – Back of the Yards Campus (opened in 1995)

=== PK-3 schools ===
(Chicago, North Side)

- Cardinal Bernardin Early Childhood Center
  - Bernardin ECC has one campus, St. Teresa of Avila at 1940 North Kenmore at Armitage. The other campus at St. Bonaventure at 1651 West Diversey at Paulina closed in 2022. Bernardin ECC opened in 1998 in the former campuses of Saint Bonaventure School (closed in 1990) and St. Teresa of Avila School (closed in 1996)

=== PK-2 schools ===
(Chicago, North Side)

- Immaculate Conception School (1431 North Park Avenue, closed in 1985, reopened in 2002)

=== K-1 schools ===
(Cook County, excluding Chicago, far northwest)

- Holy Family Catholic Academy (Inverness)

=== PK-K schools ===
(Chicago, Near West/Northwest)

- Old St. Mary's School

== Former schools ==
The enrollment of Chicago Archdiocese Catholic schools was over 95,000 circa 2012. In 2020 this figure declined to circa 71,000, and that year the archdiocese closed five grade schools. The number of schools open declined to 209 in 2020.

=== Former high schools ===
==== Former high schools in Chicago ====
Closure date not stated:

- St. Casimir High School (St. Casimir Academy changed name to Maria High School in 1952. St. Casimir Commercial High School changed name to Our Lady of Tepeyac High School in 1991.)
- St. Catherine of Siena (See 1977 for Siena Catholic High School)

Closed in 1960:

- St. Dominic High School
- St. Philomena Commercial High School

Closed in 1961:

- St. Josaphat Commercial High School
- St. Malachy High School
- St. Martin Commercial High School

Closed in 1962:

- Corpus Christi High School (succeeded by Hales Franciscan High School)
- Loretto High School (Englewood)
- St. Clement Commercial High School

Closed in 1966:

- St. Alphonsus Commercial High School

Closed in 1967:

- Sacred Heart High School (May Street)
- St. Elizabeth High School

Closed in 1968:

- DePaul University Academy
- St. Michael High School

Closed in 1969:

- Providence High School
- St. Columbkille High School
- St. Mel High School
- Saints Peter and Paul High School
- St. Pius V Commercial High School

Closed in 1970:

- Cardinal Stritch High School
- St. Patrick High School for Girls (West Side)
- St. Phillip Basilica High School

Closed in 1972:

- Loretto Academy (Woodlawn)
- Mercy High School

Closed in 1973:

- Little Flower High School

Closed in 1974:

- Angel Guardian High School

Closed in 1976:

- St. Mary High School

Closed in 1977:

- St. Paul High School
- St. Stanislaus Kostka High School
- Siena High School

Closed in 1978:

- St. Michael Central Catholic High School

Closed in 1979:

- St. Sebastian High School

Closed in 1980:

- Heart of Mary High School
- St. Augustine High School
- St. Thomas the Apostle High School

Closed in 1981:

- St. Ann High School
- St. Procopius High School

Closed in 1982:

- Immaculata High School
- Mercy Mission High School

Closed in 1983:

- Aquinas Dominican High School

Closed in 1985:

- St. Mary of Perpetual Help High School (coed)

Closed in 1988:

- Holy Family Academy (girls)
- Mendel Catholic High School
- Unity High School (girls) (merged into St. Martin De Porres Academy, building closed)
- Visitation High School
- Willobrord Catholic High School (coed) (merged into St. Martin De Porres Academy, building closed)

Closed in 1989:

- Alvernia High School

Closed in 1990:

- Archbishop Quigley Preparatory Seminary (South) (boys only)

Closed in 1993:

- Academy of the Sacred Heart (girls) (as of 2007 the building is used by Sacred Heart Schools)

Closed in 1994:

- Cathedral High School (coed)

Closed in 1996:

- St. Joseph High School (coed)

Closed in 1997:

- St. Martin De Porres Academy (coed)

Closed in 1999:

- Archbishop Weber High School (boys)
- Academy of Our Lady (Longwood Academy) (girls)

Closed in 2001:

- Madonna High School
- St. Barbara High School

Closed in 2002:

- Lourdes High School (girls) (students accepted at De La Salle Institute West Campus)

Closed in 2003:

- Good Counsel High School (girls)

Closed in 2007:

- Archbishop Quigley Preparatory Seminary North (boys only)

Closed in 2013:

- Maria High School (girls only)
- St. Gregory the Great High School
- St. Scholastica Academy (girls only)

Closed in 2016:

- Notre Dame High School for Girls (girls only)

==== Former high schools in Cook County ====
This list excludes Chicago. Closed in 1960:

- Wilmette Mallinckrodt High School (Wilmette)

Closed in 1968:

- Aurora Roncalli High School for Boys and Madonna Catholic High School consolidated to form Aurora Central Catholic High School.

Closed in 1969:

- St. George High School (Evanston)
- St. Patrick Academy (Des Plaines)

Closed in 1970:

- Marywood High School (Evanston)

Closed in 1983:

- Mother of Sorrows High School (Blue Island)

Closed in 1987:

- Sacred Heart of Mary High School (Rolling Meadows) (absorbed by Saint Viator High School)

Closed in 1991:

- Saint Vincent de Paul High School Seminary (boys) (Lemont, Illinois)

Closed in 1994

- Saint Louise de Marillac High School (girls) (Northfield) (absorbed by Loyola Academy, building closed)

Closed in 2004:

- Holy Cross High School (boys) (River Grove) (students accepted at Guerin College Preparatory High School)

Closed in 2005:

- Immaculate Heart of Mary High School (absorbed by St. Joseph High School) (Westchester)

Closed in 2016

- Seton Academy, South Holland.

Closed in 2017

- Queen of Peace High School (girls) (Burbank) students accepted at St. Laurence High School

Closed in 2020

- Guerin College Preparatory High School (River Grove)

Closed in 2021

- St. Joseph High School (Westchester)

=== Former K-8 schools ===
==== Former K-8 schools in Chicago ====
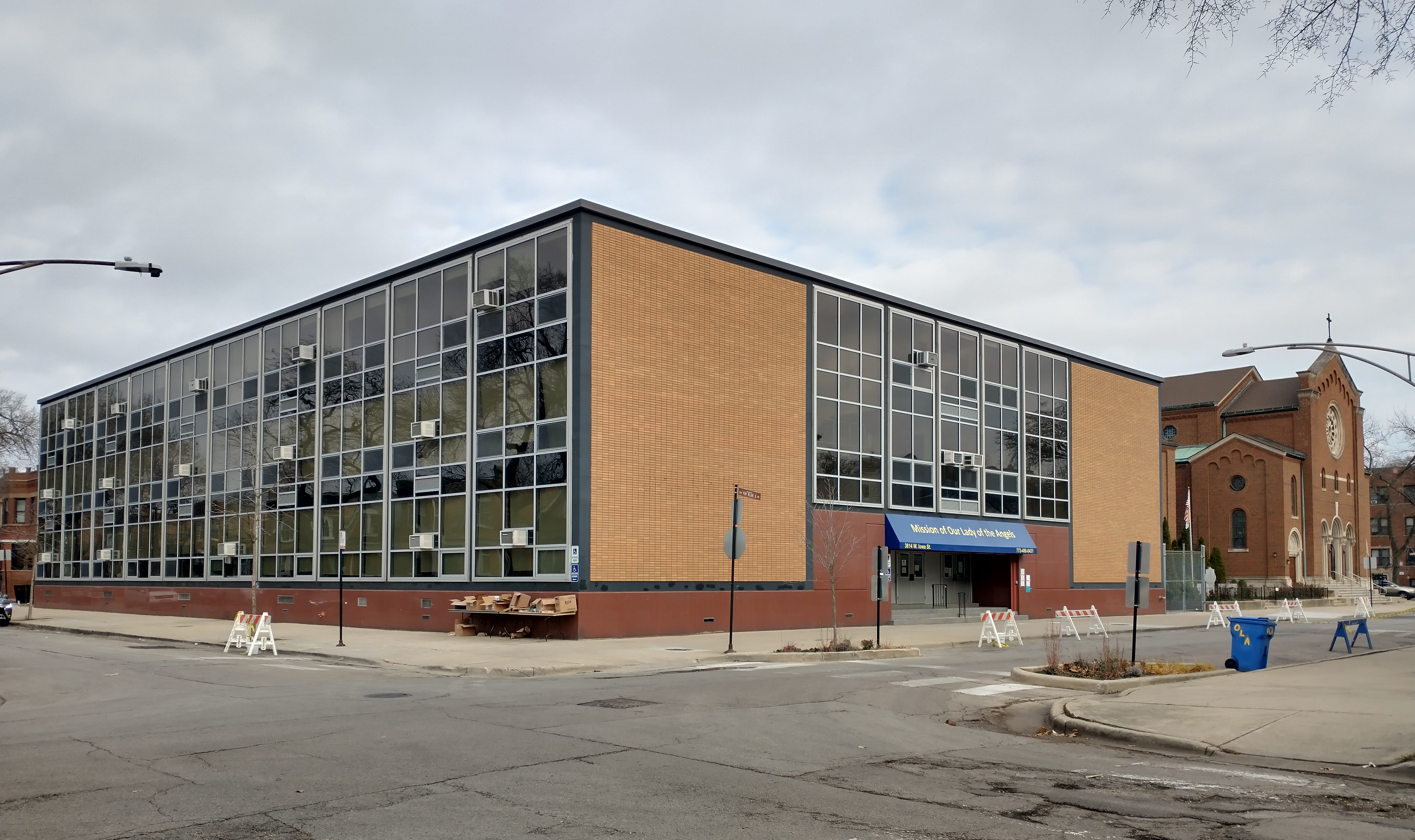
The rebuilt campus of Our Lady of the Angels School

Closed in 1984:

- Assumption B.V.M. (2817 West 24th Street)
- St. Kevin School
- St. Bernard School (consolidated into Englewood Catholic Academy, now St. Benedict the African Academy; building closed; as of 2007 the site is used as a campus for St. Benedict the African)
- St. Brendan School (consolidated into Englewood Catholic Academy, now St. Benedict the African Academy; building closed)
- St. Carthage School (consolidated into Englewood Catholic Academy, now St. Benedict the African Academy; building closed)
- Holy Rosary School (merged with St. Salomea into St. Mark the Evangelist School, building closed)
- Immaculate Conception School (8739 S. Exchange Street) (merged with St. Mary Magdalen and S. S. Peter & Paul to form Jesus, Our Brother, building closed) (Jesus, Our Brother closed in 1994)
- S. S. Peter & Paul (2938 East 91st Street) (Merged with St. Mary Magdalen and Immaculate Conception to form Jesus, Our Brother, building closed) (Jesus, Our Brother closed in 1994)

Closed in 1985:

- St. George School (911 West 32nd Place) (Consolidated into Bridgeport Catholic Academy)
- S. S. Peter and Paul (12255 South Emerald Street) (merged with Assumption, BVM, 12238 South Parnell)

Closed in 1986:

- All Saints School
- Our Lady of Hungary School
- St. Frances Xavier Cabrini School
- St. Mel School

Closed in 1987:

- St. Agnes School
- St. Augustine School
- St. George School (9536 South Ewing Street)
- Our Lady of Vilna (merged with St. Paul to form St. Paul/Our Lady of Vilna, building closed)

Closed in 1988:

- Notre Dame de Chicago School
- St. Mary School
- St. Francis of Assisi (merged with Our Lady of the Angels School, building closed) (Our Lady of the Angels closed in 1999)

Closed in 1990:

- Holy Trinity School
- S. S. Peter and Paul School (3737 South Paulina Street)
- Sacred Heart of Jesus School
- Saint Bonaventure School (building was used by the Cardinal Bernadin Early Childhood Center starting in 1998, closed in 2022)
- St. Charles Lwanga School (opened in 1971 from consolidation of St. Cecelia and St. Anne)
- St. Fidelis School
- St. Francis de Paula
- St. John of God
- St. Mark the Evangelist (opened in 1984 from consolidation of St. Salomea and Holy Rosary)
- St. Peter Canisius School (closed 1990)
- St. Sebastian School
- Assumption BVM (12238 South Parnell) (merged with St. Catherine of Genoa; consolidated school closed in 1999)
- Holy Cross (consolidated with S. S. Cyril/Methodius and Clara, renamed St. Gelasius, building closed)
- St. Ludmilla (merged with St. Casimir, building closed)
- Academy St. Benedict The African – May St. Campus (site closure)
- Bridgeport Catholic Academy – Early Childhood East (site closure)
- Bridgeport Catholic Academy – Early Childhood West (site closure)

Closed in 1991:

- St. Roman School
- St. Veronica School (consolidated into Resurrection Catholic Academy, building closed)

Closed in 1992:

- Providence of God School
- St. Francis de Sales School

Closed in 1993:

- Corpus Christi School
- St. Hedwig School
- St. Kilian School
- St. Michael the Archangel School
- St. Wenceslaus School
- Our Lady of Lourdes School (consolidated with Blessed Sacrament, Central Park; building closed)

Closed in 1994:

- Holy Name Cathedral Elementary School (building became a part of Francis Xavier Warde School)
- Jesus, Our Brother School
- Little Flower School
- Our Lady of Pompeii School
- St. Anselm School
- St. Laurence School
- St. Rita of Cascia School
- St. Ignatius School (consolidated into Northside Catholic Academy, campus closed)
- St. Jerome School (consolidated into Northside Catholic Academy, campus closed)
- St. Timothy School (consolidated into Northside Catholic Academy, campus closed)

Closed in 1995:

- St. John Bosco School

Closed in 1996:

- St. Stephen School
- St. Teresa of Avila School (building has been used by Cardinal Bernadin Early Childhood Center since 1998)

Closed in 1997:

- St. Joachim School

Closed in 1998:

- Our Lady Help of Christians School (closed 1998)
- Our Lady of Sorrows School
- St. Adrian School
- St. Anthony School
- St. Basil School
- Our Lady of the Westside – Precious Blood Campus (site closure)

Closed in 1999:

- Assumption BVM/ St. Catherine of Genoa School
- Our Lady of the Angels School
- Our Lady of Peace School
- Five Holy Martyrs School (consolidated into Pope John Paul II Catholic School)
- Immaculate Conception School (consolidated into Pope John Paul II Catholic School in 1999, building closed)
- Our Lady of Fatima School (consolidated into Pope John Paul II Catholic School) (the building site closed in 2003)
- St. Pancratius School (consolidated into Pope John Paul II Catholic School in 1999, building closed)

Closed in 2000:

- Bridgeport Catholic Academy – North Campus (site closure)

Closed in 2001:

- St. Columba
- St. Leo the Great
- Bridgeport Catholic Academy – West Campus (site closure)
- Children of Peace – Holy Family (site closure)
- McKinley Park – St. Maurice Campus (site closure)
- Northside Catholic Academy – St. Gregory Campus (site closure)

Closed in 2002:

- Blessed Sacrament / Our Lady of Lourdes School
  - It was in Lawndale. Its peak enrollment was circa 250, and in the year it closed it had 227 students. Parents led a campaign to oppose the closure, arguing that the archdiocese had asked for a fundraising, which the parents did, but moved to close it anyway.
- Holy Innocents School
- Holy Name of Mary School
- McKinley Park Catholic School
- St. Ambrose School
- St. Clare do Montefalco School
- St. Denis School
- St. Gelasius School
- St. James School
- St. Joseph School (1065 North Orleans Street)
- St. Joseph School (4831 South Hermitage Street Chicago
- St. Michael School
- Transfiguration School (consolidated with St. Matthias, building closed)

Closed in 2003:

- Our Lady of Mercy School
- St. Thaddeus School
- Pope John Paul II – Our Lady of Fatima Site (site closure)

Closed in 2004:

- St. Mark School
- St. Stanislaus Bishop and Martyr School
  - In the 2003-2004 school year, its enrollment was around 170.

Closed in 2005:

- St. Bride School
- St. Thomas More

Closed in 2007:

- Our Lady of the Westside School

Closed in 2009:

- Our Lady of the Gardens School
- St. Priscilla School

Closed in 2012:

- Nativity B.V.M. School

Closed in 2013:

- St. Helena of the Cross School

Closed in 2015:

- St. Hyacinth Basilica School
- St. Ladislaus School
- St. Rene Goupil School
- St. Turibius School
- St. Agatha Catholic Academy
- St. Columbanus School - Park Manor - Merged with St. Dorothy to form a new school
- St. Dorothy School - Chatham - Merged with St. Columbanus to form a new school

Closed in 2016:

- St. Cornelius School
- St. Florian School
- St. Tarcissus School

Closed in 2018:

- St. Michael the Archangel School in the city's South Chicago neighborhood - It had 80 students in 2018.

Closed in 2019:

- Santa Lucia School
- St. Barbara School (Bridgeport) In 2018 the archdiocese announced that St. Barbara School would merge into St. Therese as their respective parishes were also merging. In 2019 the St. Barbara School became the St. Therese Bridgeport campus.

Closed in 2020:

- St. Thecla School

Closed in 2022:

- Cardinal Bernadin Early Childhood Center (Bonaventure Campus)

Closed in 2023:

- St. Bartholomew School

Closed in 2026:

- Sts. Bruno and Richard School
- St. Francis Borgia School
- St. Jerome School
- St. Stanislaus Kostka School

==== Former K-8 schools in Cook County ====
Closed in 1984:

- Alexine Academy (LaGrange Park) (operated as private)
- St. John Chrysostom School (Bellwood)

Closed in 1986:

- St. Mary School (Evanston (consolidated with St. Nicholas in Evanston to form Pope John XXIII School; building closed)

Closed in 1987:

- St. Gerard Majella School (Markham)
- Ascension/ St. Susanna School (Harvey) (merged with St. John Baptist to form Mary of Nazareth of Harvey, building closed)

Closed in 1988:

- St. Dionysus School (Cicero)
- St. Joseph School (Chicago Heights)

Closed in 1989:

- Mother of Sorrows Boarding School (Blue Island) (operated as private)

Closed in 1990:

- Mount Carmel School (Chicago Heights)
- Seven Holy Founders (Calumet Park)
- St. Rosalie School (Harwood Heights)

Closed in 1992:

- St. Anthony School (Cicero)
- St. Charles Borromeo School (Melrose Park)
- St. James School (Maywood)
- St. Isaac Jogues School (Niles (students went to Our Lady of Ransom and St. John Brebeuf School, so this is considered a merger, building closed)

Closed in 1996:

- St. Joseph the Worker School (Wheeling)
- St. Pius X School (Stickney)

Closed in 1997:

- St. Gertrude School (Franklin Park)

Closed in 2000:

- St. Martha School (Morton Grove)

Closed in 2001:

- St. Emeric School (Country Club Hills)
- St. Hugh School (Lyons)
- St. Isidore, The Farmer School (Blue Island)
  - The archdiocese determined the school was too expensive to maintain.
- St. Simeon School (Bellwood)

Closed in 2002:

- Mary of Nazareth School (Harvey)
- Mary Queen of Heaven School (Cicero)
- Our Lady of Mount Carmel School (Melrose Park)
- St. James School (Sauk Village)

Closed in 2003:

- St. Anne School (Hazel Crest)
- St. Eulalia School (Maywood)
- St. Lambert School (Skokie)
- St. Philip the Apostle School (Northfield)

Closed in 2004:

- Holy Ghost School (South Holland) (students accepted to Christ Our Savior)
- Our Lady of Knock School (Calumet City) (students accepted to Christ Our Savior)
- Our Lady of Ransom School (Niles)
  - OLR students were absorbed by St. John Brebeuf School, St. Paul of the Cross School, and Mary, Seat of Wisdom School
- Queen of Apostles School (Riverdale) (students accepted to Christ Our Savior)
- St. Andrew of the Apostle (Calumet City) (building reopened for Christ Our Savior School – East Campus)
- St. Jude the Apostle School (South Holland) (building reopened for Christ Our Savior School – West Campus)
- St. Victor School (Calumet City) (students accepted to Christ Our Savior)

Closed in 2005:

- Divine Savior School (Norridge)

Closed in 2006:

- Our Lady of Loretto School (Hometown)
- St. Stanislaus Bishop and Martyr Elementary School (Posen)
  - It opened circa 1893. Its final enrollment was 142, and the small number of students was the reason for its closure..

Closed in 2009:

- St. Beatrice School (Schiller Park)
- St. Mary Of Czestochowa School (Cicero)

Closed in 2010:

- Christ Our Savior School, East Campus in Calumet City (consolidated with West Campus in South Holland

Closed in 2012:

- St. Barbara School (Brookfield) The school only had 64 students enrolled.
- St. Domitilla School (Hillside)

Closed in 2013:

- St. Bernardine School (Forest Park)
- St. Kieran School (Chicago Heights)

Closed in 2014:

- St. Bernadette School (Evergreen Park)

Closed in 2015:

- Our Lady of Destiny (Des Plaines) - Merged into St. Zachary School.
- St. Lawrence O'Toole School (Matteson) - The church also closed, and the archdiocese put the entire complex on the market for $2,700,000 in 2023.
- St. Peter School (Skokie) - It opened circa 1865, and closed in 2015 after a shortfall in money and a decline in the student population.

Closed in 2016:

- St. Edmund School (Oak Park)

Closed in 2017:

- St. Joseph School (Homewood) - It had 64 students at the time of closure.
- St. Louis De Montfort School (Oak Lawn) - It had 133 students at the time of closure.

Closed in 2018: None of the schools had 150 or more students.

- Holy Cross School in north suburban Deerfield
- Incarnation School (Palos Heights)
- Our Lady of the Ridge Catholic School in southwest suburban Chicago Ridge
- St. Cyprian School in northwest suburban River Grove

Closed in 2019:

- Divine Infant Jesus School: The archdiocese cited a decline in enrollment and financing and desired to operate only one parish school once Divine Infant Jesus Church and Divine Providence Church (both churches are now known as Mary, Mother of Divine Grace Parish) united as one parish in July 2019 as a part of the Renew My Church initiative. A majority of the students transferred to Divine Providence School.

Closed in 2020: - The archdiocese cited a decline in the student population and budgeting problems.

- St. Colette School in Rolling Meadows - The student population from circa 2017 to 2020 declined by 97. In 2020 its budget deficit was $500,000.
- St. Jane de Chantal School in Chicago’s Garfield Ridge neighborhood. - In the 2015-2016 school year, the school had 281 students. This figure declined to 272, 245, and then 202 in subsequent school years. In total, from circa 2017 to 2020 the student population declined by 92. In the 2018-2019 school year it had 202 students and 20 employees, with 14 of them in the faculty. The archdiocese stated that the school could stay open if the community raised $357,000, but the community did not do so.
- St. Joseph School in Round Lake - The student population from circa 2016 to 2020 declined by 92. The archdiocese asked if there were interested benefactors, but the archdiocese was unsuccessful.
- St. Louise de Marillac School in LaGrange Park - The student population from circa 2019 to 2020 declined by 28. The archdiocese asked if there were interested benefactors, but the archdiocese was unsuccessful.
- St. Maria Goretti School in Schiller Park - From circa 2017 to 2020 the student population declined by 73. The archdiocese stated that the school could remain open if it had 150 students for 2019-2020, but the student population was below that.

Closed in 2021:

- Christ Our Savior School (West Campus in South Holland)
- Sacred Heart School (Melrose Park)
- St. Anne School (Lansing)
- St. Joseph School (Summit)

Closed in 2024:

- St. Odilo School (Berwyn)
- St. Zachary School (Des Plaines)

Closed in 2025:

- St. Alphonsus Liguori School (Prospect Heights)
- St. Thomas of Villanova School (Palatine)

Closed in 2026:

- St. Hubert School (Hoffman Estates)
- Queen of Martyrs School (Evergreen Park)

==== Former K-8 schools in Lake County ====
Closed in 1984:

- St. Bartholomew School (Waukegan (consolidated into Lakeshore Catholic Academy, building closed)

Closed in 1990:

- Holy Rosary School (North Chicago)

Closed in 2014:

- St. Maria del Popolo School (Mundelein)
- St. James School (Highwood)
  - Merged with Holy Cross School of Deerfield, Illinois

Closed in 2015:

- Holy Cross School (Deerfield) - Merged into St. James School in Highwood

Closed in 2016:

- St. Peter School (Antioch)

Closed in 2019:

- St. Mary of Annunciation School (Mundelein)

Closed in 2020:

- St. Joseph School (Round Lake)

Closed in 2024:

- St. Bede School (Ingleside)

Closed in 2026:

- Our Lady of Humility School (Beach Park)

=== Former 5-8 schools ===
- San Miguel School – Gary Comer Campus (located in the Austin neighborhood ) (opened fall 2002, closed in 2012)

== See also ==
- History of education in Chicago
