= Private School League =

- Conference: IHSA
- Founded: 1930
- Folded: 2009
- No. of teams: 27
- Region: Northeast Illinois (Bureau, DuPage, Kane, Lake, LaSalle, McHenry, Will and Winnebago counties)

Locations
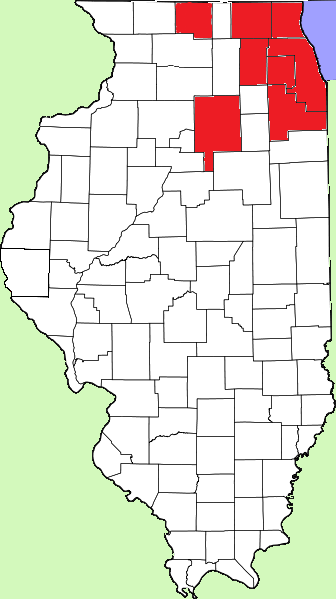
- The Private School League within Illinois

The Private School League was a high school conference in northeastern Illinois. The conference participated in athletics and activities in the Illinois High School Association. The conference comprised 28 small private schools, with enrollments between 50 and 400 students, in Bureau, DuPage, Kane, Lake, LaSalle, McHenry, Will, and Winnebago counties.

== History ==
In December 1930, five private religious and secular schools in the Chicago area came together to create an athletic conference for non-public schools. The five schools weren Chicago Christian of Palos Heights, Chicago Luther Institute, Wheaton Academy, Chicago Central YMCA, and the Pullman Free School of Manual Training in Chicago. Initially the conference was organized for basketball only; however, as time progressed, the conference added other sports.

The league soon expanded with other secular and private academies. In 1931, Pullman School withdrew from the league. In 1935, Chicago Harvard School and Chicago North Park Academy joined, as did Francis W. Parker School and Woodstock Todd Seminary in 1936. Another addition to the league occurred in 1938, with Chicago Latin School, Chicago University High School, and the high school program of Concordia Teachers College joining. Chicago Central YMCA withdrew in 1939, leaving the league with a total of 10 teams as the 1940 school year commenced.

Luther Institute split into Luther North and Luther South in 1953, and in 1954, Elgin Academy, Glenwood School, and North Shore Country Day School joined the conference. In 1955, Walther Lutheran High School (Melrose Park) joined the league. With these additions, the league divided into two divisions with a championship game between the division winners. The championship game was dropped after 1957 but the division set up remained until 1966 when 6 schools left to form the Independent School League. Those schools were Chicago Latin, Elgin Academy, Francis W. Parker School, Glenwood School for boys, Morgan Park Academy, and North Shore Country Day. Morgan Park Academy had joined in 1960, however, it was included with the six teams that exited the conference and with Chicago Harvard leaving the conference in 1962, it left the league with a total of seven teams at the beginning of the 1967 school year.

North Park Academy departed the conference in 1969, Wheaton Academy left in 1971. To replace them, Little Flower Academy and Providence Catholic High School were added in 1971. Aurora Central Catholic High School was added in 1973 when Little Flower Academy closed, keeping the league at seven members as the 1970s came to a close.

Nazareth Academy joined in 1980, and Wheaton Academy returned to the league in 1984 for just the one season. In 1987, Providence Catholic High School left while in 1995, St. Gregory and Peru St. Bede joined. Aurora Central Catholic High School left the conference in 1997 and in 1998, St. Gregory and Peru St. Bede left the league and Aurora Christian High School joined. In 2001, Nazareth Academy left but Rockford Christian High School, Rockford Christian Life High School, and Rockford Lutheran High School became members of the league. In 2003, Rockford Christian and Lutheran left and Lake Forest Academy joined. In 2005, Seton Academy became the final addition to the league, although Wheaton Academy, a team that had been part of the league two times before, returned in 2007. As the conference came to a conclusion in 2009, it had ten teams, most of which joined the Suburban Christian Conference, Metro Suburban Conference, Northeastern Athletic Conference, or Independent School League.

== All-Time Membership ==
The Private School League had 29 teams throughout its history, the list of schools encompasses all of the schools which were once a part of the conference.

| School | Location | Mascot | Colors | Year Joined | Year Left | IHSA Classes A/AA | IHSA Football Class |
|---|---|---|---|---|---|---|---|
| Chicago Christian; High School | Palos Heights, IL | Knights | Purple, Gold | 1930 | 2003 | 2A | 4A |
| Chicago Luther; Institute | Chicago, IL | Wildcats | Blue, Gold | 1930 | 1953 | - | - |
| Wheaton Academy | West Chicago, IL | Warrior | Maroon, White | 1930; 1984; 2007 | 1971; 1985; 2009 | 3A | 4A |
| Chicago Harvard; School | Chicago, IL | Hurricanes | Black, Gold | 1935 | 1962 | - | - |
| Chicago North; Park Academy | Chicago, IL | Vikings | Royal Blue, Gold | 1935 | 1969 | - | - |
| Francis W. Parker; High School | Chicago, IL | Colonels | Blue, White | 1936 | 1966 | - | - |
| Woodstock Todd; Seminary | Woodstock, IL | Red Raiders | Red, White | 1936 | 1954 | - | - |
| Chicago Latin; School | Chicago, IL | Romans | Blue, Orange | 1938 | 1966 | - | - |
| Chicago University; High School | Chicago, IL | Maroons | Maroon, White | 1938 | 2009 | 2A | - |
| Concordia; High School | River Forest, IL | Cougars | Maroon, Gold | 1938 | 2009 | - | - |
| Luther North; High School | Chicago, IL | Wildcats | Blue, Gold | 1953 | 2009 | 1A | 2A |
| Luther South; High School | Chicago, IL | Braves | Blue, Gold | 1953 | 2009 | 1A | 2A |
| Elgin; Academy | Elgin, IL | Hilltoppers | Orange, Black | 1954 | 1966 | - | - |
| Glennwood; School for boys | Glenwood, IL | Wildcats | Blue, Gold | 1954 | 1966 | - | - |
| North Shore; Country Day School | Winnetka, IL | Raiders | Purple, White | 1954 | 1966 | - | - |
| Morgan Park; Academy | Chicago, IL | Warriors | Maroon, Ivory | 1960 | 1966 | - | - |
| Little Flower; Academy | Chicago, IL | Lancers | Black, White | 1971 | 1973 | - | - |
| Providence; High School | New Lenox, IL | Celtics | Kelly Green, White | 1971 | 1995 | A | 3A |
| Aurora Central Catholic; High School | Aurora, IL | Chargers | Blue, Gold | 1973 | 1997 | A | 3A |
| Nazareth; Academy | La Grange Park, IL | Roadrunners | Columbia Blue, White & Navy Blue | 1980 | 2001 | A | 3A |
| Peru St. Bede; High School | Peru, IL | Bruins | Green, White | 1995 | 1998 | A | 2A |
| St. Gregory; High School | Chicago, IL | Greyhounds | Red, White, Royal Blue, Gray | 1995 | 2009 | A | 2A |
| Aurora Christian; High School | Aurora, IL | Eagles | Red, White, Gray | 1998 | 2009 | A | 2A |
| Rockford Christian Life; High School | Rockford, IL | Eagles | Blue, Gray | 2001 | 2009 | A | 2A |
| Rockford Christian; High School | Rockford, IL | Royal Lions | Royal Blue, Metallic Gold, Black | 2001 | 2003 | A | 2A |
| Rockford Lutheran; High School | Rockford, IL | Crusaders | Purple, White | 2001 | 2003 | A | 2A |
| Lake Forest; Academy | Lake Forest, IL | Caxys | Orange, Black | 2003 | 2009 | A | 2A |
| Seton; Academy | South Holland, IL | Sting | Black, White, Gold | 2005 | 2009 | A | 2A |
| Walther Lutheran; High School | Melrose Park, IL | Broncos | Green, White | 1955 | 2009 | A | 2A |

Sources:IHSA Conferences, IHSA Coop Teams, and IHSA Member Schools Directory

=== Membership timeline ===
Full members
