= ESCC =

ESCC may refer to:

- East Suburban Catholic Conference, a schools sports body in Chicago
- East Sussex County Council, England
- Eastern Suburbs Cricket Club, near Sydney
- English Sewing Cotton Company, a successor of Bagley & Wright
- Esophageal squamous cell carcinoma, a cause of esophageal cancer
