= Rosary High School =

Rosary High School may refer to:

- Rosary High School (Fullerton, California), renamed 2015 as Rosary Academy
- Rosary High School (Aurora, Illinois)
