= Guerin High School =

Guerin High School may refer to:

- Guerin College Preparatory High School
- St. Theodore Guerin High School
