= Western Sun Conference =

Defunct high school athletics conference in Illinois, USA

The Western Sun Conference (WSC) was an organization of eight high schools in northern Illinois, representing eight communities in that part of the state. These high schools are all members of the Illinois High School Association. The conference began competing during the 2006-2007 academic year. Six of the schools came from the former Suburban Prairie Conference North division. The Western Sun Conference disbanded after the 2009-2010 academic year.

== Members ==
- Batavia High School, Batavia, Illinois - Bulldogs ^
- DeKalb High School, DeKalb, Illinois - Barbs %
- Geneva High School, Geneva, Illinois - Vikings ^
- Glenbard South High School, Glen Ellyn, Illinois - Raiders &
- Kaneland High School, Maple Park, Illinois - Knights %
- Rochelle Township High School, Rochelle, Illinois - Hubs %
- Sycamore High School, Sycamore, Illinois - Spartans %
- Yorkville High School, Yorkville, Illinois - Foxes %

^ = Departed to join the Upstate Eight Conference for the 2010-2011 academic year
% = Departed to join the Northern Illinois Big 12 Conference for the 2010-2011 academic year
& = Became an Independent School for the 2010-2011 academic year; ultimately joined the Metro Suburban Conference
