= Driscoll Catholic High School =

Private school in Addison, Illinois, US

Location
- 555 North Lombard Road; Addison, Illinois 60101; United States; 41.9377°N 88.0205°W

Information
- School type: Private, Coeducational
- Religious affiliation: Roman Catholic
- Opened: 1966
- Status: Closed
- Closed: 2009
- Authority: Christian Brothers
- Oversight: Diocese of Joliet
- Grades: 9–12
- Campus: suburban
- Colors: black old gold
- Nickname: Highlanders
- Newspaper: DC Pride
- Yearbook: Claymore
- Website: driscollcatholic.org

Driscoll Catholic High School was a private college preparatory high school in the village of Addison, Illinois. It had been accredited by the State of Illinois and the North Central Association of Colleges and Schools.

Founded in 1966, Driscoll brought Catholic secondary education to Addison, Illinois. The Driscoll Catholic football team won eight state championships, including seven in a row (2001–07) which stands as a high school record in the State of Illinois.

Driscoll was a member of the Lasallian Schools Association and the Roman Catholic Diocese of Joliet in Illinois. Athletically, Driscoll competed in the Suburban Catholic Conference. Driscoll's football team won seven consecutive state championships from 2001 to 2007 (six being 4A and one as 3A) to establish a state record.

== Athletics ==
Driscoll competed in the Suburban Catholic Conference, and as a member of the Illinois High School Association (IHSA), which sponsored State Championship tournaments in many sports (generally in the smaller or middle classes of competition). Driscoll Catholic had one of the best high school football programs in the state of Illinois.

The school sponsored interscholastic teams for men and women in basketball, cross country, golf, soccer, and track and field. Men would usually compete in baseball, bowling, football, ice hockey, and wrestling. Women would usually compete in cheerleading, dance, softball, and volleyball.

Driscoll has placed in the top four of the following IHSA State Championship Tournaments:

- Baseball: 3rd place (1990–91, 2005–06); 2nd place (1999–2000); State Champions (1991–92, 1993–94, 1996–97)
- Basketball (girls): State Champions (2008–09)
- Football: State Champions (1991–92, 2001–02, 2002–03, 2003–04, 2004–05, 2005–06, 2006–07, 2007-08)

Notably, in football, Driscoll's 8 state titles was the fourth most in Illinois high school history. The string of seven consecutive state titles was by far the Illinois high school record, with no other team winning more than five in a row.

== Closing ==
It was announced on April 2, 2009, that Driscoll Catholic would close its doors at the end of the 2009 school year due to low enrollment and a lack of funds.

Driscoll students, alumni, faculty, staff, and friends worked to raise funds and keep the school open. On April 19, 2009, the Chicago Tribune reported that even if fund raising efforts are successful, there was a concern that the school could fall short of the minimum enrollment needed to keep the school open.

On April 28, 2009, the Chicago Tribune reported that the De La Salle Christian Brothers of the Midwest had sent an e-mail to students and families announcing that even if enough money were to be raised to keep the school open, it would be closing at the end of the year.
