= Notre Dame College Prep =

Private all-male school in Niles, Illinois, United States

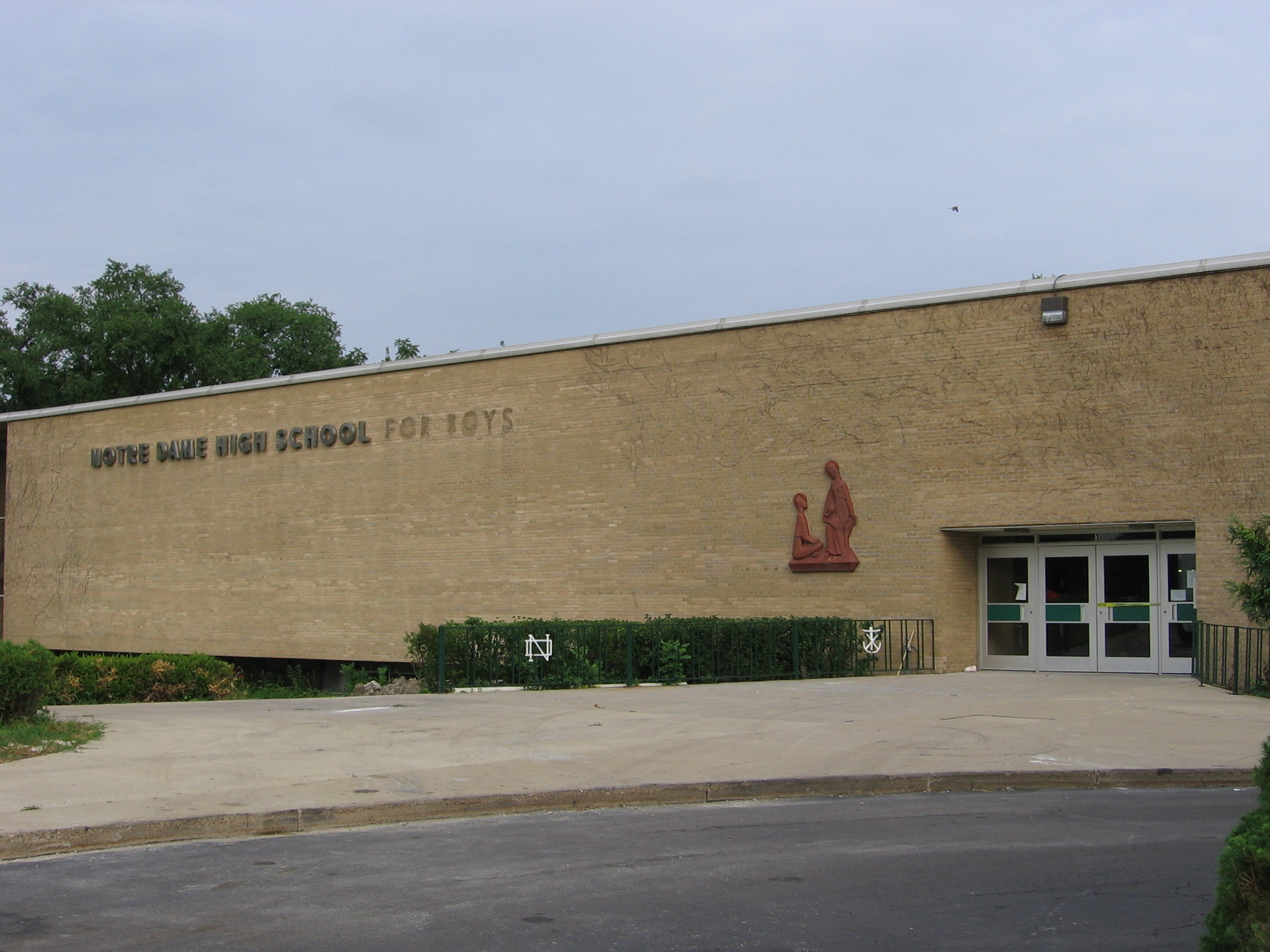

Location
- 7655 West Dempster Street; Niles, Illinois 60714; United States; 42.0386°N 87.8178°W

Information
- Type: Private, All-Male
- Denomination: Roman Catholic
- Established: 1955
- Founder: Congregation of Holy Cross
- Grades: 9–12
- Campus size: 28 acres (110,000 m^{2})
- Colors: Green, White, and Blue
- Fight song: March of the Dons
- Athletics conference: Chicago Catholic League
- Mascot: Harvey the Bull
- Team name: Dons
- Rival: St. Patrick High School
- Accreditation: North Central Association of Colleges and Schools
- Yearbook: Maridon
- Tuition: $16,650
- Website: www.nddons.org

Notre Dame College Preparatory is a male-only Roman Catholic secondary school founded in Niles, Illinois, in 1955 by the Congregation of Holy Cross. It is located in the Roman Catholic Archdiocese of Chicago.The school was built by Belli & Belli of Chicago.

Prior to 2008, Notre Dame College Prep was known as Notre Dame High School for Boys.

== History ==
Notre Dame College Prep was one of the first Catholic high schools to open in the suburban Chicago area. It was opened at the request of the then Cardinal Archbishop of Chicago, Samuel Stritch, with the supervision of the Priests of the Congregation of Holy Cross.

The timing of the new school corresponded to the closing of the Congregation's school (Columbia Prep School) in Portland, Oregon. About half of the faculty came east from Portland to start the new school in Illinois. They also brought with them the old school's athletic uniforms, which necessitated the new school's colors to be the same as the Oregon school's (green and white).

The original name of Notre Dame High School for Boys drew a connection between the Congregation's most noted local center of higher learning, the University of Notre Dame, and the Chicago area, which had given its support to the University and the congregation over many years.

In the summer of 2006, the Congregation announced that it would be ending its formal association with the school, effective at the end of the 2006–07 school year. From 2006 to 2015, a board of both religious and lay people ran the school and maintained a relationship with the Archdiocese. In 2015, the Brothers of Holy Cross began sponsorship of the school.

== Academics ==
The school offers four programs designed for students of differing levels of skill which focus on college preparation - Hesburgh Scholar Program, College Prep Program, St. Andre Bessette, and the Burke Scholar Program. The Burke Scholar Program is for students with developmental and learning disabilities who are below grade level but can function in a classroom without 1:1 support. Students in the program have a choice of attaining a high school diploma or a certificate of completion, the latter of which will enable the student to continue receiving special education services until reaching the age of 22.

== Athletics ==
Notre Dame College Prep sponsors teams in 15 sports that are governed by the Illinois High School Association: baseball, basketball, bowling, cross country, football, golf, soccer, swimming & diving, tennis, track and field, volleyball, and wrestling. Historically, all of these teams (except for bowling and swimming) compete in the East Suburban Catholic Conference, however with recent consolidation within Catholic athletic competition, Notre Dame College Prep has moved to the CCL

The school also sponsors teams in ice hockey and lacrosse. Lacrosse competes in the Chicago Metro Conference, and plays in a state tournament governed by the Illinois High School Lacrosse Association. The hockey team plays in the Chicago Suburban Catholic League.

In addition, Notre Dame College Prep offers boxing, but does not compete other schools in that sport.

The following teams placed in the top seven at IHSA sponsored state tournaments:

- Baseball •• State Champions (2003—04)
- Football •• 2nd place (1989—90)
- Ping Pong •• State Semi-Finals (2018–19)
- Cross Country •• State Team Qualifier (2012 season)
- Bass Fishing •• 3rd place (2012–13)
- Cross Country •• State Individual Qualifier (2017 season)
- Cross Country •• State Team Qualifier (2018, 2022 seasons)

The hockey team won three state tournaments in 1976, 1992, and 2010 in the AHAI State Tournament, the governing body of hockey in Illinois.

Notre Dame College Prep has fielded one of the top-ranked basketball teams in Illinois and several graduates have gone on to successful college basketball and professional careers, including Jim Les and Matt Mooney, who each played in the NBA.

Notre Dame College Prep's football team won the 2021 Chicago Prep Bowl.

== Notable alumni ==
- Ted Ansani, bass player of 1990s pop band Material Issue
- Matthew Bogusz is the former Mayor of Des Plaines, elected 2013 as youngest mayor in Illinois
- Jim Les (class of 1981), former NBA guard, currently men's basketball head coach at UC Davis, formerly head coach at Bradley
- Greg Luzinski (class of 1968), former Major League Baseball player, 4-time All-Star, member of 1980 World Series champion Philadelphia Phillies
- Michael McCaskey, chairman of NFL's Chicago Bears 1999-2011
- Jim McNeely (class of 1967) is a Grammy Award-winning jazz composer, arranger and pianist, currently with Vanguard Jazz Orchestra
- James Pankow (class of 1965) is a trombonist, composer and member of band Chicago, inducted into Rock and Roll Hall of Fame
- Danny Pudi (class of 1997), actor on NBC series Community
- Tim Rudnick (class of 1970), former NFL player for the Baltimore Colts
- Joseph Sikora (class of 1994), actor, known for role as Tommy Egan on the Starz series Power
- Matt Mooney (class of 2013), current basketball player for the Reeder Samsunspor
- Martin Krug (class of 2021), current professional soccer player
