= Montini Catholic High School =

Catholic high school in Illinois, United States

Location
- 19W070 16th Street; Lombard, Illinois 60148; United States; 41°51′13″N 88°0′3″W

Information
- Type: Private, parochial
- Motto: Signum Fidei (The Sign of Faith)
- Denomination: Roman Catholic
- Patron saint: St. John Baptist De La Salle
- Established: 1966; 60 years ago
- Authority: Diocese of Joliet
- Oversight: Christian Brothers of the Midwest
- CEEB code: 142663
- President: Kevin Beirne
- Principal: Chris Tiritilli
- Faculty: 86
- Grades: 9–12
- Gender: Co-educational
- Age range: 13-18
- Enrollment: 585 (2018)
- Average class size: 20
- Student to teacher ratio: 20:1
- Campus type: Suburban
- Colors: Maroon, gold and white
- Athletics conference: Chicago Catholic League, GCAC
- Team name: Broncos
- Accreditation: North Central Association of Colleges and Schools
- Publication: Musings (literary magazine)
- Yearbook: Echoes
- School fees: $475, Fr/Soph $575 Jr/Sr
- Tuition: $11,820
- Website: www.montini.org

Montini Catholic High School (often shortened to Montini) is a co-educational, college preparatory, high school, run by the Christian Brothers in Lombard, Illinois. It is located in the Roman Catholic Diocese of Joliet in Illinois. The school was planned by the Christian Brothers in 1963. Pope Paul VI, whose name was Giovanni Battista Montini (John Baptist Montini), was elected to the Papacy that same year. In his honor, the Christian Brothers named the school Montini Catholic High School. Construction of the buildings took place in 1965 and 1966. In September 1966, Montini Catholic High school opened its doors to 217 freshmen. The first commencement exercises were held on June 1, 1970.

== Renovations ==
The campus renovation initiative, begun in the fall of 2002, is called the Capital Campaign.

Phase I of the Capital Campaign, construction of the West Wing, was completed in 2003. The West Wing contains the 300 Corridor, which added 8 new classrooms to the school and the Field House.

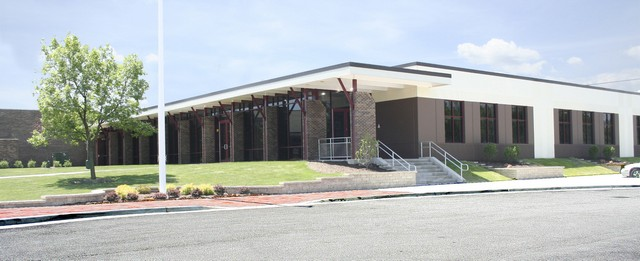
New Academic and Administrative Center

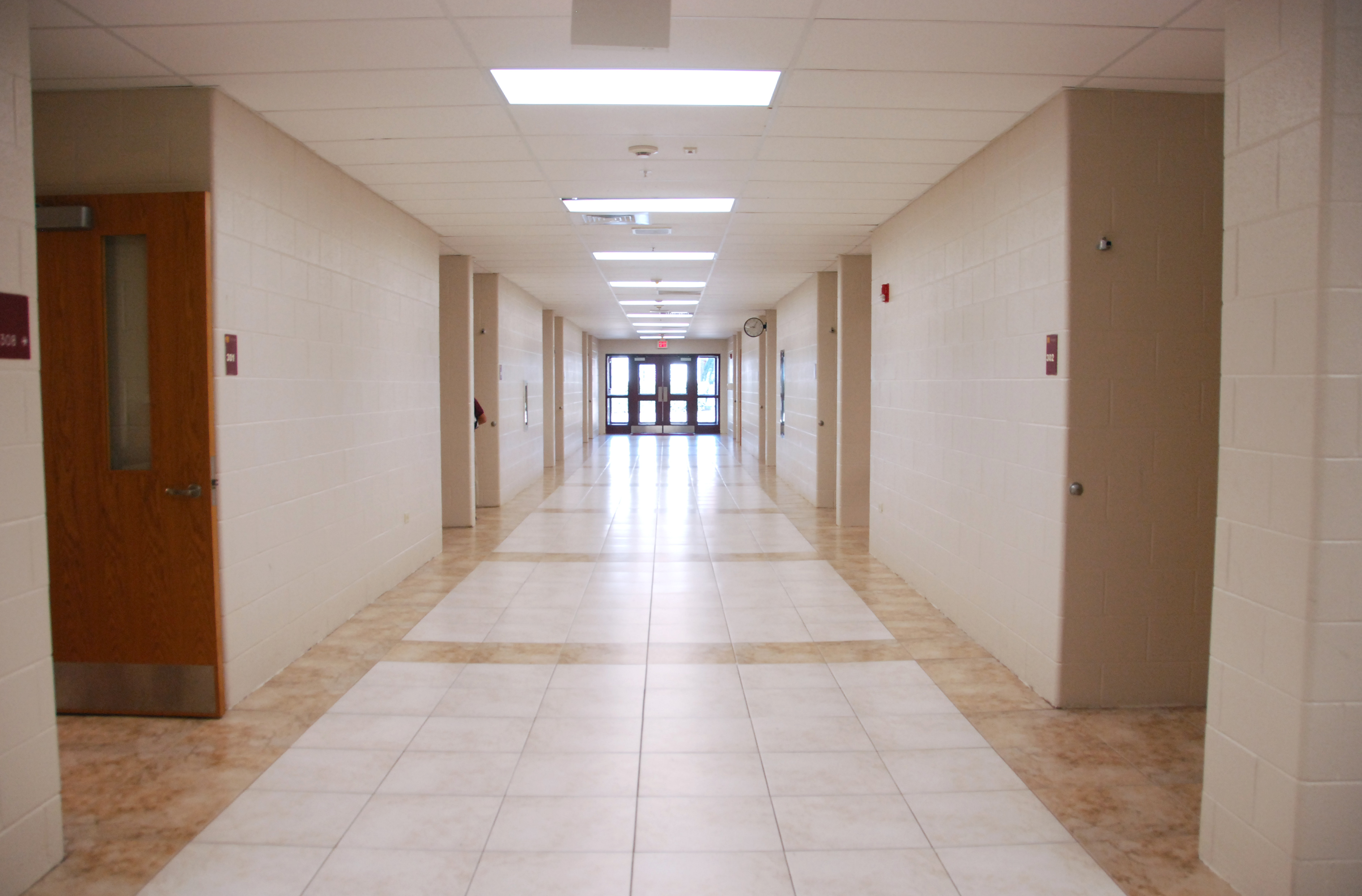
Inside 300 Corridor, West Wing

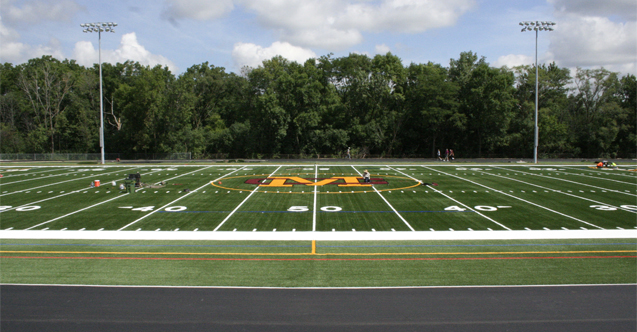
Completed Duffy Memorial Stadium Field Turf

Phase II of the Capital Campaign, demolition of Dominic Hall and construction of an Academic and Administrative Center, was completed in 2009.

Phase III of the Capital Campaign was begun in the summer of 2010 and was slated for completion by 2016.

== Academics ==
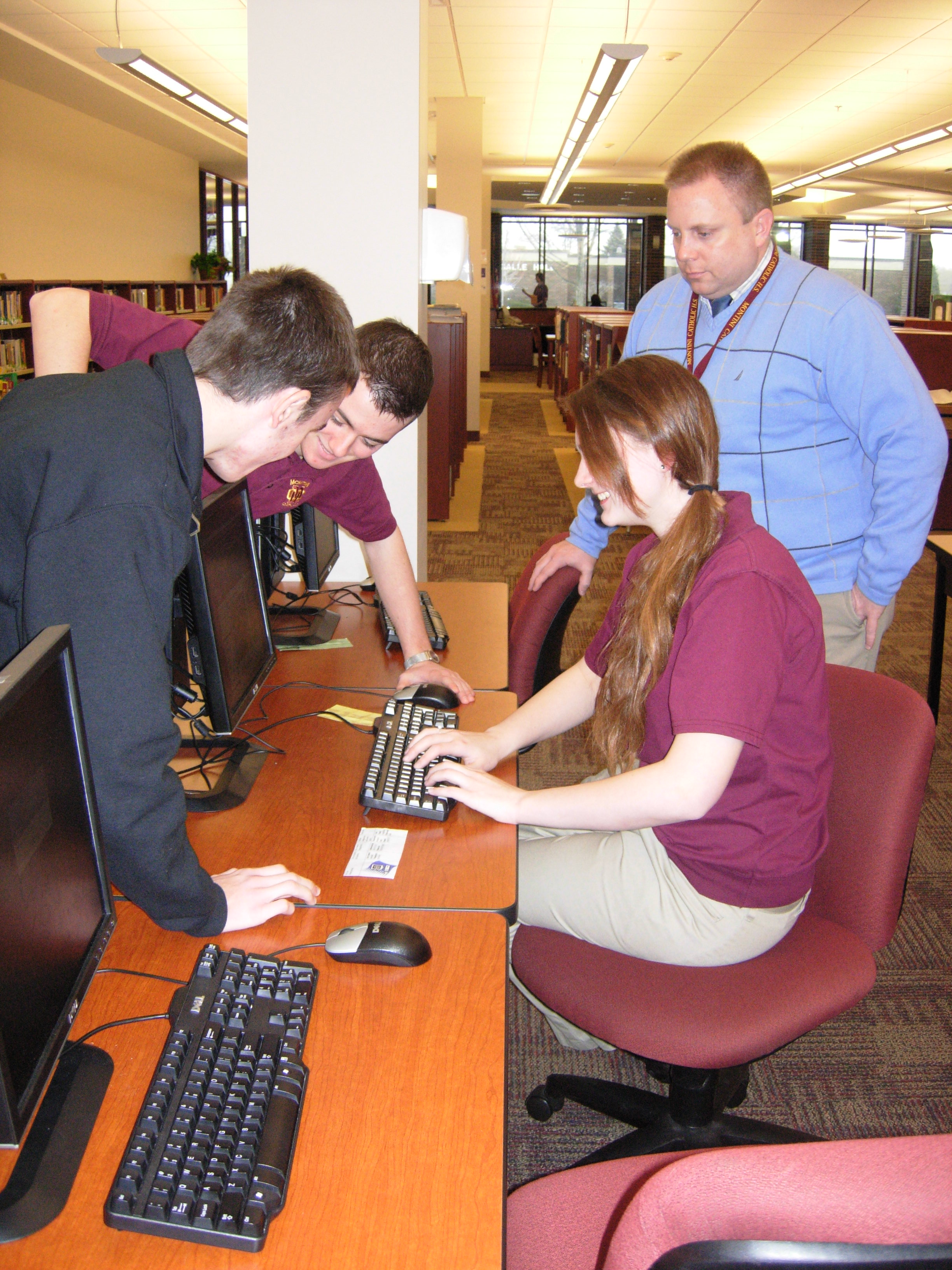
Students and teacher using computer in the New Learning Resource Center

The school year is divided into two 18-week semesters. Mid-semester grades are issued at nine weeks. The school day consists of eight class periods of 48 minutes each.

== Athletics ==
Montini is a member of two conferences for boys Chicago Catholic League for girls they are in GCAC and both boys and girls participate in the Illinois High School Association. Teams are stylized as the Broncos and Lady Broncos respectively.

The school offers a number of fall, winter, spring and year-round sports for both girls and boys. Sports offerings include:

| Girls Sports | Boys Sports |
|---|---|
| Basketball | Baseball |
| Broncettes (Dance) | Basketball |
| Cheerleading | Cross Country |
| Cross Country | Football |
| Golf | Golf |
| | Hockey |
| Lacrosse | Lacrosse |
| Soccer | Soccer |
| Softball | |
| Tennis | |
| Track & Field | Track & Field |
| Volleyball | Volleyball |
| Wrestling | Wrestling |

=== Athletic accomplishments ===
The Broncos football team began its current streak of state playoff appearances in 1993, making it to the semifinals that year. The first football state championship was won during the 2004 season, with a 44–7 victory over Coal City in the Class 4a title game. High finishes and state titles within the IHSA listed below:

==== Boys Baseball ====
| Year | Finish | Class |
|---|---|---|
| 2000–2001 | 3rd | A |
| 2004–2005 | 2nd | A |
| 2018–2019 | 1st | 3A |

==== Boys Football ====
| Year | Finish | Class |
|---|---|---|
| 2004–2005 | 1st | 4A |
| 2009–2010 | 1st | 5A |
| 2010–2011 | 1st | 5A |
| 2011–2012 | 1st | 5A |
| 2012–2013 | 1st | 5A |
| 2013–2014 | 2nd | 5A |
| 2014–2015 | 2nd | 5A |
| 2015–2016 | 1st | 6A |
| 2018–2019 | 2nd | 5A |
| 2024–2025 | 1st | 3A |
| 2025-2026 | 1st | 4A |

==== Boys Track and Field ====
| Year | Finish | Class |
|---|---|---|
| 2004–2005 | 2nd | A |

==== Boys Wrestling ====
| Year | Finish | Class |
|---|---|---|
| 1995–1996 | 3rd | A |
| 1997–1998 | 3rd | A |
| 1999–2000 | 1st | A |
| 2001–2002 | 1st | A |
| 2002–2003 | 1st | A |
| 2003–2004 | 1st | A |
| 2004–2005 | 1st | A |
| 2006–2007 | 2nd | AA |
| 2007–2008 | 1st | AA |
| 2008–2009 | 1st | 2A |
| 2009–2010 | 1st | 2A |
| 2010–2011 | 1st | 2A |
| 2011–2012 | 1st | 2A |
| 2012–2013 | 1st | 2A |
| 2013–2014 | 1st | 2A |
| 2014–2015 | 1st | 2A |
| 2016–2017 | 2nd | 3A |
| 2017–2018 | 1st | 3A |
| 2018–2019 | 1st | 3A |
| 2019–2020 | 1st | 3A |
| 2023-2024 | 2nd | 2A |
| 2024-2025 | 3rd | 2A |
| 2025-2026 | 2nd | 3A |

==== Girls Basketball ====
| Year | Finish | Class |
|---|---|---|
| 2007–2008 | 3rd | 3A |
| 2009–2010 | 1st | 3A |
| 2010–2011 | 1st | 3A |
| 2011–2012 | 1st | 3A |
| 2012–2013 | 3rd | 3A |
| 2013–2014 | 1st | 3A |
| 2014–2015 | 3rd | 3A |
| 2016–2017 | 3rd | 4A |
| 2017–2018 | 2nd | 4A |
| 2023-2024 | 3rd | 3A |
| 2024-2025 | 1st | 3A |

Girls Softball

| Year | Finish | Class |
|---|---|---|
| 2015–2016 | 1st | 3A |
| 2017–2018 | 1st | 3A |

Girls Soccer

| Year | Finish | Class |
|---|---|---|
| 2021–2022 | 3rd | 1A |

==== Girls Cross Country ====
| Year | Finish | Class |
|---|---|---|
| 2011–2012 | 3rd | 2A |
| 2012–2013 | 3rd | 2A |

==== Girls Volleyball ====
| Year | Finish | Class |
|---|---|---|
| 2014–2015 | 4th | 3A |
| 2021–2022 | 1st | 2A |

The school's dance team, The Broncettes, have won two consecutive state Pom titles and over 15 state titles in the IDTA dating back to 1994.

== Notable alumni ==
- Tony Fitzpatrick (1977), artist
- Kathleen Hermesdorf (1985), dancer and choreographer
- Scott Sobkowiak (1995), MLB pitcher
- Mac Brandt (1998), actor
- Chase Beebe (2003), former bantamweight Champion for World Extreme Cage Fighting
- Jaleel Johnson (2012), NFL defensive end
- Jordan Westerkamp (2012), former college football wide receiver
- Joseph Spivak (2017), WWE superstar
- RayJ Dennis (2019 - transferred), basketball player for the Indiana Pacers
- Jermari Harris (2019), cornerback for the Tennessee Titans
