= Chicago Catholic League =

US high school athletic conference

- Conference: Illinois High School Association
- Founded: 1912
- No. of teams: 26 + 1 Affiliate
- Region: Chicago, Illinois

The Chicago Catholic League (CCL) is a high school athletic conference based in Chicago, Illinois, United States. All of the schools are part of the Illinois High School Association, the governing body for Illinois scholastic sports. While some of the schools are coeducational institutions, the conference only supports athletics for male teams. (The Girls Catholic Athletic Conference serves as its female counterpart.)

The CCL is perhaps best known for its success in football, water polo, wrestling, and baseball. Since the Illinois High School Association began a state football tournament in 1974, the CCL has placed first or second more than any conference or league in the state. Since 2002 when the IHSA first sponsored a state tournament in water polo, the CCL has not failed to win the state title for boys, until Lyons in 2012. Since 1984, when the IHSA moved to a dual-team state series in wrestling (previously, the team champion was based on the advancement of individuals in the individual state tournament), the CCL has also finished first or second more than any conference or league.

The conference's alumni include Heisman Trophy-winning quarterback Johnny Lattner, Cy Young Award-winning pitcher Denny McLain, Basketball Hall of Fame member Moose Krause, Duke University men's basketball coach Mike Krzyzewski, former NBA player Corey Maggette, All-Pro quarterback Donovan McNabb, and NBA All-Star Antoine Walker.

== Member schools ==
School	Town	Team name	Colors	IHSA Classes 2/3/4	Reference
Aurora Central Catholic High School (Boys)	Aurora	Chargers		A/1A/2A	
Benet Academy	Lisle	Redwings		AA/3A/4A	
Brother Rice High School	Chicago	Crusaders		AA/3A/4A	
Carmel Catholic High School	Mundelein	Corsairs		AA/3A/4A	
De La Salle Institute	Chicago	Meteors		A/2A/2A	
DePaul College Prep	Chicago	Rams		AA/2A/3A	
Fenwick High School	Oak Park	Friars		AA/3A/4A	
Joliet Catholic Academy	Joliet	Hilltoppers/Angels^{1}		AA/2A/3A	
IC Catholic Prep	Elmhurst	Knights		A/2A/2A	
Leo Catholic High School	Chicago	Lions		A/1A/2A	
Loyola Academy	Wilmette	Ramblers		AA/3A/4A	
Marmion Academy	Aurora	Cadets		A/1A/2A	
Marian Catholic High School	Chicago Heights	Spartans		AA/2A/3A	
Marist High School	Chicago	RedHawks		AA/3A/4A	
Montini Catholic High School	Lombard	Broncos		A/3A/4A	
Mt. Carmel High School	Chicago	Caravan		AA/3A/4A	
Nazareth Academy	La Grange Park	Roadrunners		AA/2A/3A	
Notre Dame College Prep	Niles	Dons		AA/3A/4A	
Providence Catholic High School	New Lenox	Celtics		AA/3A/4A	
Providence St. Mel School^{2}	Chicago	Knights		A/2A/3A	
St. Francis High School	Wheaton	Spartans		A/2A/3A	
St. Francis de Sales High School	Chicago	Pioneers		A/1A/2A	
St. Ignatius College Prep	Chicago	Wolfpack		AA/3A/4A	
St. Laurence High School	Burbank	Vikings		AA/3A/4A	
St. Patrick High School	Chicago	Shamrocks		AA/3A/4A	
St. Rita of Cascia High School	Chicago	Mustangs		AA/3A/4A	
St. Viator High School	Arlington Heights	Lions		AA/2A/3A	

St. Joseph High School joined the conference in 2011, however the school has since closed in 2021. Lake Forest Academy joined the conference for football only in 2011. St.Viator High School joined in 2010 to compete in the conference for lacrosse. Additionally, St. Patrick High School, Notre Dame High School, and Marist High School participate in the conference for Boys Bowling.

For those schools which are coed, most of the girls teams compete in the Girls Catholic Athletic Conference. The girls teams from Bishop McNamara, Fenwick, and Providence compete in the East Suburban Catholic Conference.

Holy Trinity (Tigers) (1443 W. Division St) was also a Catholic League team. Last Catholic League season for football was 1965.

== History ==
The Chicago Catholic League was formed in 1912 as a way to give the all-male Catholic schools of the area interscholastic competition. The move to form the league was precipitated when the dominant high school league in the metropolitan area, the Cook County High School League, delayed the application of St. Ignatius Academy and DePaul Academy. Representatives of eight schools met at the Great Northern Hotel—De Paul Academy, St Ignatius Academy, St Rita College, St. Cyril College (which would become Mount Carmel High School), Cathedral High, St. Philip High, Loyola Academy, and De La Salle Institute — but could not get together on the particulars to form a football–only league.

In the third week of November, the schools managed to form a league and drew up a schedule of games in basketball and indoor baseball. The founding members of the league were St. Stanislaus, De la Salle, De Paul, St. Ignatius, St. Cyril, St. Philip, Loyola, and Cathedral. By the spring when a baseball schedule was drawn up, Holy Trinity had joined the league, but Cathedral dropped out, leaving an eight-team circuit. In the fall of 1913, the league introduced football. By the following year, league champion De Paul, felt feisty enough to invite St. John's Preparatory from Danvers, Massachusetts, to Chicago to engage in an intersectional contest. De Paul narrowly lost the game, but it demonstrated to the league that its program was thriving. Two years later De Paul traveled to Boston and met Beverly High in Fenway Park, destroying the team 30–7. More schools joined the circuit before the decade was up, St. Patrick in 1913, and St. Mel in 1918.

Because the Catholic school population relative to the mainstream public secondary schools and the private school was more an immigrant and working class population, the sports that the league initially sponsored reflected this demographic makeup. For example, during the first four years of the league's existence, only baseball, basketball, indoor baseball, and football were offered. Basketball was the most robust sport, as the league not only provided for heavyweight and lightweight schedules, but also bantamweight (added in 1919) and flyweight competition (added in the early 1920s). The Chicago Public High School League and Suburban League offered basketball only in the heavyweight and lightweight classes, after experimenting only a few years with a bantamweight class.

The Catholic League added track and field in 1917, but it was not until 1924 that three "country club" sports were added to the league's schedule golf, tennis, and swimming. The addition of these sports brought the league up to the level of offerings by the Chicago and Suburban public leagues. The 1920s also saw the addition of more schools to the league—St. George, Joliet De la Salle, and Fenwick.

Some working class sports that had great appeal in some Catholic schools were boxing and bowling, and the league sponsored competition for a few years during the Depression in boxing, and much longer in bowling.

By the late 1950s some of the Catholic League members were growing restive, wanting to participate in the state tournaments sponsored by the Illinois High School Association (IHSA). The four Christian Brothers schools – De La Salle, St. George, St. Mel and St. Patrick – withdrew from the Catholic League and joined the IHSA upon its formation of the Chicagoland Prep League (CPL) on 27 February 1961. St. Ignatius would defect to the CPL two years later on 9 April 1963.

The Catholic League finally joined the IHSA in 1974, and eventually saw the return of St. Ignatius, St. Patrick, and De La Salle into the league. Because of their membership in the IHSA, the 29-year-old tradition of a Catholic League All-Star basketball game ended in 1974. In the beginning of 1996 the CCL and the East Suburban Catholic Conference and other Catholic high schools decided to make a super catholic conference. They called it the Chicago Metropolitan Conference. Every school from the East Suburban was in the conference except Nazareth Academy and Marian Central Catholic. This conference ended in the 2002–2003 season and both conferences went back to normal. Swimming and water polo founded the Metro Catholic Aquatic Conference in 1999 which included the all East Suburban Catholic and CCL teams and still hosts a conference championship for both sports. The MCAC won every state title in water polo from 1974 to 2011.

== Past members ==
- (Defunct) Archbishop Weber High School Red Horde
- (Defunct) St. Martin de Porres Academy Silver Eagles
- (Defunct) St. George Dragons
- (Defunct) Mendel Catholic Monarchs
- (Defunct) St. Elizabeth Ironmen
- (Defunct) DePaul Academy Blue Demons
- (Defunct) St. Mel Knights
- (Defunct) St. Philip Gaels
- (Defunct) St. Joseph Chargers
- (Defunct) Hales Franciscan High School
- (Defunct) Guerin College Preparatory High School Gators
- Gordon Tech (now known as DePaul College Prep)
- Bishop McNamara Catholic High School
- Holy Trinity High School

== State championships ==
=== Baseball ===
State champions

- 1975–76 • Brother Rice (Class AA)
- 1977–78 • Providence Catholic (Class A)
- 1981–82 • Providence Catholic (Class A)
- 2012–13 • Mount Carmel (Class 4A)
- 2013–14 • Providence Catholic (Class 4A)
- 2014–15 • Providence Catholic (Class 4A)
- 2015–16 • Providence Catholic (Class 4A)
- 2018–19 • Montini Catholic (Class 3A)
- 2023-24 . Providence Catholic (Class 4A)
- 2024–25 • St. Laurence (Class 3A)

=== Basketball ===
Prior to the 2007–2008 season, the state basketball title was contested in two classes. Since then, it is contested in four classes.

State champions

- 1978–79 • Providence Catholic (Class A)
- 1984–85 • Providence St. Mel (Class A)
- 1984–85 • Mount Carmel (Class AA)
- 2002–03 • Hales Franciscan (Class A)
- 2003–04 • Leo (Class A)
- 2008–09 • Seton Academy (Class AA)
- 2010–11 • Hales Franciscan (Class 2A)
- 2022-23 . Depaul Prep (Class 2A)
- 2023-24 . Depaul Prep (Class 3A)
- 2024-25 . Depaul Prep (Class 3A)

The 2004–05 Class A title was stripped from Hales Franciscan after it was determined that the school had not been approved by the Illinois State Board of Education between 2003 and 2005.

=== Football ===
From 1974–79, IHSA had 5 classes based on enrollment for football (1A-5A). In 1980, IHSA expanded to 6 classes. 2001 saw the latest change, which added 2 more classes, which is what is played to date.

In 2019–20, CCL merged with the ESCC for football only. The CCL/ESCC is divided into six divisions.

Blue	Green	Orange	White	Purple	Red
Brother Rice	Montini	Carmel	DePaul	Benet	De La Salle
Loyola	Nazareth	Fenwick	IC Catholic	Marmion	Marian
Marist	St. Francis	Providence	Joliet	Notre Dame	Leo
Mt. Carmel	St. Rita	St. Ignatius	St. Laurence	St. Patrick	St. Viator

State champions

- 1976–77 • St. Laurence (Class 5A)
- 1978–79 • St. Rita (Class 5A)
- 1980–81 • Gordon Tech (Class 6A)
- 1980–81 • Mt. Carmel (Class 5A)
- 1981–82 • Brother Rice (Class 6A)
- 1982–83 • Bishop McNamara (Class 3A)
- 1985–86 • Bishop McNamara (Class 3A)
- 1986–87 • Bishop McNamara (Class 3A)
- 1987–88 • Providence Catholic (Class 4A)
- 1987–88 • Bishop McNamara (Class 3A)
- 1988–89 • Mt. Carmel (Class 6A)
- 1989–90 • Mt. Carmel (Class 5A)
- 1990–91 • Mt. Carmel (Class 5A)
- 1991–92 • Mt. Carmel (Class 5A)
- 1991–92 • Providence Catholic (Class 4A)
- 1993–94 • Loyola Academy (Class 6A)
- 1994–95 • Providence Catholic (Class 5A)
- 1995–96 • Providence Catholic (Class 4A)
- 1996–97 • Mt. Carmel (Class 5A)
- 1996–97 • Providence Catholic (Class 4A)
- 1997–98 • Providence Catholic (Class 4A)
- 1998–99 • Mt. Carmel (Class 5A)
- 1999–2000 • Mt. Carmel (Class 5A)
- 2000–01 • Mt. Carmel (Class 5A)
- 2001–02 • Providence Catholic (Class 6A)
- 2002–03 • Mt. Carmel (Class 6A)
- 2002–03 • Providence Catholic (Class 5A)
- 2004–05 • Providence Catholic (Class 6A)
- 2006–07 • St. Rita (Class 7A)
- 2012–13 • Mt. Carmel (Class 8A)
- 2013–14 • Mt. Carmel (Class 7A)
- 2014–15 • Providence Catholic (Class 7A)
- 2015–16 • Montini Catholic (Class 6A)
- 2015–16 • Loyola Academy (Class 8A)
- 2018–19 • Loyola Academy (Class 8A)
- 2019–20 • Mt. Carmel (Class 7A)
- 2021–22 • Fenwick (Class 5A)
- 2022–23 • Mt. Carmel (Class 7A)
- 2022–23 • Loyola Academy (Class 8A)
- 2023–24 • Mt. Carmel (Class 7A)
- 2023–24 • Loyola Academy (Class 8A)
- 2024–25 • Montini Catholic (Class 3A)
- 2024–25 • DePaul Prep (Class 4A)
- 2024–25 • Mt. Carmel (Class 7A)
- 2024–25 • Loyola Academy (Class 8A)
- 2025–26 • Montini Catholic (Class 4A)
- 2025–26 • St. Francis (Class 5A)
- 2025–26 • Fenwick (Class 6A)
- 2025–26 • Brother Rice (Class 7A)
- 2025–26 • Mt. Carmel (Class 8A)

=== Golf ===
State champions

- 1986–87 • Loyola Academy (Class AA)
- 1992–93 • Bishop McNamara (Class A)
- 1996–97 • Loyola Academy (Class AA)
- 2000–01 • Loyola Academy (Class AA)
- 2000–01 • Bishop McNamara (Class A)
- 2001–02 • Loyola Academy (Class AA)

=== Swimming and Diving ===
State champions

- 1989–90 • Fenwick
- 1990–91 • Fenwick
- 1991–92 • Fenwick

=== Track and Field ===
State Champions

- 1980–81 • Leo (Class A)
- 1994–95 • Leo (Class AA)
- 1997–98 • Leo (Class A Co-Champions)
- 2001–02 • Leo (Class A)
- 2002–03 • Leo (Class A)
- 2011–12 • Leo (Class A)
- 2017–18 • Marmion (Class AA)

=== Water Polo ===
The IHSA began a state series in water polo with the 2001–02 school year. Prior to that, a high school state championship was sponsored by Illinois Water Polo. There was no Championship Game in 1979 as Water Polo switched from a Fall to a Spring sport.
State Champions
ISA State Champions

- 1974 • Fenwick
- 1975 • Mount Carmel
- 1976 • Fenwick
- 1977 • Fenwick
- 1978 • Loyola
- 1980 • Brother Rice
- 1981 • Brother Rice
- 1982 • Brother Rice
- 1983 • Brother Rice
- 1984 • Brother Rice
- 1985 • Brother Rice
- 1986 • Brother Rice
- 1987 • St. Laurence
- 1988 • Brother Rice
- 1989 • Brother Rice
- 1990 • Fenwick
- 1991 • Fenwick
- 1992 • Fenwick
- 1993 • Fenwick
- 1994 • Brother Rice
- 1995 • Brother Rice
- 1996 • Brother Rice
- 1997 • St. Patrick
- 1998 • Brother Rice
- 1999 • Fenwick
- 2000 • Fenwick
- 2001 • Fenwick

IHSA State Champions

- 2002 • Fenwick
- 2003 • Brother Rice
- 2004 • Fenwick
- 2005 • Fenwick
- 2006 • Fenwick
- 2007 • Fenwick
- 2008 • Fenwick
- 2009 • Fenwick
- 2010 • Fenwick
- 2011 • Fenwick
- 2013 • Fenwick
- 2014 • Loyola

=== Wrestling ===
State Champions

- 1977–78 • Providence Catholic (Class A)
- 1980–81 • Providence Catholic (Class A)
- 1987–88 • Providence Catholic (Class AA)
- 1988–89 • Providence Catholic (Class AA)
- 1989–90 • St. Laurence (Class AA)
- 1991–92 • Mount Carmel (Class AA)
- 1992–93 • Mount Carmel (Class AA)
- 1993–94 • Mount Carmel (Class AA)
- 1996–97 • Providence Catholic (Class AA)
- 1997–98 • Providence Catholic (Class AA)
- 1998–99 • Providence Catholic (Class AA)
- 1999–2000 • Providence Catholic (Class AA)
- 2000–01 • Providence Catholic (Class AA)
- 2001–02 • Providence Catholic (Class AA)
- 2002–03 • St. Rita (Class AA)
- 2003–04 • St. Rita (Class AA)
- 2017–18 • Montini Catholic (Class 3A)
- 2018–19 • Montini Catholic (Class 3A)

== Prep bowl ==
The Prep Bowl is an annual contest played between the Chicago Catholic League and the Chicago Public League and was long for most of its history played at Chicago's Soldier Field. It was first played in 1927, though after a forfeit in 1928, was not played again until 1933, and was the premier high school football event in Illinois until the IHSA formed the state championship football playoffs in 1974. The 1927 game between Mt. Carmel and Carl Schurz High School drew an estimated 50,000 fans; the largest crowd to see a prep football contest in American history, up to that time. In subsequent years, larger crowds were drawn to the annual game.

With the advent of the IHSA state series, the Prep Bowl was contested by the winner of a special playoff in each league played by teams not qualifying for the state playoffs, and teams that were eliminated in early rounds of the state playoffs. It is traditionally played on the Friday after Thanksgiving, which is the same day which the IHSA plays its smaller school state championships in football. As of the 2009 game, the Catholic League holds a 51–23–2 advantage in the series.

In 1981, the IHSA membership voted on a limitation that prohibited member schools from participating in more than nine games, plus the IHSA state series. The Prep Bowl was given a special exemption from this.

== Notable alumni ==
Bishop McNamara

- Thomas Guynes – lineman for Michigan and Arizona Cardinals
- Tyjuan Hagler – NFL linebacker, played for the Indianapolis Colts (Super Bowl XLI champions)
- Mike Kimberlin – Running Back
- Ron Young – Retired Fire Chief of Kankakee, Football Captain (78), Wrestling Coach (91-04)

Brother Rice

- Jim Adduci – MLB outfielder, starred collegiately at Southern Illinois
- Bob Cummings – drafted #5 overall in the 1978 MLB Draft by the San Francisco Giants
- David Diehl – offensive tackle for the New York Giants
- Mark Donahue – former guard with the Cincinnati Bengals
- Bobby Frasor – McDonald's HS All-American point guard, starred collegiately at North Carolina, where he won the 2009 national title
- Phil Hicks – NBA forward, drafted #27 in 1976, starred collegiately at Tulane
- Rico Hill – NBA forward, drafted #31 in 1999, starred collegiately at Illinois State
- Paul Hutchins – tackle for the Green Bay Packers
- Pete Mackanin – MLB infielder (1973–81), manager of Pittsburgh Pirates and Cincinnati Reds
- John Meyer – AFL linebacker and NFL assistant coach, starred collegiately at Notre Dame
- Ed Olczyk – NHL center and Stanley Cup champion, head coach and broadcaster with the Chicago Blackhawks and Pittsburgh Penguins
- Lance Ten Broeck – PGA golfer currently on the Senior Tour, won 1984 Illinois Open Championship, starred collegiately as an All-American at Texas

DeLaSalle

- Brian Bogusevic – Houston Astros outfielder
- Jocko Conlan – Hall of Fame baseball umpire
- George Connor – Chicago Bears, 1948–1955
- Moose Krause – Basketball Hall of Famer
- LaRue Martin – Loyola basketball star, No. 1 NBA draft pick
- Lou Pote – pitcher for Anaheim Angels
- Renaldo Wynn – defensive end for the Washington Redskins and Jacksonville Jaguars

DePaul Academy

- Bill Muellner – played football for the Chicago Cardinals as well as for the Los Angeles Bulldogs, Cincinnati Bengals, and New York Yanks
- Bill Steinkemper – played football for the Cincinnati Bengals and Chicago Bears
- Dick Evans – played football for the Green Bay Packers and Chicago Bears
- Steve Juzwik – played football for the Washington Redskins, then had three seasons in the All-American Football League with the Buffalo Bisons (1946–47) and Chicago Rockets (1948)
- Joey Meyer – head coach of DePaul men's basketball

Fenwick

- Johnny Lattner – Heisman Trophy winner for Notre Dame
- Corey Maggette – NBA player
- Mike Rabold – NFL player
- Ken Sitzberger – gold medalist diver, 1964 Summer Olympics
- Robert Spillane -- NFL player
- Marques Sullivan – NFL player
- John Teerlinck – NFL player

Gordon Tech

- Chris Bourjos – MLB player for the San Francisco Giants in 1980
- Gregg Bingham – (Class of 1969) – former Houston Oilers linebacker
- Larry Langowski – wrestler who represented Mexico in the 120 kilogram weight class at the 2008 Summer Olympics
- Robert Meschbach – professional soccer player who set the (then) national high school record with 71 goals in one season; remains an Illinois state record (as of 2008).
- Ron Plantz – (Class of 1982) offensive lineman (center) for Notre Dame 1982–1986 and Indianapolis Colts 1987–90
- Frank Santana – (Class of 1974) 1977 NCAA wrestling national champion (190 lbs.) and three-time wrestling All-American at Iowa State; first Cuban-American to win a collegiate wrestling national championship
- Jitim Young – basketball player who played at Northwestern University and professionally in Europe and the Dominican Republic

Hales Franciscan

- Rich Gardner – defensive back for the Tennessee Titans
- Jerome Randle – player in Turkish Basketball League
- JaVale McGee – NBA player

Holy Cross

- Garrett Wolfe – Northern Illinois and Chicago Bears player

Leo

- Chris Watson – NFL player for the Denver Broncos
- Harold Blackmon – Northwestern and NFL player
- Jason Jefferson – NFL player for the Buffalo Bills
- Andre Brown – former forward for NBA's Memphis Grizzlies

Loyola Academy

- Bert Metzger – member of College Football Hall of Fame
- Matt Cherry – played football for the Cincinnati Bengals
- Conor Dwyer – 2012 gold medalist USA 4x200-meter freestyle relay swim team
- Dave Finzer – NFL punter for the Chicago Bears and Seattle Seahawks
- Christian Friedrich – first-round pick of the Colorado Rockies in the 2008 Major League Baseball draft
- Charlie Leibrandt – played baseball for the Cincinnati Reds (1979–1982), Kansas City Royals (1984–1989), Atlanta Braves (1990–1992), Texas Rangers (1993)
- Tim Foley – played football for the Miami Dolphins
- Paul McNulty – played end for the Chicago Cardinals
- Nick Rassas – last two-way player at the University of Notre Dame, NFL player
- John Scanlan – played guard and halfback for the Chicago Cardinals and Louisville Colonels
- Bob Skoglund – played football for the Green Bay Packers
- Freddie Lindstrom – member of the Baseball Hall of Fame
- Al Montoya – first-round (6th overall) selection of NHL's New York Rangers in 2004

Mount Carmel

- Elmer Angsman – played halfback for the Chicago Cardinals
- Denny McLain – Cy Young Award winner for 1968 World Series champion Detroit Tigers
- Frank Cornish – offensive lineman for Super Bowl champion Dallas Cowboys of 1992 and 1993
- Mel McCants – former Purdue and Los Angeles Lakers forward
- Chris Calloway – former New York Giants wide receiver
- Hal Cherne – played offensive line for the Boston Redskins
- Bob Davis – played guard for the Los Angeles Rams
- Simeon Rice – played defensive end for the Tampa Bay Buccaneers and Arizona Cardinals
- Joe Williams – six-time U.S. national champion and 2004 Olympian
- Donovan McNabb – five-time all pro quarterback for the Philadelphia Eagles, currently with the Washington Redskins
- Antoine Walker – three-time NBA All Star
- Matt Cushing – Pittsburgh Steelers tight end, 1999–2005
- Chris Chelios – NHL player for Detroit Red Wings and Chicago Blackhawks
- Steve Lawson – played offensive line for the Cincinnati Bengals, Minnesota Vikings, and San Francisco 49ers
- Matt Kerrigan – played quarterback for the New England Patriots
- Dan Goich – played defensive tackle for the Detroit Lions, New York Giants, and New Orleans Saints
- Darrell Hill – Kansas City Chiefs wide receiver
- Bob Gonya – played offensive tackle for the Philadelphia Eagles
- Tony Furjanic – Notre Dame and NFL linebacker
- Steve Edwards – Chicago Bears and New York Giants offensive tackle

St. George

- Tony Barone – head basketball coach at Creighton University, Texas A&M, and the Memphis Grizzlies

St. Ignatius

- Tom O'Hara – Olympian and former world record holder for indoor mile and NCAA champion in Division I cross country
- Mark Dalesandro – MLB catcher and infielder (1994–1995, 1998–1999, 2001).

St. Laurence

- Jim Dwyer – 17 seasons of Major League Baseball, member of Baltimore Orioles 1983 World Series champions
- Tim Grunhard – Notre Dame and Kansas City Chiefs center, Pro Bowl center
- Stan Smagala – played football for the Dallas Cowboys
- Kevin Bracken – Olympic Greco-Roman wrestler
- Jeff Kacmarek – played nose tackle for the Detroit Lions
- Jim Davey – Detective for the Chicago Ridge Police department and 2019 Officer of the Year

St. Mel

- Walt Barnes – played football for the Washington Redskins and Denver Broncos
- Tom Bettis – played football for the Green Bay Packers, Pittsburgh Steelers, and Chicago Bears
- Tom Keating – played football for the Buffalo Bills, Oakland Raiders, Pittsburgh Steelers, and Kansas City Chiefs
- Bernie Leahy – played football for the Chicago Bears
- Frank Quilici – Major League Baseball player, second baseman in 1965 World Series for Minnesota Twins; manager of Twins 1972–75

St. Rita

- Chuck Brodnicki – running back for the Brooklyn Dodgers
- Matt Conrath – played for the St. Louis Rams
- Dennis Lick – offensive lineman for the Chicago Bears
- Tony Simmons – NFL wide receiver
- Ahmad Merritt – NFL wide receiver (Arizona Cardinals) and Chicago Rush (Arena League) player
- Ed Farmer – MLB All-Star in 1980 and play-by-play voice of Chicago White Sox from 1991-2019
- Tom Flaherty – played for the Cincinnati Bengals
- Darius Fleming – Super bowl champion with the New England Patriots; played at University of Notre Dame
- Nick Etten – MLB All-Star first baseman
- Bruce Gaston – former player for the New England Patriots, Green Bay Packers, and Chicago Bears
- Jim Clancy – former Toronto Blue Jays pitcher, All-Star in 1982
- Ron Weissenhofer – linebacker for the New Orleans Saints
- Bob Zimny – tackle for the Chicago Cardinals
- Mike Kafka – Current quarterbacks coach for the Kansas City Chiefs; played at Northwestern University and was quarterback for the Philadelphia Eagles
- Ryan Donahue – kicker for the Detroit Lions
- Kenny Golladay- Pro Bowl wide receiver for the New York Giants; attended Northern Illinois University and North Dakota University
- Pat O'Connor - Super Bowl champion with the Tampa Bay Buccaneers
- Charles Matthews - NBA G-League player, played for the Michigan Wolverines
- Kevin Carberry - current offensive line coach for the Los Angeles Rams
- Mark Payton - MLB player, previously with the Cincinnati Reds
- Tony Zych - MLB pitcher, previously with the Seattle Mariners

Providence Catholic

- Pete Bercich – NFL linebacker (1995–98, 2000) for Minnesota Vikings
- Brad Guzan – goalkeeper for Chivas USA and Aston Villa of English Premier League; starting goalkeeper for 2008 U.S. Olympic team
- Carmen Pignatiello – pitched for Chicago Cubs (2008)
- Bryan Rekar – Major League Baseball pitcher (1995–2002)
- Eric Steinbach – NFL offensive lineman
- Miles Boykin - NFL wide receiver for Baltimore Ravens and Pittsburgh Steelers

Weber

- Mike Krzyzewski ("Coach K") – Duke University and Team USA basketball coach
- William Joseph "Moose" Skowron Jr. – first baseman for New York Yankees, five-time AL All-Star (1957, 1958, 1959–61)

== Membership timeline ==
Beginning in 1912, the Chicago Catholic League competes in 11 boys, 13 girls and 13 coed sports and activities within the IHSA.

Chicago Catholic League full members Chicago Catholic League members (non-football)

Other conference Other conference

== Notes ==
1. Men's teams representing Joliet Catholic are stylized as the "Hilltoppers", while women's teams are stylized as the "Angels". This dates to the merger of the all–male Joliet Catholic High School (Hilltoppers) with the all–female St. Francis Academy (Angels) in 1990.
2. Boys Basketball Only
