= Guerin College Preparatory High School =

Private secondary school in River Grove, Illinois, United States

Location
- 8001 West Belmont Avenue; River Grove, Illinois 60171; United States
- Coordinates: 41°56′13″N 87°49′39″W

Information
- Other name: Guerin Prep
- Former name: Mother Theodore Guerin High School
- Type: Private, secondary
- Religious affiliation: Roman Catholic
- Established: 1962
- Founder: Sisters of Providence of Saint Mary-of-the-Woods
- Status: Closed
- Closed: 2020
- Oversight: Roman Catholic Archdiocese of Chicago
- Grades: 9–12
- Gender: Co-educational
- Enrollment: 302 (2018)
- Student to teacher ratio: 17:1
- Campus type: Suburban
- Colors: Red, White and Navy Blue
- Athletics conference: Metro Suburban Conference (m); Girls Catholic Athletic Conference (f)
- Accreditation: North Central Association of Colleges and Schools
- Newspaper: Voyager
- Yearbook: Traces
- Tuition: US$ 10900
- Website: guerinprep.sistersofprovidence.org

Guerin Preparatory High School was a private Catholic high school in River Grove, Illinois, United States. It was located in the Archdiocese of Chicago.

== History ==
Guerin was established in 1962 as Mother Theodore Guerin High School, an all-girls school, by the Sisters of Providence of Saint Mary-of-the-Woods. The sisters named the school after their congregation's foundress, Mother Théodore Guérin.

The school was renamed when it became coeducational in 2004 and absorbed the students from the all-male Holy Cross High School, after that school closed. Holy Cross High School had been opened in 1961.

Guerin closed permanently after the 2019–20 academic year due to declining enrollment, increased need in financial aid for students, and lower than expected fundraising results.

== Athletics ==
The Guerin Prep Crusaders/Gators were members of two athletic conferences: men (Crusaders) compete as a member of the Metro Suburban Conference, while the women (Gators) compete in both the Metro Suburban Conference and Suburban Christian Conference. Formerly, the all-boys Holy Cross High School competed in the East Suburban Catholic Conference until consolidating with the all-girls Mother Guerin High School in 2004.

The school sponsored interscholastic sports teams for both men and women in basketball, volleyball, cross country, soccer, golf, and track & field. The school sponsors teams for men in baseball, football, and wrestling, while there are teams for women in softball.

The school competed in state championship tournaments sponsored by the Illinois High School Association.

Guerin Prep has achieved memorable success in several sports. The following teams are notable for success in their respective sports:

- Basketball (men's): 2005 Regional Champions, 2008 Regional Champions
- Basketball (women's): 2010 Regional Champions, 2011 Regional Champions, 2012 Regional Champions
- Baseball: 2007 Regional Champions, 2008 Regional Champions, 2014 Regional Champions, 2015 Regional Champions
- Softball: 2008 Regional Champions, 2009 Regional Champions, 2010 Sectional Champions, 2011 Regional Champions, 2012 Regional Champions
- Volleyball (women's): 2008 Regional Champions, 2012 Regional Champions
- Wrestling: 2012 State Finalist Class 1A, 2012 Individual Regional Champions (4), 2013 State Finalist Class 1A, 2013 Individual Regional Champions (4), 2014 State Finalist Class 1A, 2014 Individual Regional Champion (1)
- Ice Hockey: 2007 Junior Varsity State Champions, 2008 Junior Varsity State Champions
- Cross Country (men's): 2008 State Finalist Class 2A
- Cross Country (women's): 2010 State Finalist Class 2A, 2011 Individual Sectional Champion
- Track & Field (men's): 2012 State Finalist Class 1A Long Jump, 2013 State Finalist Class 1A Long Jump, 2014 State Finalist Class 1A Long Jump
- Track & Field (women's): 2010 Individual Sectional Champion 3200-meter, 2010 State Finalist Class 1A 3200-meter, 2011 Individual Sectional Champion 3200-meter, 2011 State Finalist Class 1A 3200-meter
