= IC Catholic Prep (Elmhurst, Illinois) =

Private high school in Illinois, United States

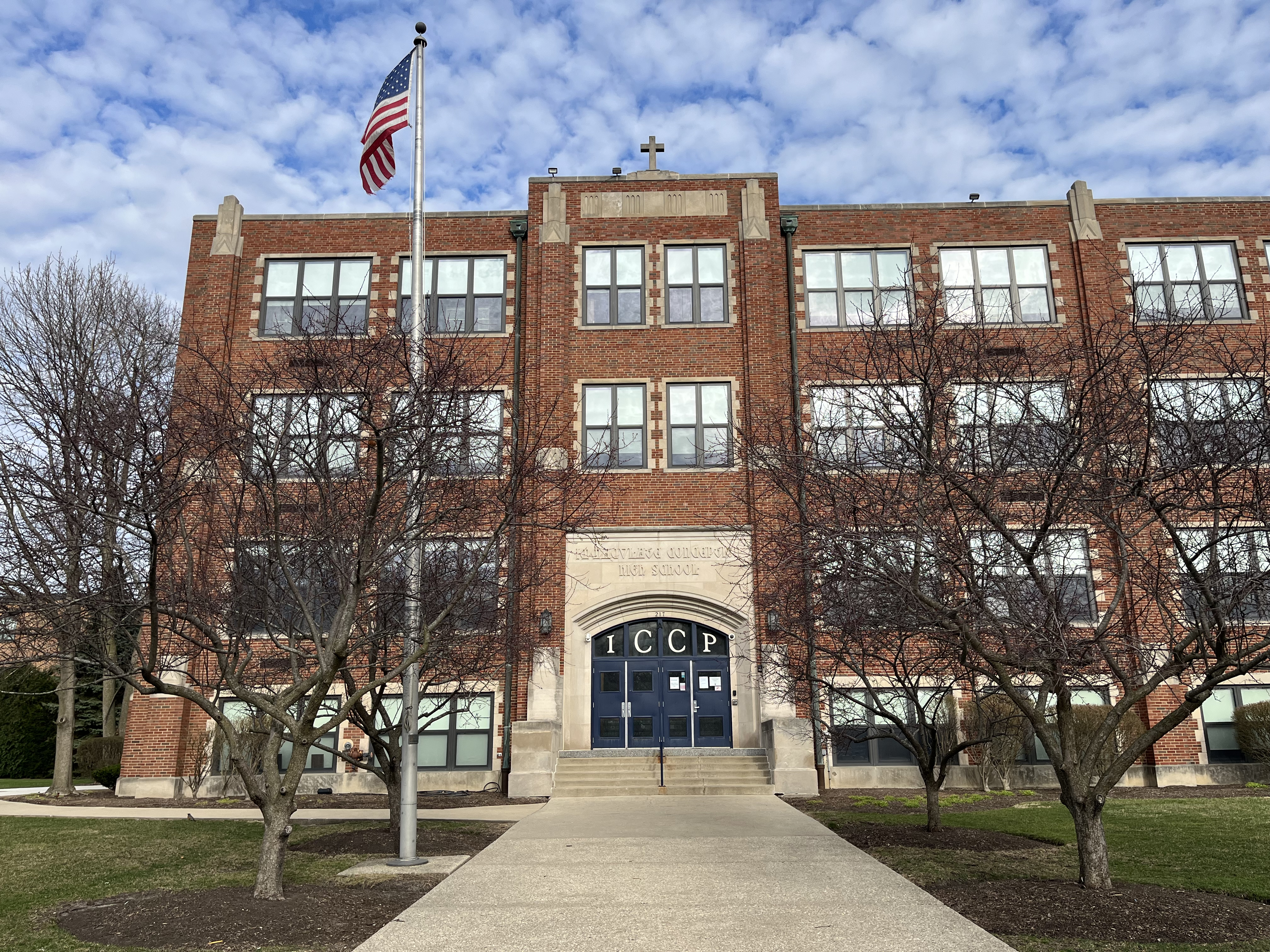

Location
- 217 Cottage Hill Avenue; Elmhurst, Illinois 60126; United States; 41°53′47″N 87°56′31″W

Information
- Type: Private secondary school
- Denomination: Roman Catholic
- Opened: 1936
- Oversight: Diocese of Joliet
- Principal: Danielle Wagner
- Pastor: Very Rev. Thomas Paul
- Grades: 9–12
- Gender: Coed
- Student to teacher ratio: 17:1
- Colors: Navy Blue and White
- Slogan: The School for Independent Thinkers
- Athletics conference: Chicago Catholic League
- Team name: Knights
- Accreditation: North Central Association of Colleges and Schools
- Newspaper: Knight Times
- Yearbook: Postscript
- Tuition: $13,800
- Website: www.iccatholicprep.org

IC Catholic Prep (ICCP) is a private, Roman Catholic high school in Elmhurst, Illinois, and located in the Roman Catholic Diocese of Joliet in Illinois. When opened in 1936, it was the only co-educational secondary institution in DuPage County. The Sisters of St. Agnes have offered a curriculum incorporating a college prep focus since its founding. It is the oldest Catholic, coeducational high school in DuPage County, Illinois. It is also the only parish-based high school in DuPage County.

In January 2013, IC High School was renamed IC Catholic Prep to reflect the school's pursuit and teaching of Catholic values.

Pulling from more than 38 different suburban communities, ICCP has an average class size 19:1.

== Courses ==
IC Catholic Prep offers 25+ Advanced Placement and Honors classes in addition to its regular course offerings IC Catholic prep has the best Fine Arts program (Music, Art, and Drama). ICCP offers extracurricular activities including National Honor Society, Art club, Book club, Engineering Club, Theater, Math Team, Student Council, and Yearbook.

== Athletics ==
The football program has won six IHSA State Championships spanning from 2002 to 2022. Years (and divisions) of championships: 2002(3A), 2008(2A), 2016(3A), 2017(3A), 2018(4A), 2022(3A). In 2008, the Immaculate Conception football team became the first 4 loss football team in IHSA history to win a state championship, winning the class 2a football state championship. The 2008 football state championship squad posted a record of 10 wins and 4 losses, winning their final 6 games.

The dance team won state in 2012 and placed second in state in 2013. In 2016 the dance team also placed top ten at the IHSA state competition and placed first and second at every competition they attended.

The volleyball team won the IHSA class 2A State Championship in 2013.

In 2018, the wrestling team qualified for the IHSA Class 1A Team State Finals for the first time in school history.

In 2023, the girls soccer team took fourth place in IHSA Class 1A.

== Notable alumni ==
- Edwin Feulner, co-founder and former president, The Heritage Foundation
- Bob McMillen, former indoor arena football player and head coach
- Skip Pitlock, former professional baseball player, Chicago White Sox and San Francisco Giants
