= Wheaton Academy =

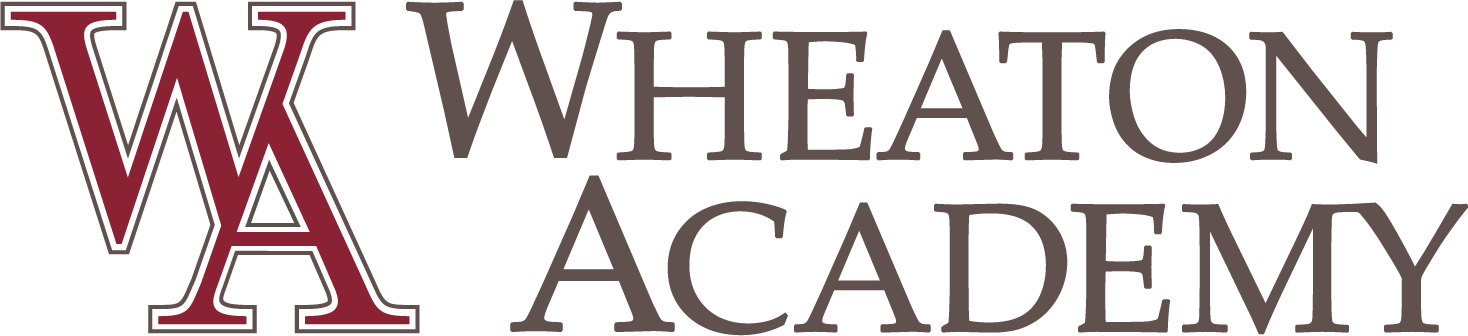
- Wheaton Academy logo until 2019

Location
- 900 Prince Crossing Road; West Chicago, Illinois, Illinois 60185; United States; 41°54′05″N 88°11′11″W

Information
- Other name: WA
- Former name: Wheaton Christian High School
- Type: Private high school
- Motto: Latin: Soli Deo gloria ("To God alone be the glory")
- Religious affiliation: Evangelical Christian
- Established: 1853; 173 years ago
- NCES School ID: 00350496
- Principal: Brad Thornton
- Head of school: Steve Bult
- Teaching staff: 45.6 (on an FTE basis)
- Grades: 9–12
- Gender: Co-educational
- Enrollment: 661 (2019-2020)
- Student to teacher ratio: 14.5
- Colors: Maroon, white, and grey
- Athletics conference: Illinois High School Association; Chicagoland Christian Conference
- Mascot: Warrior
- Rival: Timothy Christian Saint Francis College Prep
- Yearbook: Compass
- Website: wheatonacademy.org

Wheaton Academy (WA) is a private, Christian, co-educational high school in West Chicago, Illinois, which was established as part of the Illinois Institute by a group of evangelical abolitionists in 1853. The Illinois Institute was reorganized into Wheaton College and Wheaton College Academy, a preparatory school, in 1860. Wheaton Academy established an independent campus in West Chicago in 1945.

== History ==
Wheaton Academy was founded as a part of the Illinois Institute in 1853 by evangelical abolitionists. In 1855, they were granted permission to form a college. The first head of the school was Jonathan Blanchard. At this time, the institute was organised into Wheaton College, and a prep school, known as Wheaton College Academy. In 1915, under Dean William Rice, the academy began to achieve its own identity, by acquiring its own separate faculty and building on the campus of Wheaton College. In 1945, the school moved off of the Wheaton College campus to a location in West Chicago, Illinois. The school was equipped with dormitories for boarding students. The Aurora and Elgin train line also ran north of the schools location, making it accessible to student commuters. In 1951, campus facilities were complete. Until 1963, Wheaton College was still financially supporting the academy. After 1963, support for the academy waned, and in 1970, Wheaton College decided to close the academy permanently. Parents and board members, however, eager to see the institution survive, continued the school themselves. It was renamed to Wheaton Christian High School, and the dormitories were closed.

The school underwent building advancements in 1979 and 1983, respectively. In 1995, the school was again renamed to Wheaton Academy. The school completed building advancements in 2025 to replace a section of the old campus, known as Academy Hall. In its stead, the building additions include a new business center and Idea Lab space.

== Academics ==
WA is a member of the Association of Christian Schools International, recognized by the state of Illinois and the DuPage County Education Service Region. The school was awarded a National Blue Ribbon from the U.S. Department of Education in 2019.

The school offers classes in all core subjects, in addition to a variety of electives in fine arts, visual arts, media arts, computer science, and robotics. The school also offers a variety of AP classes accredited by the College Board. Wheaton Academy offers three foreign languages at various levels: French, Spanish, and Mandarin Chinese.

=== Academic facilities ===
Wheaton Academy has 3 buildings used for academics. The Academic Building (main building) hosts a variety of classes, including math, science, history, languages, and English, along with several non-traditional classes. Academy Hall was used for history classes taught in its historic building and was used as storage space, until its demolition in 2023. The fine arts facilities include a multipurpose performance hall, a visual arts room, and a ceramics studio. Students can access a maker space called the “Idea Lab” with woodworking materials, laser cutter machines, welding and metallurgy equipment, and 3D printers. The athletic building is utilised for physical education and health classes.

== Athletics ==
The "Warriors" compete in baseball, boys' basketball, girls' basketball, boys' cross country, girls' cross country, football, boys' golf, girls' golf, boys' lacrosse, jousting, boys' soccer, girls' soccer, softball, boys' tennis, girls' tennis, girls' volleyball, boys' volleyball, and wrestling. Until 2023, the academy was a member of the Metro Suburban Conference of the Illinois High School Association. After the 2023 school year they joined the new Chicagoland Christian Conference. They also offer boys and girls swimming and sideline cheering.

=== State titles ===
| Sport | Division | Year |
|---|---|---|
| Mens' Golf | AA | 2009 † |
| Mens' Soccer | 2A | 2014 |
| Mens' Soccer | 1A | 2021 |
| Womens' Soccer | A | 2004 |
| Womens' Soccer | AA | 2009 |
| Womens' Soccer | A | 2016 |
| Mens' Lacrosse | A | 2023 |
| Mens' Lacrosse | A | 2026 |

† Tie

=== Athletic facilities ===
The school's athletic facilities include Heritage Fieldhouse with four basketball courts, Performance Trust Field for football, soccer, and lacrosse, one baseball and one softball diamond, seven tennis courts, and a weight room.

== Notable alumni ==
=== Business ===
- Wess Stafford, class of 1967, chief executive, activist, and author
- Robert Van Kampen, class of 1960, businessman and founder of Van Kampen Investments

=== Christian ministry ===
- R. Kenneth Strachan, missionary
- Jon M. Sweeney, class of 1985, writer

=== Politics and culture ===
- Randy Hultgren, class of 1984, congressman
- Todd Beamer, class of 1985, passenger on United Airlines Flight 93 during the September 11 attacks

=== Sports ===
- Jake Cousins, class of 2013, MLB player
- Ryan Dzingel, class of 2010, NHL player
- Christian Fischer, class of 2013, NHL player
- Leah Fortune, class of 2009, Brazil women's national football team
- Grant Stoneman, class of 2014, USL player
- Crystal Thomas, class of 2012, NWSL player
- JD Gunn, class of 2018, MLS Next Pro player
