= East Suburban Catholic Conference =

Schools sports body in Chicago

- Conference: IHSA
- Founded: 1974
- Folded: 2026
- No. of teams: 9
- Region: Suburbs of Chicago, Illinois

Locations of Current ESCC Schools

The East Suburban Catholic Conference (ESCC) was an athletic conference consisting of nine Catholic high schools in the suburbs of Chicago, Illinois (though despite its name, two schools are located in the city itself). The conference had become independent in 1974.

While originally only supporting competition in men's sports, the conference began supporting women's athletics in 1991. At its peak, there were eleven women's teams and ten men's teams.

Despite not being as old as other conferences, and not having any women's sports until relatively recent history, the teams in the conference had finished in the top four of Illinois High School Association (IHSA) sponsored state tournaments 76 times in nine different sports.

== Membership (2026) ==
School	Town	Team Name	Colors	IHSA Classes (2/3/4)	Reference
Benet Academy	Lisle	Redwings		AA/3A/4A	
Carmel High School	Mundelein	Corsairs		AA/3A/4A	
Joliet Catholic Academy	Joliet	Hilltoppers/Angels^{1}		AA/2A/3A	
Marian Catholic High School	Chicago Heights	Spartans		AA/2A/3A	
Marist High School	Chicago	RedHawks		AA/3A/4A	
Nazareth Academy	La Grange Park	Roadrunners		AA/2A/3A	
Notre Dame College Prep	Niles	Dons		AA/3A/4A	
St. Patrick High School	Chicago	Shamrocks		AA/3A/4A	
St. Viator High School	Arlington Heights	Lions		AA/2A/3A	

== Membership timeline ==
Beginning in 1960 as a portion of the Suburban Catholic Conference, the East Suburban Catholic Conference became independent in 1974 with competition in 11 boys, 13 girls and 13 coed sports and activities within the IHSA.

Suburban Catholic Conference East Suburban Catholic Conference full members

Notre Dame and St. Patrick are all male institutions, and thus do not field women's teams. The rest of the schools are coed, and are represented in the ESCC by both their men's and women's teams. Marian Central Catholic High School joined at the end of 2013-2014 football season for all sports except football. Marian Central Catholic began competing in the ESCC for football in the 2014–2015 season.

Somewhat unusual by the standards of the metropolitan Chicago area, the conference was spread over a four county area. While most of the members are in Cook County. Joliet Catholic is in Will County to Chicago's southwest. Benet Academy is in DuPage County which is to the west of Chicago. Carmel is far to the north in Lake County. The distance between the furthest schools (Carmel and Marian Catholic) is approximately 66 miles (106.2 km).

== History ==
The conference can trace its roots back to the founding of the Suburban Catholic Conference in 1960. Among the six founding members, only Joliet Catholic, Notre Dame, and Benet Academy (then known as St. Procopius) are currently ESCC members. Carmel joined in 1966.

In 1970, Joliet Catholic temporarily left, with four new schools joining: Marist, St. Joseph, St. Patrick, and St. Viator. With the conference now at 14, the conference divided into two divisions. The East Division included the four new schools, Carmel, Notre Dame, and Holy Cross High School. In 1971 St. Francis de Sales High School joined the East Division.

In 1974, the two divisions split forming the West Suburban Catholic Conference and the ESCC (in 1989, the West Suburban Catholic Conference would drop the "West" and return to using the original conference name). After one year, St. Joseph left to pursue one year as an independent school, and came back to replace St. Francis de Sales which left after the 1975–76 season. Joliet Catholic joined in 1982. The conference elected to expand in 1990 by adding Benet Academy and Marian Catholic.

As a result of the number of coed schools in the conference, the conference began sponsoring competition for women in 1991.

In 1996, for football only, the ESCC and Chicago Catholic League merged to form the Chicago Metro League. This relationship ended after the 2002 football season, with Holy Cross High School joining the Chicago Catholic League permanently for all sports, and Nazareth Academy joining the ESCC.

In 2010, St. Joseph High School withdrew from the conference.

In 2022, Marian Central Catholic High School in Woodstock IL, withdrew from the conference.

In 2026, nine members of East Suburban Catholic Conference merged with the Chicago Catholic League and the Girls Catholic Athletic Conference.

== Sports sponsored ==
The conference had sponsored competition for men and women in basketball, cross country, golf, lacrosse, soccer, tennis, track and field, and volleyball. Men's competition was sponsored in baseball, football, and wrestling, while competition for women was sponsored in softball. With each sport, the conference had recognized "All-Conference" and "Scholar Athlete" performances. All of these sports have state tournaments sponsored by the Illinois High School Association (IHSA).

== Top finishes ==
The following teams, while members of the ESCC, finished in the top four of their respective state tournaments sponsored by the IHSA.

- Baseball: Carmel (3rd 2003–04) • Joliet Catholic 3rd place (2007–08); 2nd place (1989–90, 99–2000, 03–04); State Champions (1993–94), (2008–09), (2012–13) • Marist (3rd 2000–01; State Champions 1977–78) • Notre Dame (State Champions 2003–04) • St. Patrick (2nd 2005–06) • St. Viator (4th 2015–16; State Champions 2016–17) • Marian Catholic (State Champions 2011–12; 2nd 2016–17) • Nazareth Academy (State Champions 2021–22, 4th 2010–11, 3rd 2011–12, 2017–18, 2nd 2014-15)
- Basketball (boys): St. Joseph (4th 1983–84; 3rd 86–87; 2nd 77–78; State Champions 98–99) • Benet (2nd 2013–14), (2nd 2015–16) • Marian Catholic (3rd 2017–18) • St. Patrick (3rd 2024–25)
- Basketball (girls): Bishop McNamara (4th 07–08) • Benet (State Champions 2014–15, 15–16); • Fenwick (3rd 1999–2000, 03–04; 2nd 02–03; State Champions 00–01, 06–07) • Marian Catholic (4th 2003–04; 3rd 06–07; 2nd 01–02), (State Champions 2012–13), (3rd 2013–14,) • Joliet Catholic (2nd 2013–14) • Marist (4th 07–08) • Nazareth Academy (2nd 17–18)
- Cheerleading: Marist (3rd 2011–12), ( 2nd 2012–13), (2nd 2017–18), (2nd 2018–19) • Saint Viator (1st 2011–12)
- Cross Country (boys): Benet (3rd 1991–92) • Marist (4th 1982–83; 3rd 96–97 1st 10)
- Cross Country (girls): Benet (4th 1996–97; 3rd 2006–07; State Champions 2019–20)
- Football: Carmel (State Champions 2003–04) • Joliet Catholic (2nd 1992–93, 96–97, 09–10, 11–12, 2023–24, 24–25; State Champions 1975–76, 76–77, 77–78, 78–79, 81–82, 87–88, 90–91, 99–00, 00–01, 01–02, 03–04, 04–05, 07–08, 2018–19, 2021–22) • Marian Catholic (State Champions 1993–94, 2nd 1999–2000) • Marist (2nd 1986–87, 09–10, 15–16) • Notre Dame (2nd 1989–90) • Nazareth Academy (State Champions 2014–15, 15– 16, 18–19, 2022–23, 23–24, 24–25, 2nd 2017–18, 2nd 2017–18, 2019–20)
- Golf (boys): Carmel (3rd 1975–76) • St. Viator (3rd 1983–84; 2nd 2006–07; State Champions 2003–04 07–08, 08–09) • Nazareth Academy (4th 2018–19)
- Golf (girls): Marian Catholic (4th 2006–07; 3rd 07–08; 2nd 05–06)
- Soccer (boys): Benet (State Champions 2000–01, 01–02; 3rd 2016–17) • St. Joseph (4th 1984–85, 2004–05; 3rd 1989–90, 99–2000; 2nd 1997–98) • St. Viator (4th 2001–02; 3rd 1996–97, 97–98, 2004–05; 2nd 2000–01; State Champions 2003–04) • St. Patrick (3rd 2019–20)
- Soccer (girls): Fenwick (4th 2003–04) • St. Viator (State Champions 2001–02, 02–03, 04–05)
- Softball: Benet (3rd 2010–11) • Fenwick (4th 1997–98) • Marist (State Champions 2011–12, 14–15, 4th 2016–17) • Nazareth Academy (4th 2016–17)
- Volleyball (boys): Marist (4th 1995–96; State Champions 2001–02, 10–11)
- Volleyball (girls): Joliet Catholic (4th 1998–99, 2005–06; 3rd 2006–07; State Champions 2003–04 08–09) • Benet (2nd 2008–-09, State Champions 2011–12, 12–13, 14–15)• Marian Catholic (State Champions 2016–17) • Marian Central Catholic (2nd 2016–17)
- Wrestling: Marist (3rd 1984–85, 88–89, 90–91; 2nd 96–97; State Champions 82–83, 86–87)

== Hall of Fame ==
Since 2006, the conference has recognized administrators, coaches, and former athletes for their excellence. Among the notable inductees:

- Mike Alstott (Joliet Catholic) •• Class of 2006 •• fullback for the NFL Tampa Bay Buccaneers
- Jim Les (Notre Dame) •• Class of 2006 •• NBA guard, Former head men's basketball coach at Bradley University
- Allie Quigley (Joliet Catholic) •• Class of 2018 •• WNBA Champion, 4x WNBA Three Point Shootout Champion
- Scott Stahoviak (Carmel) •• Class of 2007 •• Major League Baseball first baseman and first round draft pick (1991) for the Minnesota Twins
- Isiah Thomas (St. Joseph) •• Class of 2006 •• NBA player, coach, executive
- Jeff Zgonina (Carmel) •• Class of 2006 •• NFL defensive tackle

== Notes ==
1. Men's teams representing Joliet Catholic are stylized as the "Hilltoppers", while women's teams are stylized as the "Angels". This dates to the merger of the all–male Joliet Catholic High School (Hilltoppers) with the all–female St. Francis Academy (Angels) in 1990.
