= Aurora Central Catholic High School =

Location
- 1255 North Edgelawn Drive; Aurora, Illinois 60506; United States; 41°46′58″N 88°21′30″W

Information
- Type: private
- Denomination: Roman Catholic
- Established: 1968
- Principal: Paul Mayer
- Grades: 9–12
- Gender: coed
- Enrollment: 450 (2023)
- Student to teacher ratio: 28:1
- Colors: Blue and Gold
- Athletics conference: CCL & GCAC
- Mascot: Chargers
- Team name: Chargers
- Accreditation: North Central Association of Colleges and Schools
- Newspaper: Central Times
- Tuition: $4,625-$5,350 (1st child)
- Website: https://www.auroracentral.com/

Aurora Central Catholic High School (ACC) is a Roman Catholic secondary school under the direction of the Diocese of Rockford. ACC began as two separate secondary schools in 1926 and 1962. Madonna Catholic High School, a girls school, and Roncalli High School, a boys school, merged in 1968 to become Aurora Central Catholic. The first campus was located on the east side of Aurora, Illinois, in what is now Cowherd Middle School. The school moved to its current location, on Aurora's west side, in 1995. The 2023 student body was about 450 students.

== Academics ==
Aurora Central Catholic requires 28 credits for graduation. However, because of the block scheduling system, many students graduate with 30 or 32 credits. There is a wide range of courses and levels offered which includes honors, independent study, and Advanced Placement (AP) courses.

The Aurora Central Catholic High School Class of 2009 had ten Illinois State Scholars. This year ACC claimed its college-bound students earned over $5.2 million in scholarship money. This amount is higher than the Class of 2006's $3.7 million. Over 95% of ACC graduates go on to secondary education at various respective universities and colleges throughout the country. The school was recognized as one of the top 50 Catholic high schools in the United States in 2004 and 2005.

Principals, 1968–Present
James Swann	1968-1986
Robert Stewart	1987-1997
Randy Thomas	1997-2000
Fr. William Etheredge	2000–2022
Paul Mayer	2022–present

== Athletics ==
ACC participates in multiple classes (depending on the sport) in the Illinois High School Association. ACC is a member of the Chicago Catholic League for boys and the Girls Catholic Athletic Conference for girls as of the 2023-24 school year. Teams are stylized as the Chargers.

== Notable alumni ==
- Joe Birkett, Judge of the Illinois Appellate Court, former DuPage County, Illinois, State's Attorney
- Tim Buckley, NCAA Men's Basketball Coach for Iowa State University Cyclones
- Kevin Dunn, actor
- Bob Kipper, Major League Baseball player and coach
- Kathleen Vinehout, Wisconsin State Senate
