= Nazareth Academy (La Grange Park, Illinois) =

School in LaGrange Park, Illinois, United States

Location
- 1209 West Ogden Avenue; La Grange Park, Illinois 60526; United States; 41.8204°N 87.8863°W

Information
- Type: private, secondary, parochial
- Denomination: Roman Catholic
- Established: 1900
- Oversight: Archdiocese of Chicago
- President: Deborah Tracy
- Principal: Therese Hawkins
- Grades: 9–12
- Gender: coed
- Campus: suburban
- Colors: Columbia blue, White and Navy blue
- Athletics conference: Chicago Catholic League, Girls Catholic Athletic Conference
- Mascot: Rocky Roadrunner
- Team name: Roadrunners
- Accreditation: North Central Association of Colleges and Schools
- Newspaper: The Announcer
- Yearbook: The Alexine
- Tuition: US$18,200
- Affiliation: Sisters of St. Joseph
- Website: nazarethacademy.com

Nazareth Academy is a Roman Catholic college-preparatory high school located in LaGrange Park, Illinois, United States, in the Roman Catholic Archdiocese of Chicago. It was founded in 1900 by the Sisters of St. Joseph.

== Academics ==
Students take courses at any of three levels: college prep, honors, or Advanced Placement (AP).

Nazareth's average ACT score is 25.6. The top quarter of the class of 2016 averaged a score of 31.

== Athletics ==
Nazareth Academy offers 23 interscholastic sports.

Nazareth competes in the Chicago Catholic League (CCL) and Girls Catholic Athletic Conference (GCAC) and is a member of the Illinois High School Association. In support of IHSA policies, Nazareth Academy may not promise or offer athletic scholarships of any kind. Violations may result in loss of eligibility for the student, coach and/or school.

The school's teams have finished in the top four of the following IHSA sponsored state championship tournaments or meets.

- Baseball: State Champions (2021–22, 2022–23), 2nd place (2014–15), 3rd place (2011–12, 2017–18), 4th place (2010–11)
- Football: State Champions (2014–15, 2015–16, 2018–19, 2022–23, 2023–24, 2024–25), 2nd place (2017–18, 2019–20)
- Softball: 4th place (2016–17)
- Basketball (Girls): State Champions (2022–23, 2025–26), 2nd place (2017–18, 2021–22, 2023–24), 3rd place (2018–19)
- Golf (Boys): 4th place (2018–19)
- Volleyball (Girls): State Champions (2021–22), 2nd place (2022–23, 2025–26, 2026-27), 3rd place (2019–20)
- Soccer (Girls): 4th place (2024–25)

Jim Thome, former MLB player and a member of the Baseball Hall of Fame was an assistant coach for the Nazareth Academy baseball team during the high school career of his son, Landon.

== Alumni ==
- Virginia C. Bulat (class of 1956), author and historian, history of Illinois and Cook County, Illinois
- Jeannie Klisiewicz (class of 2004), The Ellen DeGeneres Show television producer
- Edward Majerczyk (class of 2005), cybercriminal involved in the 2014 celebrity nude photo leak, who pleaded guilty to illegally accessing more than 300 email accounts through a phishing scheme and was sentenced to nine months in federal prison in 2017
- Julian Love (class of 2016), NFL player for the New York Giants, Seattle Seahawks, Super Bowl LX Champion
- J. J. McCarthy (2017-2020), football quarterback for the University of Michigan and the New York Giants. He finished top 10 in the 2023 Heisman Trophy voting. He won the 2023-2024 FBS National Championship. Minnesota Vikings First Round draft pick, 10th overall in the 2024 NFL draft
- Tyler Morris (2018-2021), wide receiver for the University of Michigan He won the 2023-2024 FBS National Championship.
- CJ West (class of 2020), defensive lineman for Indiana University. San Francisco 49ers Fourth Round draft pick, 113th overall in the 2025 NFL draft
