= Rosary High School (Aurora, Illinois) =

Private girls school in Aurora, Illinois, US

Rosary College Prep (formerly Rosary High School)

Location
- 901 North Edgelawn Drive; Aurora, (Kane County), Illinois 60506; United States; 41°46′30″N 88°21′30″W

Information
- Type: Private, All-Female
- Motto: Veritas (Truth)
- Religious affiliations: Roman Catholic; Dominican Sisters
- Established: 1962
- School district: 129
- Authority: Dominican Sisters of Springfield. IL
- CEEB code: 140182
- Head of school: Ms. Amy McMahon
- Grades: 9–12
- Average class size: 17
- Classes offered: College Preparatory
- Colors: Royal Blue and White
- Slogan: Empower Achieve Succeed
- Athletics: 13 teams
- Athletics conference: Girls Catholic Athletic Conference
- Sports: Basketball, bowling, bass fishing, cheerleading, cross country, dance team, golf, lacrosse, soccer, softball, swimming and diving, tennis, track and field, volleyball
- Mascot: Royals
- Team name: Royals/Beads
- Accreditation: North Central Association of Colleges and Schools
- Newspaper: Veritas
- Yearbook: Exodus
- Tuition: $11,600 (2020–21)
- Athletic Director: John Rutter
- Director of Philanthropy & Alumnae: Vicki Danklefsen
- Director of Recruitment & Enrollment: Sara Caligiuri
- Director of Special Events & Volunteers: Becky Barr
- Website: www.rosaryhs.com

Rosary College Prep was established in 1962 by the Dominican Sisters of Springfield, Illinois, as a private, all-girls, college-preparatory, Roman Catholic, high school located in Aurora, Illinois. It is ranked as one of the top private schools in the state of Illinois as students achieve on average 5 points higher on the ACT and 43 points higher on the SAT. In addition, Rosary offers 22 various clubs and organizations and 13 sports teams. There is a very high participation rate where 82% of the student body plays in sports with an average GPA of 3.47. Because many of the sports teams reach sectional and state finals, 12 NCAA scholarships are awarded on average each year. Currently, one of Rosary's swimmers, Alexis Yager, has qualified for the Olympic Trials in 3 events. The Beads, Rosary's swim team, has won the Illinois state swim title 9 times (2006, 2007, 2008, 2009, 2015, 2016, 2017, 2023 and 2024). The Beads have also been runner-up for the title four times (2000, 2003, 2004 and 2014) and have placed third four times (1999, 2001, 2010 and 2011).

== Academics ==
Rosary provides a rigorous college preparatory curriculum that teaches to the individual student. Graduation requirements: Rosary High School requires that each graduate complete 4 credits each in English and Theology, 3 credits in Mathematics, Science, and Social Science, 2 credits of a foreign language, 1 credit of physical education, 0.5 credits of Health, and 3.5 credits of electives. In foreign languages, Rosary offers classes in Spanish, Latin, and French. It is also one of the only high schools in the state to have a dedicated Student Success Center where students on a daily basis receive individualized tutoring. This ensures that students at all levels are able to be successful and excel through all subjects.

As a college preparatory school, 100% of students attend college post-graduation. Rosary High School is an exceptional investment and value because students can earn up to 28 hours of college credit through dual-credit courses offered via Waubonsee Community College on Rosary's campus. This saves parents approximately over $200,000 in college tuition each semester. In addition, graduates earn approximately $16 million in scholarships for college each year.

Rosary High School maintains a relationship with Marmion Academy, its brother school. There are many joint activities and social clubs between the two schools, though mostly musical groups such as the theatre programs and the marching band.

Students are required to complete a total of 30 service hours per year.
