= List of high schools in Illinois =

This is a list of high schools in the U.S. state of Illinois.

== Adams County ==
- Central High School, Camp Point
- Liberty High School, Liberty
- Payson-Seymour High School, Payson
- Unity High School, Mendon

=== Quincy ===
- Quincy Notre Dame High School
- Quincy Senior High School

== Alexander County ==
- Cairo Junior/Senior High School, Cairo
- Egyptian Senior High School, Tamms

== Bond County ==
- Greenville High School, Greenville
- Mulberry Grove High School, Mulberry Grove

== Boone County ==
- North Boone High School, Poplar Grove

=== Belvidere ===
- Belvidere High School
- Belvidere North High School

== Brown County ==
- Brown County High School, Mount Sterling

== Bureau County ==
- Bureau Valley High School, Manlius
- DePue High School, DePue
- Hall High School, Spring Valley
- La Moille High School, La Moille
- Ohio High School, Ohio
- Princeton High School, Princeton

== Calhoun County ==
- Brussels High School, Brussels
- Calhoun High School, Hardin

== Carroll County ==
- Eastland High School, Lanark
- Milledgeville High School, Milledgeville
- West Carroll High School, Savanna

== Cass County ==
- A-C Central High School, Ashland
- Beardstown High School, Beardstown
- Virginia Senior High School, Virginia

== Champaign County ==
- Fisher Junior/Senior High School, Fisher
- Heritage High School, Broadlands
- Mahomet-Seymour High School, Mahomet
- Rantoul Township High School, Rantoul
- St. Joseph-Ogden High School, St. Joseph
- Unity High School, Tolono

=== Champaign ===
- Champaign Centennial High School
- Champaign Central High School
- Judah Christian School
- St. Thomas More High School

=== Urbana ===
- University Laboratory High School
- Urbana High School

== Christian County ==
- Edinburg High School, Edinburg
- Morrisonville High School, Morrisonville
- Pana Senior High School, Pana
- South Fork Jr/Sr High School (6–12), Kincaid
- Taylorville High School, Taylorville

== Clark County ==
- Casey-Westfield High School, Casey
- Marshall High School, Marshall
- Martinsville High School, Martinsville

== Clay County ==
- Clay City High School, Clay City
- Flora High School, Flora
- North Clay High School, Louisville

== Clinton County ==
- Carlyle High School, Carlyle
- Christ Our Rock Lutheran High School, Centralia
- Wesclin Senior High School, Trenton

=== Breese ===
- Central Community High School
- Mater Dei High School

== Coles County ==
- Charleston High School, Charleston
- Mattoon High School, Mattoon
- Oakland High School, Oakland

== Cook County ==
- Argo Community High School, Summit
- Bremen High School, Midlothian
- Buffalo Grove High School, Buffalo Grove
- Christian Heritage Academy, Northfield
- East Leyden High School, Franklin Park
- Dwight D. Eisenhower High School, Blue Island
- Elgin High School, Elgin
- Elk Grove High School, Elk Grove Village
- Elmwood Park High School, Elmwood Park
- Evergreen Park Community High School, Evergreen Park
- Glenbrook North High School, Northbrook
- Glenbrook South High School, Glenview
- Guerin College Preparatory High School, River Grove
- Hillcrest High School, Country Club Hills
- Homewood-Flossmoor High School, Flossmoor
- Lemont High School, Lemont
- Lyons Township High School, La Grange
- J. Sterling Morton High School District 201, a district in Cicero and Berwyn that competes athletically as "Morton High School", comprising the following campuses:
  - J. Sterling Morton High School East, Cicero
  - J. Sterling Morton Freshman Center, Cicero
  - J. Sterling Morton High School West, Berwyn
- Muslim Community Center Academy, Morton Grove
- Oak Forest High School, Oak Forest
- Oak Park and River Forest High School, Oak Park
- Prospect High School, Mount Prospect
- Proviso East High School, Maywood
- Proviso Mathematics and Science Academy, Forest Park
- Proviso West High School, Hillside
- Rich Central High School, Olympia Fields
- Rich East High School, Park Forest
- Ridgewood High School, Norridge
- Riverside Brookfield High School, Riverside
- Rochelle Zell Jewish High School, Deerfield
- Rolling Meadows High School, Rolling Meadows
- Carl Sandburg High School, Orland Park
- Schaumburg High School, Schaumburg
- Amos Alonzo Stagg High School, Palos Hills
- Streamwood High School, Streamwood
- Thornridge High School, Dolton
- Thornton Fractional North High School, Calumet City
- Thornton Township High School, Harvey
- Thornwood High School, South Holland
- Walther Christian Academy, Melrose Park
- West Leyden High School, Northlake
- Wheeling High School, Wheeling

=== Arlington Heights ===
- Christian Liberty Academy
- John Hersey High School
- Vanguard School

=== Bridgeview ===
- Aqsa School
- Universal School

=== Burbank ===
- Queen of Peace High School
- Reavis High School
- St. Laurence High School

=== Chicago Public Schools ===
- Al Raby School for Community and Environment
- Amundsen High School
- Austin Community Academy High School
- Bogan High School
- Bowen High School
- Bronzeville Scholastic Institute
- Carl Schurz High School
- Carver Military Academy
- Chicago High School for Agricultural Sciences
- Chicago High School for the Arts
- Chicago Math and Science Academy
- Chicago Military Academy
- Chicago Technology Academy
- Chicago Vocational High School
- Corliss High School
- Crane High School
- Curie Metropolitan High School
- Disney II Magnet School
- Dr. Pedro Albizu Campos High School
- Dunbar Vocational High School
- DuSable High School
- Dyett High School
- Farragut Career Academy
- Fenger Academy High School
- Foreman High School
- Frederick Douglass Academy High School
- Gage Park High School
- George Washington High School
- George Westinghouse College Prep
- Goode STEM Academy
- Gwendolyn Brooks College Preparatory Academy
- Harlan Community Academy High School
- Hirsch Metropolitan High School
- Hubbard High School
- Hyde Park Academy High School
- Infinity Math, Science & Technology High School
- John F. Kennedy High School
- John Hancock College Preparatory High School
- Jones College Prep High School
- Juarez Community Academy
- Julian High School
- Kelly High School
- Kelvyn Park High School
- Kenwood Academy
- King College Prep
- Lake View High School
- Lane Tech College Prep High School
- Lincoln Park High School
- Little Village Lawndale High School Campus
- Manley Career Academy High School
- Marshall Metropolitan High School
- Mather High School
- Michele Clark Magnet High School
- Morgan Park High School
- Noble Street College Prep
- North-Grand High School
- Northside College Preparatory High School
- Northside Learning Center High School
- Ogden International High School
- Orr Academy High School
- Phoenix Military Academy
- Prosser Career Academy
- Ray Graham Training Center
- Richards Career Academy
- Robert Lindblom Math & Science Academy
- Roberto Clemente Community Academy
- Roosevelt High School
- Senn High School
- Simeon Career Academy
- South Shore High School
- Steinmetz College Prep
- Sullivan High School
- Taft High School
- Tilden High School
- Uplift Community High School
- Vaughn Occupational High School
- Von Steuben Metropolitan High School
- Walter Payton College Prep
- Wells Community Academy High School
- Wendell Phillips Academy High School
- Whitney M. Young Magnet High School
- York Alternative High School

=== Chicago Independent Schools ===
- Air Force Academy High School
- Antonia Pantoja Charter School
- Back of the Yards College Preparatory High School
- British International School of Chicago Lincoln Park
- British International School of Chicago, South Loop
- Chicago Academy for the Arts
- Chicago Academy High School
- Chicago International Charter School Northtown Academy
- Chicago Waldorf School
- Collins Academy High School
- Devry Advantage Academy
- Francis W. Parker School
- Hales Franciscan High School
- John Hope College Preparatory High School
- Latin School of Chicago
- Latino Youth High School
- Lubavitch Girls High School
- Lubavitch Mesivta of Chicago
- Lycée Français de Chicago
- Morgan Park Academy
- Muhammad University of Islam
- North Lawndale College Prep High School
- Providence St. Mel School
- St. Benedict High School
- Southside Occupational Academy
- Telshe High School
- University of Chicago Laboratory Schools, Chicago
- Urban Prep Charter Academy for Young Men
- West Town Academy

=== Archdiocese of Chicago (Chicago/Cook County) ===
- Brother Rice High School
- Christ the King Jesuit College Prep High School
- Cristo Rey Jesuit High School
- De La Salle Institute
- DePaul College Prep
- Fenwick High School (Oak Park, Illinois)
- Holy Trinity High School
- Josephinum Academy
- Leo Catholic High School
- Loyola Academy, Willmette
- Marian Catholic High School, Chicago Heights
- Marist High School
- Mother McAuley Liberal Arts High School
- Mount Carmel High School
- Nazareth Academy (La Grange Park, Illinois)
- Our Lady of Tepeyac High School
- Regina Dominican High School, Willmette
- Resurrection High School
- St. Ignatius College Prep
- St. Patrick High School
- St. Rita of Cascia High School
- St. Francis de Sales High School
- St. Laurence High School, Burbank
- St. Viator High School, Arlington Heights
- Trinity High School (River Forest, Illinois)

=== Chicago Heights ===
- Bloom High School
- Bloom Trail High School

=== Des Plaines ===
- Maine West High School
- North Cook Young Adult Academy
- The Willows Academy

=== Evanston ===
- Beacon Academy
- Evanston Township High School
- Roycemore School

=== Hoffman Estates ===
- James B. Conant High School
- Hoffman Estates High School

=== Lansing ===
- Illiana Christian High School
- Thornton Fractional South High School

=== Niles ===
- Northridge Preparatory School
- Notre Dame College Prep

=== Oak Lawn ===
- Oak Lawn Community High School
- Harold L. Richards High School
- South Side Baptist School

=== Palatine ===
- William Fremd High School
- Palatine High School
- St. Thomas of Villanova Catholic School

=== Palos Heights ===
- Alan B. Shepard High School
- Chicago Christian High School

=== Park Ridge ===
- Maine East High School
- Maine South High School

=== Richton Park ===
- Rich South High School
- Southland College Preparatory Charter High School

=== Skokie ===
- Fasman Yeshiva High School
- Ida Crown Jewish Academy
- Niles North High School
- Niles West High School

=== Tinley Park ===
- Victor J. Andrew High School
- Tinley Park High School

=== Winnetka ===
- New Trier High School
- North Shore Country Day School

=== Defunct ===
- Academy of Our Lady (Chicago) (1875-1899)
- Archbishop Quigley Preparatory Seminary, Chicago (1918–2007)
- Arlington High School, Arlington Heights (1922–1984)
- Calumet High School (Chicago) (1919–2006)
- Chicago Discovery Academy, Chicago (closed 2013)
- Chicago High School, Chicago (1856–1880)
- Chicago Talent Development High School, Chicago (2009–2014)
- Cooley Vocational High School, Chicago (1958–1979)
- Englewood Technical Prep Academy, Chicago (1873–2008)
- Flower Career Academy, Chicago (1911–2003)
- Forest View High School, Arlington Heights (1962–1986)
- Holy Cross High School (River Grove, Illinois) (1961–2004)
- Immaculata High School (Chicago) (1921–1981)
- Immaculate Heart of Mary High School, Westchester (1960–2005)
- Las Casas Occupational High School, Chicago (closed 2011)
- Loretto Academy (Chicago) (1906-1972)
- Lourdes High School, Chicago
- Luther High School North, Chicago (1909-2017)
- Luther High School South, Chicago (closed 2014)
- Maine North High School, Des Plaines (1970–1981)
- Maria High School (Chicago, Illinois) (1911–2013)
- McKinley High School (Chicago) (1875–1954)
- Mendel Catholic High School, Chicago (1951–1988)
- Mount Assisi Academy, Lemont (1951-2014)
- Near North Career Metropolitan High School, Chicago (1977–2001)
- Niles East High School, Skokie (1938–1980)
- Northwest Suburban Academy, Arlington Heights (closed 2009)
- Notre Dame High School for Girls, Chicago (1938-2016)
- Quigley South, Chicago (1961–1990)
- Saint George High School (Evanston, Illinois) (1927–1969)
- Seton Academy (South Holland, Illinois) (1963-2016)
- St. Gregory the Great High School, Chicago (1937–2014)
- St. Joseph High School (Westchester, Illinois) (1960-2021)
- Saint Louise de Marillac High School, Northfield (1967–1994)
- St. Scholastica Academy (Chicago, Illinois) (1865–2012)
- Spalding High School (Chicago) (1908–2004)
- Weber High School (Chicago) (1890-1999)
- Young Women's Leadership Charter School of Chicago (1999-2019)

== Crawford County ==
- Hutsonville High School, Hutsonville
- Oblong High School, Oblong
- Palestine High School, Palestine
- Robinson High School, Robinson

== Cumberland County ==
- Cumberland High School, Toledo
- Neoga Junior-Senior High School, Neoga

== DeKalb County ==
- DeKalb High School, DeKalb
- Genoa-Kingston High School, Genoa
- Hiawatha Jr/Sr High School, Kirkland
- Hinckley-Big Rock High School, Hinckley
- Indian Creek High School, Shabbona
- Sandwich Community High School, Sandwich, also serves students in Kendall and LaSalle counties
- Somonauk High School, Somonauk, also serves students in LaSalle County
- Sycamore High School, Sycamore

== DeWitt County ==
- Blue Ridge High School, Farmer City
- Clinton High School, Clinton

== Douglas County ==
- Arcola High School, Arcola
- Arthur-Lovington-Atwood-Hammond High School, Arthur
- Tuscola Community High School, Tuscola
- Villa Grove High School, Villa Grove

== DuPage County ==
- Addison Trail High School, Addison
- Bartlett High School, Bartlett
- Fenton High School, Bensenville
- Glenbard North High School, Carol Stream
- Hinsdale Central High School, Hinsdale
- Hinsdale South High School, Darien
- Lake Park High School, Roselle
- Westmont High School, Westmont

=== Aurora ===
- Metea Valley High School
- Waubonsie Valley High School

=== Downers Grove ===
- Downers Grove North High School
- Downers Grove South High School

=== Elmhurst ===
- IC Catholic Prep
- Timothy Christian School
- York Community High School

=== Glen Ellyn ===
- Glenbard South High School
- Glenbard West High School

=== Lisle ===
- Benet Academy
- Lisle High School

=== Lombard ===
- College Preparatory School of America
- Glenbard East High School
- Montini Catholic High School

=== Naperville ===
- Naperville Central High School
- Naperville North High School

=== Villa Park ===
- Islamic Foundation School
- Willowbrook High School

=== Wheaton ===
- St. Francis High School
- Wheaton North High School
- Wheaton Warrenville South High School

=== West Chicago ===
- West Chicago Community High School
- Wheaton Academy

=== Defunct ===
- Driscoll Catholic High School, Addison (1966–2009)
- Indian Plains Alternative High School, Aurora (closed 2018)
- Midwest Military Academy, Wheaton (1931-1988)

== Edgar County ==
- Chrisman High School, Chrisman
- Kansas High School, Kansas
- Paris Cooperative High School, Paris
- Shiloh High School, Hume

== Edwards County ==
- Edwards County High School, Albion

== Effingham County ==
- Altamont High School, Altamont
- Beecher City Jr/Sr High School, Beecher City
- Dieterich Jr/Sr High School, Dieterich
- Teutopolis High School, Teutopolis

=== Effingham ===
- Effingham High School
- St. Anthony High School

== Fayette County ==
- Brownstown Jr/Sr High School, Brownstown
- Ramsey High School, Ramsey
- St. Elmo Jr/Sr High School, St. Elmo
- Vandalia Community High School, Vandalia

== Ford County ==
- Gibson City-Melvin-Sibley High School, Gibson City
- Paxton-Buckley-Loda High School, Paxton

== Franklin County ==
- Benton Consolidated High School, Benton
- Christopher High School, Christopher
- Frankfort Community High School, West Frankfort
- Sesser-Valier High School, Sesser
- Thompsonville High School, Thompsonville
- Zeigler-Royalton High School, Zeigler

== Fulton County ==
- Astoria High School, Astoria
- Avon High School, Avon
- Canton High School, Canton
- Cuba High School, Cuba
- Farmington Central High School, Farmington
- Lewistown High School, Lewistown
- Spoon River Valley High School, London Mills
- VIT High School, Table Grove

== Gallatin County ==
- Gallatin High School, Junction

== Greene County ==
- Carrollton High School, Carrollton
- Greenfield High School, Greenfield
- North Greene High School, White Hall

== Grundy County ==
- Coal City High School, Coal City
- Gardner-South Wilmington High School, Gardner
- Minooka High School, Minooka
- Morris Community High School, Morris

== Hamilton County ==
- Hamilton County Jr/Sr High School, McLeansboro

== Hancock County ==
- Hamilton High School, Hamilton
- Illini West High School, Carthage
- Southeastern High School, Augusta
- Warsaw High School, Warsaw

== Hardin County ==
- Hardin County High School, Elizabethtown

== Henderson County ==
- West Central High School, Biggsville

== Henry County ==
- AlWood High School, Woodhull
- Annawan High School, Annawan
- Cambridge High School, Cambridge
- Galva High School, Galva
- Geneseo High School, Geneseo
- Orion High School, Orion

=== Kewanee ===
- Kewanee High School
- Wethersfield High School

== Iroquois County ==
- Central High School, Clifton
- Christ Lutheran High School, Buckley
- Cissna Park High School, Cissna Park
- Donovan Jr/Sr High School, Donovan
- Iroquois West High School, Gilman
- Milford High School, Milford
- Watseka Community High School, Watseka

=== Defunct ===
- Crescent-Iroquois High School, Crescent City (1940–2009)

== Jackson County ==
- Elverado High School, Elkville
- Murphysboro High School, Murphysboro
- Trico High School, Campbell Hill

=== Carbondale ===
- Brehm Preparatory School
- Carbondale Community High School

== Jasper County ==
- Newton Community High School, Newton

== Jefferson County ==
- Mount Vernon Township High School, Mount Vernon
- Waltonville High School, Waltonville
- Webber High School, Bluford
- Woodlawn Community High School, Woodlawn

== Jersey County ==
- Jersey Community High School, Jerseyville

== Jo Daviess County ==
- East Dubuque High School, East Dubuque
- Galena High School, Galena
- River Ridge High School, Hanover
- Scales Mound High School, Scales Mound
- Stockton High School, Stockton
- Warren High School, Warren

== Johnson County ==
- Goreville High School, Goreville
- Vienna High School, Vienna

== Kane County ==
- Batavia High School, Batavia
- Central High School, Burlington
- Dundee-Crown High School, Carpentersville
- Geneva Community High School, Geneva
- Hampshire High School, Hampshire
- Kaneland High School, Maple Park
- South Elgin High School, South Elgin

=== Aurora ===
- Aurora Central Catholic High School
- Aurora Christian Schools
- East Aurora High School
- Illinois Mathematics and Science Academy
- Marmion Academy
- Rosary High School
- West Aurora High School

=== Elgin ===
- The Einstein Academy
- Elgin Academy
- Harvest Christian Academy
- Larkin High School
- St. Edward Central Catholic High School
- Westminster Christian School

=== St. Charles ===
- St. Charles East High School
- St. Charles North High School

=== Defunct ===
- Academy of the Cross, St. Charles (never opened, property sold in 2015)
- Broadview Academy, La Fox (1909–May 2007)

== Kankakee County ==
- Bradley-Bourbonnais Community High School, Bradley
- Grant Park High School, Grant Park
- Herscher High School, Herscher
- Manteno High School, Manteno
- Momence High School, Momence
- St. Anne Community High School, St. Anne

=== Kankakee ===
- Bishop McNamara High School
- Grace Christian Academy
- Kankakee High School
- Kankakee Trinity Academy

== Kendall County ==
- Newark Community High School, Newark
- Plainfield South High School, Joliet
- Plano High School, Plano
- Yorkville High School, Yorkville

=== Oswego ===
- Oswego East High School
- Oswego High School

== Knox County ==
- Abingdon-Avon High School, Abingdon
- Galesburg High School, Galesburg
- Knoxville High School, Knoxville
- ROWVA High School, Oneida
- Williamsfield High School, Williamsfield

== LaSalle County ==
- Earlville High School, Earlville
- LaSalle-Peru High School, LaSalle
- Leland High School, Leland
- Mendota Township High School, Mendota
- St. Bede Academy, Peru
- Seneca High School, Seneca
- Serena High School, Serena
- Streator Township High School, Streator

=== Ottawa ===
- Marquette Academy
- Ottawa Township High School

== Lake County ==
- Antioch Community High School, Antioch
- Barrington High School, Barrington
- Deerfield High School, Deerfield
- Grant Community High School, Fox Lake
- Highland Park High School, Highland Park
- Lake Zurich High School, Lake Zurich
- Lakes Community High School, Lake Villa
- Cyd Lash Academy, Gages Lake
- Libertyville High School, Libertyville
- North Chicago Community High School, North Chicago
- Round Lake High School, Round Lake
- Adlai E. Stevenson High School, Lincolnshire
- Vernon Hills High School, Vernon Hills
- Warren Township High School, Gurnee
- Wauconda High School, Wauconda

=== Grayslake ===
- Grayslake Central High School
- Grayslake North High School

=== Lake Forest ===
- Lake Forest Academy
- Lake Forest High School
- Woodlands Academy of the Sacred Heart

=== Mundelein ===
- Carmel High School
- Mundelein High School

=== Waukegan ===
- Cristo Rey St. Martin College Prep
- Waukegan High School

=== Zion ===
- New Tech High at Zion-Benton East
- Zion-Benton Township High School

=== Defunct ===
- Ferry Hall School, Lake Forest (1869–1974)

== Lawrence County ==
- Lawrenceville High School, Lawrenceville
- Red Hill High School, Bridgeport

== Lee County ==
- Amboy High School, Amboy
- Ashton-Franklin Center High School, Ashton
- Dixon High School, Dixon
- Paw Paw High School, Paw Paw

== Livingston County ==
- Dwight High School, Dwight
- Flanagan-Cornell High School, Flanagan
- Pontiac Township High School, Pontiac
- Prairie Central High School, Fairbury
- Tri-Point High School, Cullom
- Woodland High School, Streator, also serves students in LaSalle County

== Logan County ==
- Lincoln Community High School, Lincoln
- Hartsburg-Embden Jr/Sr High School, Hartsburg
- Mount Pulaski High School, Mount Pulaski

== Macon County ==
- Argenta-Oreana High School, Argenta
- Decatur Christian School] Forsyth
- Maroa-Forsyth High School, Maroa
- Meridian High School, Macon
- Mount Zion High School, Mount Zion
- Sangamon Valley High School, Niantic
- Warrensburg-Latham High School, Warrensburg

=== Decatur ===
- Eisenhower High School
- Lutheran School Association Decatur
- MacArthur High School
- St. Teresa High School

=== Defunct ===
- Stephen Decatur High School, Decatur (1911–2000)

== Macoupin County ==
- Bunker Hill High School, Bunker Hill
- Carlinville High School, Carlinville
- Gillespie High School, Gillespie
- Mount Olive High School, Mount Olive
- North Mac High School, Virden
- Southwestern High School, Piasa
- Staunton High School, Staunton

== Madison County ==
- Civic Memorial High School, Bethalto
- Collinsville High School, Collinsville
- East Alton-Wood River High School, Wood River
- Father McGivney Catholic High School, Maryville
- Granite City High School, Granite City
- Highland High School, Highland
- Madison Senior High School, Madison
- Roxana High School, Roxana
- Triad High School, Troy

=== Alton ===
- Alton Senior High School
- Marquette Catholic High School

=== Edwardsville ===
- Edwardsville High School
- Metro-East Lutheran High School

=== Defunct ===
- Livingston High School, Livingston (Late 1800s–2004)
- Venice High School, Venice (1917–2004)

== Marion County ==
- Centralia High School, Centralia
- Odin High School, Odin
- Patoka Senior High School, Patoka
- Salem Community High School, Salem
- Sandoval Junior-Senior High School, Sandoval
- South Central High School, Farina

== Marshall County ==
- Henry-Senachwine High School, Henry
- Midland High School, Varna

== Mason County ==
- Havana High School, Havana
- Illini Central High School, Mason City
- Midwest Central High School, Manito

== Massac County ==
- Joppa-Maple Grove High School, Joppa
- Massac County High School, Metropolis

== McDonough County ==
- Bushnell-Prairie City High School, Bushnell
- Macomb High School, Macomb
- West Prairie High School, Sciota

== McHenry County ==
- Alden-Hebron High School, Hebron
- Cary-Grove High School, Cary
- Harvard High School, Harvard
- Huntley High School, Huntley
- Jacobs High School, Algonquin
- Johnsburg High School, Johnsburg
- Marengo Community High School, Marengo
- McHenry High School, McHenry
- Richmond-Burton Community High School, Richmond

=== Crystal Lake ===
- Crystal Lake Central High School
- Crystal Lake South High School
- Prairie Ridge High School

=== Woodstock ===
- Marian Central Catholic High School
- Woodstock High School
- Woodstock North High School

== McLean County ==
- El Paso-Gridley High School, Gridley
- Heyworth High School, Heyworth
- LeRoy High School, Le Roy
- Lexington High School, Lexington
- Olympia High School, Stanford
- Ridgeview High School, Colfax
- Tri-Valley High School, Downs

=== Bloomington ===
- Bloomington High School
- Central Catholic High School
- Cornerstone Christian Academy
- Regional Alternative School

=== Normal ===
- Calvary Christian Academy
- Normal Community High School
- Normal Community West High School
- University High School

== Menard County ==
- Athens Senior High School, Athens
- Greenview High School, Greenview
- Porta High School, Petersburg

== Mercer County ==
- Mercer County High School, Aledo

== Monroe County ==
- Columbia High School, Columbia
- Valmeyer High School, Valmeyer

=== Waterloo ===
- Gibault Catholic High School
- Waterloo High School

== Montgomery County ==
- Hillsboro High School, Hillsboro
- Lincolnwood High School, Raymond
- Litchfield High School, Litchfield
- Nokomis High School, Nokomis

== Morgan County ==
- Franklin Junior/Senior High School, Franklin
- Meredosia-Chambersburg High School, Meredosia
- Triopia Jr/Sr High School, Concord
- Waverly High School, Waverly

=== Jacksonville ===
- Illinois School for the Deaf (ISD)
- Illinois School for the Visually Impaired (ISVI)
- Jacksonville High School
- Routt Catholic High School

== Moultrie County ==
- Arthur Christian School, Arthur
- Okaw Valley High School, Bethany
- Sullivan High School, Sullivan

== Ogle County ==
- Byron High School, Byron
- Forreston High School, Forreston
- Oregon High School, Oregon
- Polo Community High School, Polo
- Rochelle Township High School, Rochelle
- Stillman Valley High School, Stillman Valley

== Peoria County ==
- Brimfield High School, Brimfield
- Dunlap High School, Dunlap
- Elmwood High School, Elmwood
- Illini Bluffs High School, Glasford
- Illinois Valley Central High School, Chillicothe
- Limestone Community High School, Bartonville
- Peoria Heights High School, Peoria Heights
- Princeville High School, Princeville

=== Peoria ===
- Manual High School
- Peoria Christian School
- Peoria High School (Central)
- Peoria Notre Dame High School
- Richwoods High School
- Woodruff Career and Technical Center

=== Defunct ===
- Academy of Our Lady/Spalding Institute, Peoria (1863–1988)
- Bergan High School, Peoria (1964–1988)

== Perry County ==
- DuQuoin High School, Du Quoin
- Pinckneyville Community High School, Pinckneyville

== Piatt County ==
- Bement High School, Bement
- Cerro Gordo High School, Cerro Gordo
- DeLand-Weldon High School, De Land
- Monticello High School, Monticello

== Pike County ==
- Griggsville-Perry High School, Griggsville
- Pittsfield High School, Pittsfield
- Pleasant Hill High School, Pleasant Hill
- Western High School, Barry

== Pope County ==
- Pope County High School, Golconda

== Pulaski County ==
- Century High School, Ullin
- Meridian High School, Mounds

== Putnam County ==
- Putnam County High School, Granville

== Randolph County ==
- Chester High School, Chester
- Coulterville High School, Coulterville
- Red Bud High School, Red Bud
- Sparta High School, Sparta
- Steeleville High School, Steeleville

== Richland County ==
- Richland County High School, Olney

== Rock Island County ==
- Alleman High School, Rock Island
- Moline High School, Moline
- Riverdale High School, Port Byron
- Rock Island High School, Rock Island
- Rockridge High School, Taylor Ridge
- Sherrard High School, Sherrard (also serves students in Mercer County)
- United Township High School, East Moline

== St. Clair County ==
- Berean Christian School, Fairview Heights
- Cahokia High School, Cahokia Heights
- Collinsville High School, Collinsville
- Dupo High School, Dupo
- Freeburg Community High School, Freeburg
- Lebanon High School, Lebanon
- Marissa Jr/Sr High School, Marissa
- Mascoutah Community High School, Mascoutah
- New Athens High School, New Athens
- O'Fallon Township High School, O'Fallon

=== Belleville ===
- Althoff Catholic High School
- Belleville High School-East
- Belleville High School-West

=== East St. Louis ===
- East St. Louis Senior High School
- SIUE East St. Louis Charter High School

== Saline County ==
- Carrier Mills-Stonefort High School, Carrier Mills
- Eldorado High School, Eldorado
- Galatia High School, Galatia
- Harrisburg High School, Harrisburg

== Sangamon County ==
- Auburn High School, Auburn
- Glenwood High School, Chatham
- New Berlin High School, New Berlin
- Pawnee High School, Pawnee
- Pleasant Plains High School, Pleasant Plains
- Riverton High School, Riverton
- Rochester High School, Rochester
- Tri-City High School, Buffalo
- Williamsville High School, Williamsville

=== Springfield ===
- Calvary Academy
- Douglas/Prep High School
- Lanphier High School
- Lutheran High School
- Sacred Heart-Griffin High School
- Springfield High School
- Springfield Southeast High School

=== Defunct ===
- Divernon High School, Divernon (c. 1900–2007)
- Ursuline Academy, Springfield (1857–2007)

== Schuyler County ==
- Rushville-Industry High School, Rushville

== Scott County ==
- Bluffs High School, Bluffs
- Winchester High School, Winchester

== Shelby County ==
- Central A&M High School, Moweaqua
- Cowden-Herrick High School, Cowden
- Shelbyville High School, Shelbyville
- Stewardson-Strasburg High School, Strasburg
- Windsor Jr/Sr High School, Windsor

== Stark County ==
- Stark County High School, Toulon

== Stephenson County ==
- Dakota Junior Senior High School, Dakota
- Lena-Winslow High School, Lena
- Orangeville High School, Orangeville
- Pearl City High School, Pearl City

=== Freeport ===
- Aquin Central Catholic High School
- Freeport High School

== Tazewell County ==
- Deer Creek-Mackinaw High School, Mackinaw
- Delavan High School, Delavan
- East Peoria Community High School, East Peoria
- Morton High School, Morton
- Pekin Community High School, Pekin
- Tremont High School, Tremont
- Washington Community High School, Washington

== Union County ==
- Anna-Jonesboro Community High School, Anna
- Cobden High School, Cobden
- Dongola High School, Dongola
- Shawnee High School, Wolf Lake

== Vermilion County ==
- Armstrong Township High School, Armstrong
- Bismarck Henning High School, Bismarck
- Georgetown-Ridge Farm High School, Georgetown
- Hoopeston Area High School, Hoopeston
- Oakwood High School, Fithian
- Salt Fork High School, Catlin
- Westville High School, Westville

=== Danville ===
- Danville High School
- First Baptist Christian School
- Schlarman Academy

=== Defunct ===
- Henning High School, Henning (1914–1964)
- Catlin High School, Catlin
- Jamaica High School, Sidell
- Rossville-Alvin High School, Rossville

== Wabash County ==
- Mount Carmel High School, Mount Carmel

== Warren County ==
- Monmouth-Roseville High School, Monmouth
- United Senior High School, Monmouth

== Washington County ==
- Nashville Community High School, Nashville
- Okawville High School, Okawville

== Wayne County ==
- Fairfield Community High School, Fairfield
- Wayne City High School, Wayne City

== White County ==
- Carmi-White County High School, Carmi
- Grayville Jr/Sr High School, Grayville
- Norris City-Omaha-Enfield High School, Norris City

== Whiteside County ==
- Erie High School, Erie
- Fulton High School, Fulton
- Morrison High School, Morrison
- Newman Central Catholic High School, Sterling
- Prophetstown High School, Prophetstown
- Rock Falls High School, Rock Falls
- Sterling High School, Sterling
- Unity Christian High School, Fulton

== Will County ==
- Beecher High School, Beecher
- Bolingbrook High School
- Furqaan Academy, Bolingbrook
- Lincoln-Way East High School, Frankfort
- Lockport Township High School, Lockport
- Neuqua Valley High School, Naperville
- Peotone High School, Peotone
- Reed-Custer High School, Braidwood
- Romeoville High School, Romeoville
- Wilmington High School, Wilmington

=== Crete ===
- Crete-Monee High School
- Illinois Lutheran High School

=== Joliet ===
- Joliet Catholic Academy
- Joliet Central High School
- Joliet West High School

=== New Lenox ===
- Lincoln-Way Central High School
- Lincoln-Way West High School
- Providence Catholic High School

=== Plainfield ===
- Plainfield Central High School
- Plainfield East High School
- Plainfield North High School
- Plainfield South High School

=== Defunct ===
- Christ Lutheran Academy (Plainfield, Illinois) (2001-2010)
- Lincoln-Way North High School, Frankfort (Closed in 2016)

== Williamson County ==
- Carterville High School, Carterville
- Herrin High School, Herrin

=== Johnston City ===
- Project E.C.H.O. Alternative School
- Johnston City High School

=== Marion ===
- Crab Orchard High School
- Marion High School

== Winnebago County ==
- Durand High School, Durand
- Harlem High School, Machesney Park
- Hononegah Community High School, Rockton
- Pecatonica High School, Pecatonica
- South Beloit High School, South Beloit
- Winnebago High School, Winnebago

=== Rockford ===
- Auburn High School
- Boylan Catholic High School
- Christian Life Schools
- Guilford High School
- Thomas Jefferson High School
- Keith Country Day School
- Our Lady of the Sacred Heart Academy
- Rockford Christian Schools
- Rockford East High School
- Rockford Lutheran High School

=== Defunct ===
- Rockford Central High School, Rockford (1885–1940)
- St. Thomas Catholic High School for Boys, Rockford (1929-1963)

== Woodford County ==
- El Paso-Gridley High School, El Paso
- Eureka High School, Eureka
- Fieldcrest High School, Minonk
- Lowpoint-Washburn High School, Washburn
- Metamora Township High School, Metamora
- Roanoke-Benson High School, Roanoke

== See also ==
- List of high schools in Greater St. Louis
- List of school districts in Illinois
