= Lincoln Trail Conference =

- Conference: IHSA
- No. of teams: 12
- Region: Central Illinois (Bureau, Henderson, Henry, Knox, Mercer, Peoria, Rock Island, Stark, and Warren counties)

Locations
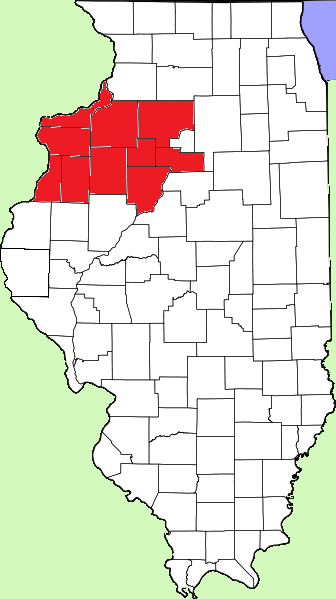
- The Lincoln Trail Conference within Illinois

The Lincoln Trail Conference is a high school conference in western central Illinois. The conference participates in athletics and activities in the Illinois High School Association (IHSA). The conference comprises public high schools with small enrollments in portions of Bureau, Henderson, Henry, Knox, Mercer, Peoria, Rock Island, Stark, and Warren counties.

== Current membership ==
School	Location	Mascot	Colors	Enrollment	IHSA Classes 2/3/4	IHSA Music Class	IHSA Football Class	IHSA Cheerleading Class
Abingdon-Avon High School	Abingdon, IL	Tornadoes		263			1A	
AlWood High School	Woodhull, IL	Aces		116	A/1A/1A	D	1A	Small squad
Annawan High School	Annawan, IL	Braves		120	A/1A/1A	D	2A	Small squad
Cambridge High School	Cambridge, IL	Vikings		146	A/1A/1A	D	1A	Small squad
Galva High School	Galva, IL	Wildcats		179	A/1A/1A	D	3A	Small Squad
Knoxville High School	Knoxville, IL	Blue Bullets		358		C	2A	
Mercer County High School	Aledo, IL	Golden Eagles		395	A/1A/2A	B	3A	Small squad
Princeville High School	Princeville, IL	Princes		242	A/1A/1A	C	1A	Small squad
ROWVA High School	Oneida, IL	Tigers		191	A/1A/1A	C	1A (Williamsfield Coop)	Small squad
Stark County High School	Toulon, IL	Rebels		271	A/1A/1A	C	1A	Small squad
United Senior High School	Monmouth, IL	Red Storm		321	A/1A/1A	C	2A	Small squad
Wethersfield High School	Kewanee, IL	Flying Geese		189	A/1A/1A	C	2A	Small squad
Williamsfield High School	Williamsfield, IL	Bombers		79	A/1A/1A	C	1A (ROWVA Coop)	

Sources:IHSA Conferences and IHSA Member Schools Directory

== History ==
The Lincoln Trail Conference (LTC) was established in 1976. The eight charter members included Cambridge, Winola, and Alwood from the Corn Belt Conference; Alexis, Galva and ROVA from the Little 6 Conference; and Wethersfield and Toulon-LaFayette from the Blackhawk Conference.

Wethersfield played an independent schedule that first season and its first full conference slate wasn't until 1977. In 1988 Viola-Winola closed and Joy-Westmer replaced them in 1989. In 1992 Toulon consolidated with Wyoming and became known as Stark County. Alexis left briefly in 1993 and Annawan and Princeville joined in 1995. In 1998 Alexis was back in along with newcomers Biggsville Union and Monmouth Warren. The league divided into two divisions with Cambridge, Galva, Wethersfield, ROWVA, Princeville and Stark County in the East, and Alexis, Annawan, Biggsville, Westmer, Warren and Alwood in the West. In 2004 Alexis and Monmouth Warren consolidated forming Alexis United, and Biggsville Union left the loop to coop with Stronghurst Southern and the division set up was dropped. In 2005 Oneida ROWVA and Woodhull-Alwood co-oped in football and Biggsville Union rejoined under the name of West Central having consolidated with Stronghurst Southern. Football was not a conference sport from 2006–2009. During that time the Lincoln Trail Conference was a component of the West Prairie Trail mega conference for football only. The components of the West Prairie Trail conference were the West Central Conference, Prairieland Conference and Lincoln Trail Conference. The Lincoln Trail may reform as a football conference moving forward with the following teams: Annawan/Wethersfield co-op, Cambridge/AlWood co-op, Galva/Williamsfield co-op, Mercer County, Stark County, Princeville, Sciota West Prairie, West Central, and the River Valley co-op (Henry, Low Point-Washburn, Midland) which is not a member for other sports.

Prior to the advent of the Lincoln Trail Conference, the schools of the present day conference are known to have participated in several other conferences. During the life of the conference many changes have occurred, the following table and timeline summarize major events:

School	Years	Consolidations	Conference Came From	Conference Went To
Aledo High School	2006–2009	Aledo+Westmer=Mercer County (2009)	Olympic (2006)	Mercer County remained in LTC (2009)
Alexis High School	1976–1993; 1998–2004	Alexis+Warren=United (2004)	Little 6 (1976); Bi County(1998)	Bi County (1993); United remained in LTC (2004)
AlWood High School	1976–Present	Alpha+Woodhull=AlWood (1948)	Corn Belt (1976)	
Annawan High School	1995–Present		Indian Valley (1995)	
Cambridge High School	1976–Present		Corn Belt (1976)	
Galva High School	1976–Present		Little 6 (1976)	
Mercer County High School	2009–Present	Aledo+Westmer=Mercer County (2009)	Consolidation of 2 LTC members (2009)	
Princeville High School	1995–Present		Indian Valley (1995)	
River Valley Coop	Football only 2010–2012	Henry+Low Point-Washburn+Midland=River Valley Coop	Big Rivers	
ROVA High School	1976–1987	Rio+Oneida+Victoria+Altona=ROVA (1948); ROVA+Galesburg (Wataga students)=ROWVA (1987)	Little 6 (1976)	ROWVA remained in LTC (1987)
ROWVA High School	1987–Present	ROVA+Galesburg (Wataga students)=ROWVA (1987)	Consolidation of LTC member and some Western Big 6 member students (1987)	
Stark County High School	1992–Present	Toulon-LaFayette+Wyoming=Stark County (1992)	Consolidation of LTC member and Indian Valley member (1992)	
Toulon-LaFayette High School	1976–1992	Toulon Township+LaFayette=Toulon-LaFayette (1970); Toulon-LaFayette+Wyoming=Stark County (1992)	Blackhawk & Inter County Athletic Conference (1976)	Stark County remained in LTC (1992)
Union High School (Biggsville)	1998–2004	Biggsville+Gladstone-Qquawka=Union (1960); Union+Stronghurst Southern=West Central (2005)	Bi County (1998)	West Central (2004)
United High School	2004–Present	Alexis+Warren=United (2004); added Yorkwood (2007)	Consolidation of 2 LTC members (2004); added Prairieland member (2007)	
Warren High School (Monmouth)	1998–2004	Alexis+Warren=United (2004)	Bi County (1998)	United remained in LTC (2004)
Westmer High School	1989–2009	Joy+Keithsburg+New Boston=Westmer (1960); Aledo+Westmer= Mercer County (2009)	Olympic 1976–1987; Unknown 1987–1989	Mercer County remained in LTC (2009)
Wethersfield High School	1976–Present		Blackhawk (1976)	
West Central High School	2005–Present	Union+Stronghurst Southern=West Central (2005)	Consolidation of 2 West Central members (2005)	
West Prairie High School (Sciota)	2010–2014			
Winola High School	1976–1988	New Windsor+Viola=Winola (19??); Winola into Sherrard (1988)	Corn Belt (1976)	Olympic (1988)

=== Timeline ===
- 1976 – Lincoln Trial Conference forms with initial members Alexis, AlWood, Cambridge, Galva, ROVA, Toulon-LaFayette, Wethersfield, and Winola
- 1987 – ROVA consolidates with Wataga students attending Galesburg to become ROWVA
- 1988 – Winola leaves
- 1989 – Westmer joins
- 1992 – Toulon-LaFayette consolidates with Wyoming to become Stark County
- 1993 – Alexis leaves
- 1995 – Annawan and Princeville join
- 1997 – Divisional east and west format adopted for boys football
- 1998 – Alexis returns, Union joins, and Warren joins
- 2004 – Union leaves, Alexis consolidates with Warren to become United, divisional format dropped for boys football
- 2005 – West Central joins
- 2006 – Aledo joins and boys football leaves to participate in the West Prairie Trail mega conference
- 2007 – Yorkwood consolidates into United
- 2009 – Aledo and Westmer consolidate to become Mercer County
- 2010 – Boys football returns
- 2021- Abingdon-Avon and Knoxville join from Prairieland Conference

== Membership timeline ==
Full members Full members (non-football) Partial member (listed sports) Full members (8-man football) Full members (Football Coop) Other Conference

== Competitive success ==
The Lincoln Trail Conference has won 3 team state championships and 1 individual championship in IHSA sponsored athletics and activities. Through the 2008–2009 season the conference has won Illinois state titles in:

- Boys Football (Wethersfield 2001–2002; United 2004–2005; Mercer County 2012–2013)
- Girls Track and Field (West Central High School Theresa Brokaw Class A 1600 meter run 2006)

Prior to the advent of the Lincoln Trail Conference, or before joining the conference several member schools won Illinois state championships, including:

- Boys Football (Aledo in the Olympic Conference 1998–1999, 2000–2001, 2002–2003)
- Boys Golf (Aledo in the Olympic Conference 1984–1985)
- Boys Track & Field (Bigssville 1898–1899, 1899–1900)

== Cooperative arrangements ==
Due to the small enrollment, several Lincoln Trail Conference schools form cooperative arrangements. The current arrangements are shown below.

Boys Baseball

- AlWood and Cambridge
- Annawan and Wethersfield
- ROWVA and Williamsfield

Boys Basketball

- AlWood and Cambridge
- ROWVA and Williamsfield

Girls Basketball

- AlWood and Cambridge
- ROWVA and Williamsfield

Boys Cross Country

- AlWood and Cambridge
- Annawan and Wethersfield
- ROWVA and Williamsfield

Girls Cross Country

- AlWood and Cambridge
- Annawan and Wethersfield
- ROWVA and Williamsfield

Boys Football

- AlWood and Cambridge
- Annawan and Wethersfield
- ROWVA and Williamsfield

Girls Volleyball

- AlWood and Cambridge
- ROWVA and Williamsfield

Boys Golf

- AlWood and Cambridge
- Annawan and Wethersfield
- ROWVA and Williamsfield

Girls Golf

- AlWood and Cambridge
- Annawan and Wethersfield
- ROWVA and Williamsfield

Boys Track and Field

- AlWood and Cambridge
- Annawan and Wethersfield
- ROWVA and Williamsfield

Girls Track and Field

- AlWood and Cambridge
- Annawan and Wethersfield
- ROWVA and Williamsfield

Girls Softball

- AlWood and Cambridge
- Annawan and Wethersfield
- ROWVA and Williamsfield
