= Olympic Conference (Illinois) =

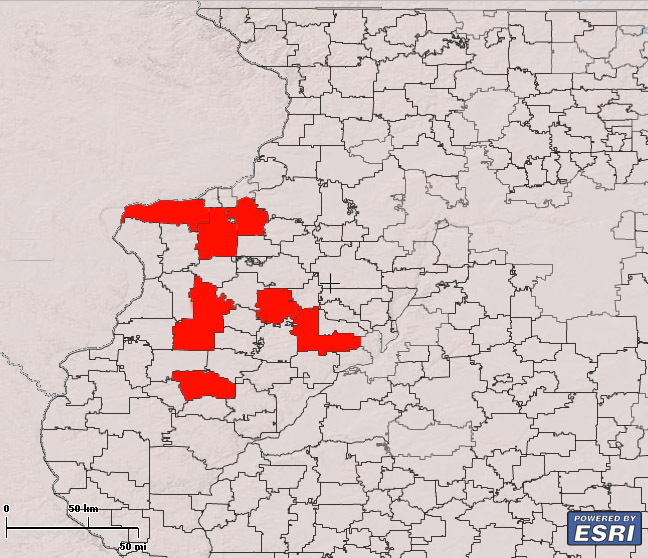
Olympic Conference within Illinois

The Olympic Conference was a high school conference in northwest Illinois in existence from 1976 to 2010. The conference participated in athletics and activities in the Illinois High School Association. The conference comprised high schools with enrollments between 300 and 600 students on the fringe of the Illinois Quad Cities, Peoria, Galesburg, and in and around the cities of Macomb and Monmouth.

== Final membership ==
| School | Location | Mascot | Colors | Enrollment | IHSA Classes 2/3/4 | IHSA Music Class | IHSA Football Class | IHSA Cheerleading Class |
|---|---|---|---|---|---|---|---|---|
| Farmington Central High School | Farmington, IL | Farmers | | 438 | A/1A/2A | B | 2A | Small squad |
| Macomb High School | Macomb, IL | Bombers | | 587 | A/1A/2A | B | 3A | Small squad |
| Monmouth-Roseville High School | Monmouth, IL | Titans | | 531 | A/1A/2A | B | 3A | Small squad |
| Orion High School | Orion, IL | Chargers | | 346 | A/1A/1A | C | 2A | Small Squad |
| Rockridge High School | Taylor Ridge, IL | Rockets | | 444 | A/1A/2A | B | 2A | Small squad |
| Sherrard High School | Sherrard, IL | Tigers | | 534 | A/1A/2A | B | 3A | Small squad |

Sources:IHSA Conferences and IHSA Member Schools Directory

== History ==
The original Olympic Conference formed in the fall of 1948. The six charter members were Astoria, Bushnell, Cuba, Lewistown, Spoon River Valley, and Table Grove VIT. The conference got its name because, like the Olympics held that year, the member schools would be competing in many different events. The first football competition was held in 1948, but to be eligible for the championship schools had to play at least 3 other member schools. In 1953 Industry was added, bringing the total to seven member schools. The 1958–1959 academic year was the league's final season. The Olympic conference name was resurrected in 1976 with completely different schools.

The present day Olympic Conference formed in the fall of 1976. The eight charter members included Abingdon, Aledo, and Knoxville from the Little 6 Conference; Joy-Westmer, Orion, Sherrard, and Taylor Ridge-Rockridge from the Corn Belt Conference; and Monmouth from the Illio Conference. After the 1981–1982 season Abingdon and Knoxville left to help form the Prairieland Conference, bringing the total to 6 schools. After the 1986–1987 season Joy-Westmer dropped out and Macomb took their place in the fall of 1987. In the fall of 1988 Sherrard consolidated with Winola (New Windsor-Viola), but retained the name Sherrard. In the fall of 1992 Farmington joined and Knoxville rejoined the Olympic, again giving the league an 8 team alignment.

The 2000-2010 decade brought several changes to the Olympic Conference. Monmouth consolidated with Roseville in the fall of 2005 to become Monmouth-Roseville. Aledo left the Conference after the 2005–2006 academic year to join the Lincoln Trail conference and West Prairie Trail mega conference for football. Knoxville left after the 2008–2009 academic year, and Farmington departed after the 2009–2010 season, both to rejoin the Prairieland conference. The loss of three conference schools in a short period of time put the remaining schools in the awkward position of facing a 5 school conference in 2010. The Conference had experienced a similar dilemma in 1987 with the loss of Westmer. However, at that time, Macomb High School filled the void.

In 2009, the Olympic Conference explored options of Kewanee High School joining the Olympic, Mercer County High School (formerly Aledo and Westmer High Schools) rejoining the Olympic, joining or merging with the Three Rivers Conference (north of the Olympic), and joining or merging with the Lincoln Trail Conference (east and south of the Olympic). A solution was reached when as offer was extended from the West Central Conference (distant south of the Olympic) to the five Olympic Conference schools that remained in 2010.

Due to the geographic range of the newly aligned West Central Conference, it was split into north and south divisions for most activities, with the five remaining Olympic Conference schools and Illini West High School (Carthage) comprising the north division. Mercer County High School considered joining the West Central Conference beginning in 2011. This would have put many of the original Olympic Conference members back together, albeit under a new name, but it has not occurred to date.

| School | Years | Consolidations | Conference Came From | Conference Went To |
|---|---|---|---|---|
| Abingdon High School | 1976–1982 | n/a | Little 6 | Prairieland |
| Aledo High School | 1976–2006 | 2009 with Westmer | Little 6 | Lincoln Trail |
| Farmington Central High School | 1992–2010 | n/a | Prairieland | Prairieland |
| Knoxville High School | 1976–1982; 1992–2009 | n/a | Little 6; Prairieland | Prairieland; Prairieland |
| Macomb High School | 1987–2010 | n/a | Great Midwestern | West Central |
| Monmouth-Roseville High School | 1976–2010 | 2005 with Roseville | Illio | West Central |
| Orion High School | 1976–2010 | n/a | Corn Belt | West Central |
| Rockridge High School | 1976–2010 | n/a | Corn Belt | West Central |
| Sherrard High School | 1976–2010 | 1988 with Winola | Corn Belt | West Central |
| Westmer High School | 1976–1987 | 2009 with Aledo | Corn Belt | Lincoln Trail |

== Competitive success ==
The present day Olympic Conference won 23 state championships in IHSA sponsored athletics and activities. At the conclusion of the 2009–2010 season the conference won Illinois state titles in Boys Golf (9), Boys Football (5), Chess (3), Boys Wrestling (2), Girls Bowling (1), Girls Softball (1), Girls Track (1), and Scholastic Bowl (1).

Success may also be measured by the number of regional titles won by conference schools. For athletics and activities and activities without regionals, or where a team may still advance to state without winning the regional (or sectional), state qualifications or placing in the top 10 are roughly equivalent, as all mean the school is among the top schools (10–64) in the state within that division. In events where district titles were replaced by regionals, the data is summed. Only sectional titles are available for track. Only top 10 finishers are available for music. Based on these criteria, the most successful athletics and activities in the present day Olympic Conference through the 2008-2009 winter season are:

- Boys Football: 83 state qualifications. Olympic conference teams qualify for state in Boys Football at a combined rate of 34%.
- Boys Basketball: 64 regional championships. Olympic conference teams win their regional in Boys Basketball at combined rate of 26%.
- Girls Volleyball: 50 regional championships. Olympic conference teams win their regional in Girls Volleyball at a combined rate of 20%.

The most successful schools in the present day Olympic Conference, based on total regional championships or state qualifications through the 2008-2009 winter season, are:

- Monmouth-Roseville (and formerly Monmouth): 127 regional titles or state qualifications (averaging 3.7 per year in conference).
- Sherrard: 89 regional titles or state qualifications (averaging 2.6 per year in conference).
- Macomb: 86 regional titles or state qualifications (averaging 3.7 per year in conference).

The most successful individual programs in the present day Olympic Conference, based on rate of regional championship or state qualification production per year in the conference, are:

- Monmouth-Roseville (and formerly Monmouth) Boys Golf: Won regional, or qualified for state, 85% of years in the conference. Eight state championships and 15 top four finishes.
- Abingdon Girls Bowling: Qualified for state 83% of years in the conference. One state championship and 4 top four finishes.
- Farmington Boys Basketball: Won regional 61% of years in the conference. Four state appearances and 2 top four finishes.
- Orion Girls Volleyball: Won regional 53% of years in the conference.
- Macomb Music: Placed in the state's top ten 52% of years in the conference.
- Macomb Boys Football: Qualified for state 52% of years in the conference.
