= Bridgeford =

Bridgeford or Bridgford may refer to:

People

- Kim Bridgeford (1959–2020), American poet
- Lane Bridgford (1898–1973), American football player

Places

- Great Bridgeford, Staffordshire, United Kingdom
- West Bridgford, Nottinghamshire, United Kingdom
- East Bridgford, Nottinghamshire, United Kingdom
- Bridgeford, Saskatchewan, Canada
