= Aledo High School =

Aledo High School may refer to:

- Aledo High School (Illinois), located in Aledo, Illinois, United States
- Aledo High School (Texas), located in Aledo, Texas, United States
