= Williamsfield High School =

Coordinates: 40°55′37.1″N 90°1′18.4″W

- 325 Kentucky Avenue; Williamsfield, Illinois; USA

Information
- Type: Public secondary
- Teaching staff: 10.60 (FTE)
- Grades: 9–12
- Enrollment: 73 (2018–19)
- Student to teacher ratio: 6.89
- Campus: Rural, fringe
- Color
- Athletics: Lincoln Trail Conference; ICAC
- Mascot: Bombers
- Website: Williamsfield High School

Williamsfield High School, or WHS, is a public four-year high school located at 325 Kentucky Avenue in Williamsfield, Illinois, a village of Knox County, Illinois, in the Midwestern United States. WHS is part of Williamsfield Community Unit School District 210, which also includes Williamsfield Middle School, and Williamsfield Elementary School. The campus is located in Williamsfield, Illinois, 20 miles east of Galesburg, Illinois, and serves a mixed village and rural residential community. The school is in the Galesburg micropolitan statistical area which includes all of Knox and Warren counties.

== Academics ==
Williamsfield High School offers courses in the following academic departments:

- English
- Mathematics
- Science
- Social Studies
- Health
- Foreign Languages
- Business
- Family and Consumer Science
- Agriculture
- Driver Education
- Art
- Music
- Physical Education
- Learning Disabilities
- Galesburg Area Vocational Center

== Athletics ==
Williamsfield High School competes in the Inter County Athletic Conference and Lincoln Trail Conference as a member school in the Illinois High School Association. Its mascot is the Bomber. The school has no state championships on record in team athletics and activities. They formed a cooperative agreement with nearby Galva High School for boys football in 2009-2010.
