= Knoxville High School =

Knoxville High School may refer to:

- Knoxville High School (Illinois), United States
- Knoxville High School (Iowa), United States
- Knoxville High School (Tennessee), United States
