= DeVry Advantage Academy =

DeVry Advantage Academy may refer to DeVry University-affiliated high schools in three cities:

- DeVry Advantage Academy in Chicago, Illinois
- DeVry Advantage Academy in Houston, Texas
- DeVry Advantage Academy in Columbus, Ohio
