= Abingdon High School =

Abingdon High School may refer to:

- Abingdon-Avon High School, in Abingdon, Illinois, US
- Abingdon High School (Virginia), in Abingdon, Virginia, US
- Abingdon School, in Abingdon, Oxfordshire, England, UK

== See also ==
- Abington High School, Abington, Massachusetts, US
- Abingdon Boys School, a Japanese rock band
