= Wethersfield High School =

Wethersfield High School may refer to:

- Wethersfield High School (Connecticut), Wethersfield, Connecticut
- Wethersfield High School (Illinois), Kewanee, Illinois
