= AlWood High School =

Public school in Woodhull, Illinois, United States

Coordinates: 41°10′52″N 90°18′49″W

- 301 E. Fifth Ave. Woodhull, Illinois; United States

Information
- Type: Public secondary
- Teaching staff: 10.71 (FTE)
- Grades: 7–12
- Enrollment: 197 (2023–2024)
- Student to teacher ratio: 10.71
- Color
- Mascot: Aces
- Yearbook: Yes
- Website: www.alwood.net

AlWood High School, or AHS, is a public four-year high school located at 301 E. Fifth Avenue in Woodhull, Illinois, a village in Clover Township of Henry County, Illinois, in the Midwestern United States. The name AlWood comes from the combination of Alpha and Woodhull, two villages in southwestern Henry County which each had their own high schools until a consolidation in 1948. AHS is part of AlWood Community Unit School District 225, which also includes AlWood Middle School, and AlWood Elementary School. The school is combined with the Alwood Middle School to form Alwood Middle-High School. This is the result of an addition to the high school building and demolition of the former middle school building in 2001. However, academics, athletics, and activities remain mostly separate. The campus is 25 miles southeast of Moline, Illinois and 20 miles north of Galesburg, Illinois. It serves a mixed village and rural residential community. The school is the only high school in the village of Woodhull. The school is near the Quad Cities and is part of the Davenport-Moline-Rock Island, IA-IL metropolitan statistical area.

== Academics ==
AlWood Middle-High School is currently Fully Recognized meaning the school made Adequate Yearly Progress and is currently in compliance with state testing and standards. However, the combined scores of both AlWood Middle School and High School students to form a composite rating for AlWood Middle-High school masks the discrepancy between the two. In 2009, 52% of high school students tested met or exceeded state standards on the Prairie State Achievement Examination, a state test that is part of the No Child Left Behind Act. In 2009, 87% of middle school students tested met or exceeded standards on the Illinois Standards Achievement Test, also a state test that is part of the No Child Left Behind Act. Many Illinois school districts see a decrease as grade level increases. However, other high schools in the 52% standards range are not marked as making adequate yearly progress, and have received an Academic Early Warning Status rather than being marked as Fully Recognized. The school's average high school graduation rate between 2000 and 2009 was 95%.

In 2009, the AlWood Middle-High School faculty was 47 teachers, averaging 18.3 years of experience, and of whom 35% held an advanced degree. The average high school class size was 19.3 The high school student to faculty ratio was 10.4. The district's instructional expenditure per student was $5,939. AlWood Middle-High School enrollment decreased from 281 to 263 (6%) in the period of 1999–2009.

== Athletics ==
AlWood High School competes in the Lincoln Trail Conference and is a member school in the Illinois High School Association, commonly referred to as the IHSA. Its mascot is the Aces, and has been also seen as the Flying Aces. The school has no state championships on record in team athletics and activities. However, the 1993 Lady Aces basketball team got second in the state championship. In 1998, AlWood's first golf team was formed by the then athletic director, Steve Lemon. Cooperative athletics partnerships with neighboring high schools are common in recent years due, in large part, to Alwood High School's enrollment of less than 200 students. In 2009, Alwood cooperated with ROWVA High School for football, and began a new partnership with Cambridge High School under the name of the Ridgewood Spartans for many other sports and activities.

== History ==
- 1925 – Old Woodhull High School is opened.
- 1948 – Alpha and Woodhull High Schools consolidate as AlWood.
- 1995 – A $300,000 referendum for improvements for the elementary school passes with a 486 yes / 418 no vote. The previous year a $700,000 referendum had failed 326–697.
- 1998 – A consolidation study is completed that included AlWood, Cambridge, and Orion school districts. The major recommended changes at that time included: 1) build a new high school, 2) convert the existing high schools into 5–8 buildings, 3) convert existing elementary buildings to K-4 buildings; eliminate the old AlWood Junior High and Orion Junior High.
- 1999 – A $3,695,000 referendum for a new middle school addition passes with a 713 yes / 303 no vote. The previous year, a $4,715,000 referendum for the high school failed with a vote of 511 to 794.
- 2001 – The new middle school addition opens for classes, and the old school is demolished.
- 2006 – Consolidation studies are completed that included a four-school consolidation of AlWood, Cambridge, Galva, and R.O.W.V.A., as well as a two-school consolidation of AlWood and R.O.W.V.A.
- 2007 (Summer/Fall) – The AlWood and R.O.W.V.A. Boards of Education form a Committee of Ten to further explore the possibility of consolidation of the two school districts. The major recommended changes include: 1) continue to offer Pre-K through fifth grade in the individual community elementary schools, 2) convert the existing AlWood Middle/High School into a grade 6–8 middle school for the new consolidated district, 3) House grades 9–12 at the current R.O.W.V.A. High School.

Alpha High School opened in the late 19th century. The official name of the Alpha High School athletic teams was the Bulldogs. However, the Alpha teams were sometimes referred to as the "Miners" because of the coal mines which once existed around the area. The Alpha High School building is used as the elementary school for the Alwood school district. Woodhul High School also opened in the late 19th century. The mascot of Woodhull High School was the Cardinals. The original school building was used as the AlWood Middle School and sat adjacent to the current Alwood High School building until it was demolished in 2001.
