= Trivoli, Illinois =

- Census designated place
- in Illinois Trivoli, Illinois (the United States)
- Coordinates: 40°41′45″N 89°52′50″W
- Country: United States
- State: Illinois
- County: Peoria

Area
  - Total: 1.52 sq mi (3.94 km^{2})
  - Land: 1.52 sq mi (3.94 km^{2})
  - Water: 0 sq mi (0.00 km^{2})
- Elevation: 751 ft (229 m)

Population (2020)
  - Total: 385
  - Density: 252.9/sq mi (97.66/km^{2})
- Time zone: UTC-6 (Central (CST))
  - Summer (DST): UTC-5 (CDT)
- ZIP code: 61569
- Area code: 309
- GNIS feature ID: 2804097

Trivoli is a census-designated place (CDP) in Peoria County, Illinois, United States, on Illinois Route 116 east of Farmington. As of the 2020 census, Trivoli had a population of 385. Trivoli has a part-time post office.

== Demographics ==
Historical population
Census	Pop.	Note	%±
2020	385		—
U.S. Decennial Census

Trivoli first appeared as a census designated place in the 2020 U.S. census.

Trivoli CDP, Illinois – Racial and ethnic composition Note: the US Census treats Hispanic/Latino as an ethnic category. This table excludes Latinos from the racial categories and assigns them to a separate category. Hispanics/Latinos may be of any race.
Race / Ethnicity (NH = Non-Hispanic)	Pop 2020	2020
White alone (NH)	348	90.39%
Black or African American alone (NH)	0	0.00%
Native American or Alaska Native alone (NH)	2	0.52%
Asian alone (NH)	0	0.00%
Native Hawaiian or Pacific Islander alone (NH)	0	0.00%
Other race alone (NH)	2	0.52%
Mixed race or Multiracial (NH)	18	4.68%
Hispanic or Latino (any race)	15	3.90%
Total	385	100.00%

== Education ==
The school district is Farmington Central Community Unit School District 265.
