= Lane Bridgford =

American football player (1898–1973)

No. 11, 4
- Position: Halfback

Personal information
- Born: August 11, 1898; Joy, Illinois, U.S.
- Died: July 12, 1973 (aged 74); Arcadia, California, U.S.
- Listed height: 5 ft 10 in (1.78 m)
- Listed weight: 180 lb (82 kg)

Career information
- High school: Joy
- College: Knox (1916–1919)

Career history
- Rock Island Independents (1921–1922)
- Stats at Pro Football Reference

Lane Bridgford (August 11, 1898 – July 12, 1973) was an American professional football halfback who played for the Rock Island Independents of the National Football League (NFL). He played college football at Knox College.

== Early life ==
Lane Bridgford was born on August 11, 1898, in Joy, Illinois. He attended Joy High School. He then briefly attended William & Vashti College.

== College career ==
Bridgford played college football at Knox College, and was a four-year letterman from 1916 to 1919. He was captain of the 1918 team. He earned all-state honors and scored 26 career touchdowns, a school record that stood until 1989. As of 2022, he was still in the top 10 in school history in a dozen statistical categories, including most extra points in a game with nine, fourth-most points in a game with 27; fourth-most career points with 180; sixth-most points in a season with 95; sixth-most touchdowns in a season with 12, and sixth-most career touchdowns with 26. Bridgford still holds the Knox record for most fumble recovery touchdowns in a season with two in 1916 (a 35-yarder and an 85-yarder). The 1919 Knox Purple and Gold football team were the only undefeated team in school history, beating their opponents by a combined score of 295–7. Bridgford graduated from Knox College in 1920, and was inducted into the Knox-Lombard Athletic Hall of Fame in 2022.

== Professional career ==
Bridgford played in five games, starting four, for the Rock Island Independents of the American Professional Football Association (now National Football League) in 1921. On October 23, 1921, against the Detroit Tigers, he was "banished" from the game for "slugging" Norb Sacksteder. In 1922, Bridgford appeared in three games, starting one, for the Independents in the newly renamed NFL.

== Personal life ==
In the 1920s, Bridgford, along with his brother Reed Bridgford, became known for their Bridgford Brothers stable of show horses that they toured the United States and Canada with. In the early 1930s, Lane joined the Carnatation Farm stable. He later became a race horse trainer in the Los Angeles area.

Bridgford later lived in Arcadia, California. He suffered a stroke in 1973 and died on July 12, 1973, at a hospital in Arcadia.
