= Cambridge High School (Illinois) =

Public school in Cambridge, Illinois, US

Coordinates: 41°17′55″N 90°11′58″W

- 300 S. West St. Cambridge, Illinois; USA

Information
- Type: Public secondary
- Principal: Robert Reagan
- Teaching staff: 20.73 (FTE)
- Grades: 7-12
- Enrollment: 235 (2023–2024)
- Student to teacher ratio: 11.34
- Campus: Rural, fringe
- Colors: Navy and white
- Mascot: Spartans
- Website: Cambridge High School

Cambridge High School, or CHS, is a public four-year high school located at 300 S. West St. in Cambridge, Illinois, a village in Cambridge Township of Henry County, Illinois, in the Midwestern United States. CHS is part of Cambridge Community Unit School District 227, which also includes Cambridge Junior High School, and Cambridge Elementary School. The school is combined with the Cambridge Junior High School to form Cambridge Junior-Senior High School. However, academics, athletics, and activities remain mostly separate. The campus is 24 miles southeast of Moline, Illinois and serves a mixed village and rural residential community. The school is the only high school in the village of Cambridge. The school is near the Quad Cities and is part of the Davenport-Moline-Rock Island, IA-IL metropolitan statistical area.

== Academics ==
Cambridge Middle-High School is currently Fully Recognized meaning the school made Adequate Yearly Progress and is currently in compliance with state testing and standards. In 2009, 88% of middle school students tested met or exceeded standards on the Illinois Standards Achievement Test, also a state test that is part of the No Child Left Behind Act. Many Illinois school districts see a decrease in percentile as grade level increases. The school's average high school graduation rate between 1999-2009 was 98%.

In 2009, the Cambridge Junior-Senior High School faculty was 48 teachers, averaging 13.8 years of experience, and of whom 31% held an advanced degree. The average high school class size was 14.6 The high school student to faculty ratio was 7.9. The district's instructional expenditure per student was $5,639. Cambridge High School enrollment decreased from 168 to 167 (0.6%) in the period of 1999-2008. The enrollment of Cambridge Junior-Senior High School was 221 in 2009.

== Athletics ==
Cambridge High School competes in the Lincoln Trail Conference and is a member school in the Illinois High School Association. Its mascot is the Viking. The school has no state championships on record in team athletics and activities. A cooperative partnerships with neighboring AlWood High School was recently formed to provide opportunities despite low enrollment numbers for several athletics and activities. In 2009 the new partnership was officially branded under the name of the Ridgewood Spartans. It currently exists for football, dance, cheerleading, track, basketball, softball, and volleyball in the 8-man West.

== History ==
The school is on the list of the oldest public high schools in the United States.
