= Sherrard Banking Company =

- U.S. National Register of Historic Places
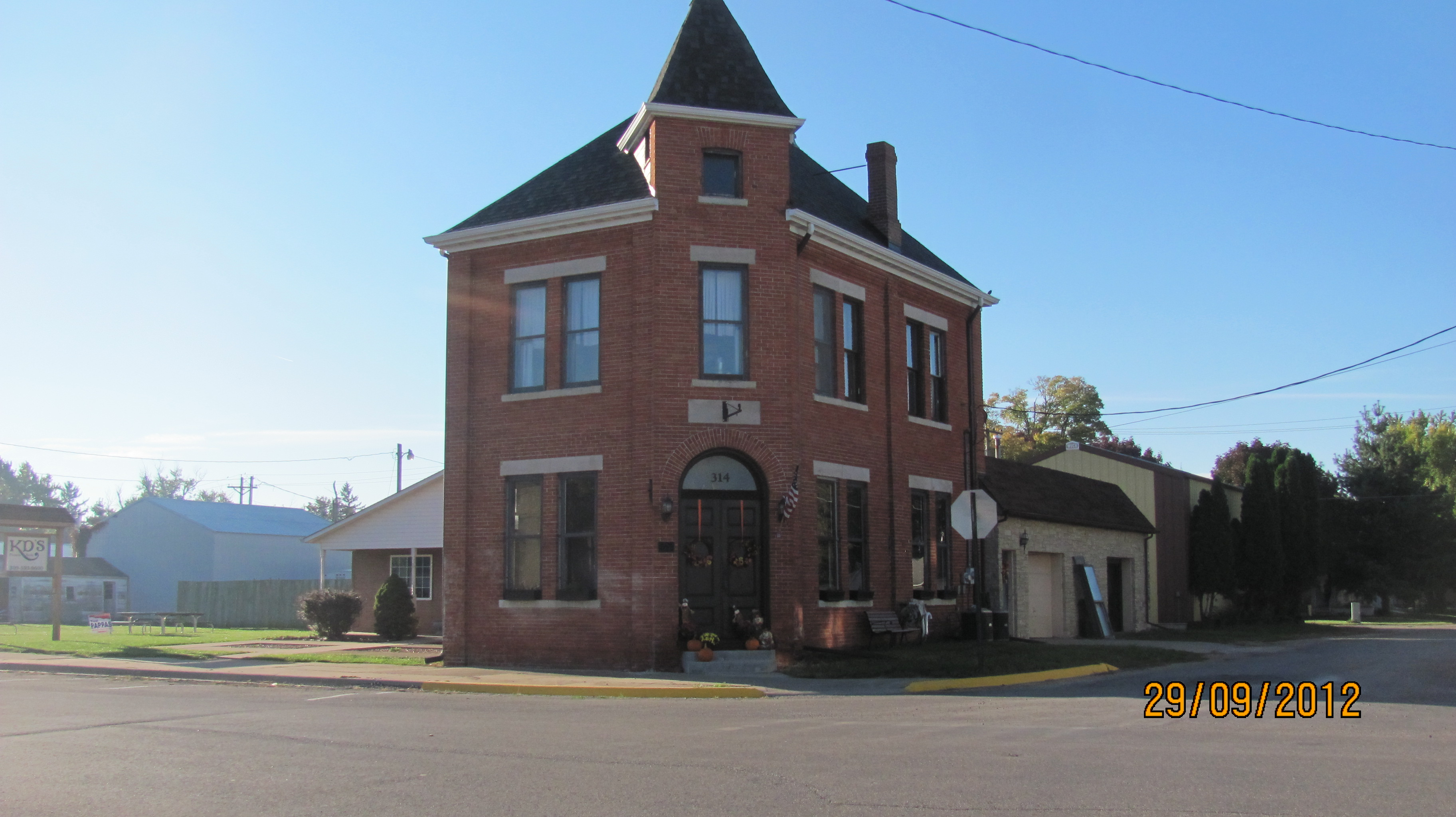

- Location within Illinois Location within the United States
- Location: 314 Third St., Sherrard, Illinois
- Coordinates: 41°19′8″N 90°30′20″W
- Area: less than one acre
- Built: 1896
- Architectural style: Late Victorian
- NRHP reference No.: 96000092
- Added to NRHP: February 16, 1996

The Sherrard Banking Company is a historic bank located at 314 Third Street in the village of Sherrard, Illinois. David Sherrard had the bank built in 1896, two years after he founded the village. The two-story brick building has a Late Victorian commercial design. The main entrance is at the front corner of the building; a pyramidal tower projects from the steep roof above the entrance. The building's decorations includes an arched entrance and stone window sills and lintels; its relative lack of ornamentation signifies the shift away from the elaborate features widely used earlier in the Victorian period. The first floor of the building was used for the bank, while the second held private professional offices, a common configuration at the time.

The bank was added to the National Register of Historic Places on February 16, 1996.
