= Fred Venturelli =

American football player (1917–1990)

Profile
- Position: Placekicker

Personal information
- Born: August 22, 1917; Farmington, Illinois, U.S.
- Died: January 20, 1990 (aged 72); Racine, Wisconsin, U.S.
- Listed height: 5 ft 11 in (1.80 m)
- Listed weight: 235 lb (107 kg)

Career information
- High school: Racine (WI) Washington Park
- College: None

Career history
- Chicago Bears (1948)

Career statistics
- Field Goal Attempts: 2
- Field Goals Made: 1
- Extra Point Attempts: 4
- Extra Points Made: 4
- Stats at Pro Football Reference

Fred Venturelli (August 22, 1917 – January 20, 1990) was an American football placekicker.

== Biography ==
Venturelli was born on August 22, 1917, in Farmington, Illinois. On September 21, 1940, he married Marguerite Heuer.

Venturelli died on January 20, 1990, in Racine, Wisconsin, and was buried in Mount Pleasant, Wisconsin.

== Career ==
Venturelli was briefly a member of the Chicago Bears during the 1948 NFL season. He did not play at college level.
