= Annawan High School =

Location
- 501 West South Street; Annawan, Illinois 61234; United States; 41°23′37″N 89°54′40″W

Information
- Type: Public secondary
- School district: Annawan Community Unit School District 226
- Principal: Dawn Heitzler
- Teaching staff: 9.70 (FTE)
- Grades: 9–12
- Enrollment: 99 (2023–2024)
- Student to teacher ratio: 9.86
- Campus: Rural, fringe
- Colors: Maroon and white
- Nickname: Braves
- Website: www.annawan226.org

Annawan High School, or AHS, is a public four-year high school located at 501 W South St. in Annawan, Illinois, a village in Annawan Township of Henry County, Illinois, in the Midwestern United States. AHS is part of Annawan Community Unit School District 226, which also includes Annawan Grade School, and Annawan Preschool. The campus is 33 miles east of Moline, Illinois and serves a mixed village and rural residential community. The school is the only high school in the village of Annawan. The school is near the Quad Cities and is part of the Davenport-Moline-Rock Island, IA-IL metropolitan statistical area.

== Academics ==
Annawan High School is Fully Recognized as making adequate yearly progress and remaining in compliance with state compliance and testing standards. In 2009, 73% of students tested met or exceeded standards. AHS made Adequate Yearly Progress on the Prairie State Achievement Examination, a state test that is part of the No Child Left Behind Act. The school's average high school graduation rate between 2000-2009 was 96%.

In 2009, the faculty was 35 teachers, averaging 13.3 years of experience, and of whom 31% held an advanced degree. The average class size was 12.7. The student to faculty ratio was 10.9. The district's instructional expenditure per student was $5,183. School enrollment decreased from 129 to 123 (5%) in the period of 1999-2009

== Athletics ==
Annawan High School competes in the Lincoln Trail Conference and is a member school in the Illinois High School Association. Its mascot is the Braves. The school won 4th place at state in Basketball in 2009. AHS is in a cooperative arrangement with neighboring high school Wethersfield High School (Kewanee) for most all athletics other than basketball and volleyball.

The girls basketball team won IHSA Class 1A state titles in 2014 and 2017.

== History ==
The first public school in Annawan was organized in 1854 and was held in the Village townhouse. The townhouse was a meeting hall which was also used for trials and village board meetings. In 1870 a two-story frame building was constructed on a one square block site close to the business district. This block served as an educational site for the next 104 years, until an additional bus storage and maintenance facility were built with the funds realized from the sale of the Hooppole School, which had closed after declining enrollment rates.

=== Hooppole High School ===
Hooppole High School was formed in the late 1800s and served the community proudly until its closing in 1948. Upon closure it was decided the children of Hooppole would attend school in nearby Annawan. The high school hosted basketball games through the 1948 season. During the 1960s and 1970s Hooppole hosted the first and second grade classes as part of the Annawan school system in a school building on the south side of town (pictured below). Annawan built an all-inclusive school in 1974. As pointed out by Terry Rosebeck, the school building in Hooppole continued hosting 1st and 2nd grade classes until it was closed in the spring of 1979. That building is now used for a private business.
