= Knoxville High School (Illinois) =

Location
- 600 East Main Street; Knoxville, Illinois 61448; United States
- 40°54′25″N 90°16′34″W

Information
- Type: Public high school
- Motto: We Are Knoxville
- School district: Knoxville Community Unit School District 202
- Superintendent: Jeff Whitsitt
- Principal: Adam Mize
- Assistant Principal/Activities Director: Brad Weedman
- Administrative Assistant: Sandy Pemberton
- School Board President: Vicki Rose
- Teaching staff: 28.60 (on an FTE basis)
- Grades: 9–12
- Enrollment: 283 (2023–2024)
- Student to teacher ratio: 9.90
- Colors: Navy and gold
- Fight song: Knoxville Cheer Song
- Athletics conference: Lincoln Trail Conference
- Mascot: Bullet Bird
- Nickname: Blue Bullets
- Rival: Abingdon-Avon Tornadoes; Mercer County Golden Eagles
- Yearbook: The Jester
- Website: www.bluebullets.org/o/khs

Knoxville High School (KHS) is a public four-year high school in Knoxville, Illinois, United States. KHS is part of Knoxville Community Unit School District 202, which also includes Knoxville Junior High School, and Mable Woolsey Elementary School. The campus is located in 6 miles southeast of Galesburg, Illinois, and serves a mixed small city and rural residential community. The school is in the Galesburg micropolitan statistical area which includes all of Knox and Warren counties.

== Academics ==
Knoxville High School is currently under Academic Early Warning Status. In 2009, 49% of students tested met or exceeded state standards. KHS did not make Adequate Yearly Progress in 2009 on the Prairie State Achievement Examination, a state test that is part of the No Child Left Behind Act. The school's average high school graduation rate between 1999 and 2009 was 95%.

In 2009 the faculty was 69 teachers, averaging 15.0 years of experience, and of whom 30% held an advanced degree. The average class size was 14.3. The student to faculty ratio was 13.5. The district's instructional expenditure per student was $3,972. School enrollment decreased from 375 to 323 (14%) in the period of 1999-2009 As of 2013, the current student enrollment is 304.

== Athletics ==
Knoxville High School competes in the Lincoln Trail Conference and is a member school in the Illinois High School Association. Its mascot is the Bullet Bird.
