= Vanguard School (Illinois) =

Location
- 2121 South Goebbert Road; Arlington Heights, Cook County, Illinois 60005; United States
- Coordinates: 42.0470°N 87.9749°W

Information
- Status: Open
- School district: Township High School District 214
- Director: Kate Kraft
- Staff: 3
- Faculty: 10
- Mascot: Vipers
- Website: http://vanguard.d214.org/

Vanguard School is a public high school located in Arlington Heights, Illinois. It is part of Township High School District 214.
