= Farmington Central High School (Illinois) =

Farmington Central Schools High School

Location
- 310 North Lightfoot Road; Farmington, Illinois 61531; United States; 40°41′37″N 89°59′3″W

Information
- Type: Public secondary
- Established: 2004
- School district: Farmington Central Community Unit School District 265
- Superintendent: Zac Chatterton
- Dean: Toby Vallas
- Principal: Dennis McMillin
- Teaching staff: 27.56 (FTE)
- Grades: 9–12
- Enrollment: 367 (2023-2024)
- Student to teacher ratio: 13.32
- Campus: Rural, fringe
- Colors: Purple, Gold
- Mascot: Farmers
- PSAE average: 65%
- Website: Farmington Central High School

Farmington Central High School, or FCHS, is a public four-year high school located at 310 North Lightfoot Road across the Peoria County line from Farmington, Illinois, a City of Fulton County, Illinois. FCHS is part of Farmington Central Community Unit School District 265, which also includes Farmington Central Junior High School, and Farmington Central Elementary School. The campus is just east of Farmington, 20 miles (32 km) west of Peoria, Illinois, and serves a mixed town and rural residential communities.

== Academics ==
Farmington Central High School is currently fully recognized, meaning the school made adequate yearly progress and is currently in compliance with state tests and standards. In 2009, 65% of students tested met or exceeded standards. FCHS made Adequate Yearly Progress in 2009 on the Prairie State Achievement Examination, a state test that is part of the No Child Left Behind Act. The school's average high school graduation rate between 2000–2009 was 89%.

The district's faculty is 85 teachers, averaging 14.6 years of experience, and of whom 29% hold an advanced degree. The district's instructional expenditure per student is $3,467.

The average high school class size is 19. The high school student to faculty ratio is 16.8. High school enrollment increased from 413 to 436 (6%) in the period of 1999—2009.

Farmington Central High School was a recipient of an Illinois Honor Roll Academic Improvement Award in 2008. The Illinois State Board of Education in partnership with Northern Illinois University delivers three kinds of awards to recognize schools that demonstrate exemplary academic performance. These awards make up the Illinois Honor Roll. The Academic Improvement Award recognizes schools that have sustained an upward trend in test scores for at least three years and showed a 7.5 point increase this year or a 15 point increase in test scores over the past three years.

== Athletics ==
Farmington Central High School competes and is a member school in the Illinois High School Association. The school's mascot is the Farmer. The school has 2 state championships on record in team athletics and activities, both in Girls' Softball (1988–89 & 1990–91).

== Consolidations ==
Farmington High School consolidated with Yates City High School effective July 1, 1987. High school students from Yates City now attend Farmington Central High School. Prior to this consolidation, Yates City High School existed since 1856, with their last high school building built in 1928. Yates City's failed attempts to consolidate with Elmwood eventually resulted in the consolidation with Farmington. The final class of Yates City High School graduated in May 1987.

== History ==
The first school of Farmington was a log cabin built on the outskirts of Farmington in 1833. The crudely built facilities did not last long and were constantly replaced. Over time, the one room school houses became crowded and demanded that more advanced facilities be built.

The first of these new facilities was the Chapman School, built in 1866 on East Fort Street. Its name came from Phineas Chapman, who donated the land to be built on. The school was three stories tall with the high school on the top floor and the lower grades on the bottom two floors. Late in 1890 the school was destroyed by fire. Chapman School was replaced in 1893 with a new and improved building. The building was state of the art at the time and won an award at the World Fair for its ventilation system.

The next school to be built was the Ward School in 1908, later to be renamed the Harris School. Chapman School also had another wing added. Even with these new facilities, they could not accommodate the surplus of students they were now faced with educating. Therefore, in 1926 a separate high school was built. Now the schools were divided into one elementary school, one junior high school and one high school.

Farmington East Unit District #324 was formed in 1968 from the towns of Smithville, Hanna City, Farmington, Trivoli, and Middle Grove. In 1986, the Yates City and Farmington East Districts combined to become the present Farmington Central District #265.

After passing a referendum in 2001, the District began plans to build a new K-12 campus just east of Farmington. The District partnered with the local towns and transferred ownership of the old school buildings to these entities for use within each town. Some are used for community centers while others are being utilized as city offices.

In August 2004, the new school complex was opened for students.

In May 2014, part of the old school building caught on fire and burned down.
