= Franklin Junior/Senior High School =

High school in Illinois, United States

Coordinates: 39.6235°N 90.0470°W

Location
- 110 State; Franklin, Illinois

Information
- Teaching staff: 15.92 (FTE)
- Enrollment: 141 (2023–2024)
- Student to teacher ratio: 8.86
- Color(s): Orange and black
- Team name: The Flashes
- Website: www.franklinhigh.com/page/franklin-junior-senior-high

Franklin Junior/Senior High School is a school in Franklin in Morgan County, Illinois. The mascot is the Flashes and their colors are orange and black. All high school sports co-op with Waverly High School in Waverly to form the South County Vipers. Their colors are also orange and black.
