= Stark County High School =

Coordinates: 41°5′22″N 89°51′48″W

- 418 S. Franklin Street; Toulon, Illinois; United States

Information
- Type: Public secondary
- Motto: Pride and Excellence
- Principal: Megan McGann
- Teaching staff: 16.93 (FTE)
- Grades: 9–12
- Enrollment: 241 (2022–23)
- Student to teacher ratio: 14.24
- Campus: Rural
- Colors: Red, black and white
- Nickname: Rebels
- Website: jhhs.stark100.com

Stark County High School, or SCHS, is a public four-year high school located at 418 S. Franklin Street in Toulon, Illinois, a village in Stark County, Illinois, in the Midwestern United States. SCHS is part of Stark County Community Unit School District 100, which also includes Stark County Junior High School, and Stark County Elementary School. The campus is 33 miles (53 km) northwest of Peoria, Illinois and serves a mixed village and rural residential community. The school is the only high school in the city of Toulon, and lies within the Peoria metropolitan statistical area.

The district includes Toulon, Wyoming, and La Fayette.

Since July 1, 2001, the school is one of three options for students of Bradford Community Unit School District 1, which, after that date, no longer covered high school.

== Academics ==
Academic departments include:

- Fine Arts
- Language Arts
- Math
- Physical Education, Health, & Driver's Education
- Science
- Social Science
- Vocational

== Athletics ==
Stark County High School competes in the Lincoln Trail Conference and is a member school in the Illinois High School Association. Its mascot is the Rebels. The school has 8 state championships on record in team athletics. The Rebels have also been LTC Conference Champions.

== History ==
Stark County High School replaced 6 high schools:

- Toulon High School
- Toulon Township High School
- LaFayette High School
- Toulon-LaFayette High School
- Wyoming High School
- Bradford High School (students from Bradford are now given the option to attend Stark County High School)

=== Timeline ===
Sources:

- 1847 - Toulon public education program established.
- 1912 - Toulon High School renamed to Toulon Township High School.
- 1970 - Toulon Township High School and LaFayette High School consolidate to form Toulon-LaFayette High School.
- 1992 - Stark County CUSD #100 is formed, consolidating the former Unit District of Toulon/LaFayette and the former High School and Elementary Districts of Wyoming, sending all 10-12 students to Stark County High School.
- 1998- 9th grade students begin attending Stark County High School.
- 2001 - Bradford High School deactivates and some elective students attend Stark County High School.
- 2021- Stark County CUSD #100 begins a renovation of Stark County Junior/Senior High School..
- 2022- Stark County Junior/Senior High School project is completed, including a new high school.
