= Tri-Valley Community Unit School District 3 =

Illinois school district

Address
- 410 E Washington Street Downs, Illinois; United States
- Coordinates: 40°23.6652′N 88°52.002′W

District information
- Type: Unified school district
- Grades: K to 12
- Superintendent: Ben Derges
- NCES District ID: 1713920

Students and staff
- Enrollment: 1080 (2023–2024)
- Teachers: 82.50 - Teachers(on an FTE basis)
- Staff: 81.80 - Other Staff(on an FTE basis)
- Student–teacher ratio: 13:1
- District mascot: Vikings
- Colors: Blue Gold

Other information
- Website: www.tri-valley3.org

Tri-Valley Community Unit School District 3 is a unit school district located in Downs, Illinois, a village in McLean County. It has a student count of 1,080. The school district is composed of three schools, Tri-Valley Elementary School, Tri-Valley Middle School, and Tri-Valley High school

== Administration ==
=== Unit Office Department ===
- Ben Derges - Superintendent
- Amy Bunn - Assistant Executive Secretary
- Samantha Boward - Instructional Curriculum Director

=== Principals ===
- Frank Arnolts - High School Principal
- Sara Burnett - Middle School Principal
- Tyler Swearingen - Elementary School Principal

== History ==
The schooling in the Downs area dates back to 1842, a one-room Spring School House. In 1895 due to an increase in population the school expanded into the Kickapoo Union School District. Around 1902 the one building school district eventually expanded into the present-day three building Tri-Valley School District.

== Standing ==
As of the 2025-26 School year, the school ranks #2 in Bloomington, IL Metro Area High Schools, #56 in Illinois High Schools, and #1374 in National Rankings.

Scorecard
Metric	Percentage
Took at Least One AP Exam	69%
Passed at Least One AP Exam	38%
Mathematics Proficiency	53%
Reading Proficiency	55%
Graduation Rate	99%

== Demographics ==
For the 2023–24 academic year, Tri-Valley High School enrolled 313 students, according to the NCES. The school employed 24.55 (FTE) teachers, resulting in a student to teacher ratio of 12.75:1.

Enrollment by race and ethnicity (2023–24)
Race and ethnicity^{†}	Enrolled pupils	Percentage
African American	2	0.6%
Asian	3	0.9%
Hispanic	8	2%
Native American	0	0%
White	296	94%
Native Hawaiian, Pacific islander	0	0%
Multi-race	4	1%
Total	313	100%
^{†} "Hispanic" includes Hispanics of any race. All other categories refer to non-Hispanics.

Enrollment by gender (2023–24)
Gender	Enrolled pupils	Percentage
Female	160	51%
Male	153	49%
Non-binary	Not Listed	NaN
Total	313	100%

== Athletics ==
The Tri-Valley Vikings compete in the Heart of Illinois Conference (Large Division) and are members of the Illinois High School Association.

=== Sports ===
The following sports are offered:

- Fall: Football, Cross Country, Golf, Volleyball
- Winter: Basketball, Wrestling
- Spring: Baseball, Softball, Track and Field

=== Achievements ===
- Football: Tri-Valley won the IHSA Class 2A State Championship in 2015.
- Track and Field: Stephanie Brown set the IHSA Class 1A record in the 800-meter run (2:09.12) in 2009.
