= Monmouth-Roseville High School =

Public high school in Monmouth, Illinois, USA

Location
- 200 South B Street; Monmouth, Illinois 61462; USA; 40.91065°N 90.6515°W

Information
- Type: Public secondary
- School district: 238
- Principal: Eric Matthews
- Teaching staff: 30.78 (FTE)
- Grades: 9–12
- Enrollment: 483 (2026–2027)
- Student to teacher ratio: 16.76
- Campus: Town
- Colors: Blue, Silver, White
- Fight song: Go, Titans, Go!
- Athletics conference: TRAC
- Mascot: Titan
- Nickname: MR
- Website: Monmouth-Roseville High School

Monmouth-Roseville High School, or MRHS, is a public four-year high school located at 200 South B Street in Monmouth, Illinois, a city of Warren County, Illinois, in the Midwestern United States. MRHS is part of Monmouth-Roseville Community Unit School District 238, which also includes Monmouth-Roseville Junior High School, Central Intermediate School, Harding Primary School, and Lincoln Early Childhood School. The campus is located in Monmouth, IL, 17 miles west of Galesburg, Illinois, and serves a mixed city, village, and rural residential community. The school is in the Galesburg micropolitan statistical area which includes all of Knox and Warren counties. The school is located less than 1 mile from Monmouth College.

== Academics ==
As of 2009, Monmouth-Roseville High School was under Academic Early Warning Status. In 2009, 58% of students tested met or exceeded state standards. MRHS did not make Adequate Yearly Progress in 2009 on the Prairie State Achievement Examination, a state test that is part of the No Child Left Behind Act. The school's average high school graduation rate between 2006-2009 was 88%.

In 2009 the faculty was 122 teachers, averaging 16.0 years of experience, and of whom 24% held an advanced degree. The average class size was 17.0. The student to faculty ratio was 16.3. The district's instructional expenditure per student was $4,804. School enrollment increased from 510 to 531 (4%) in the period of 2006-2009.

As of the 2020-2021 academic year, Monmouth-Roseville was rated a "Commendable School" by the state. The school's graduation rate in 2019 was 90.2%. The faculty in 2019 was 121 teachers, the average class size was 17.7, and the school's instructional spending per student was $5,946. In 2019, 22.3% of the school tested proficient in ELA, while 16.9% tested proficient in Math.

== Athletics ==
Prior to 2005, Monmouth High School had 9 state championships in team athletics and activities, 8 in Boys' Golf and 1 in Boys' Football. Roseville High School had none.

Since 2005, Monmouth-Roseville has not won any state championships, being the state runner-up in Boys Soccer in 2017. From 2005-2009, Monmouth-Roseville competed in the Olympic Conference for all sports. In 2009, football moved to the West Central Conference with all other athletics following in the 2010 school year. In 2016, Monmouth-Roseville High School moved to the Three Rivers Athletic Conference for football, with all other sports following in the 2021 school year. Monmouth-Roseville is a member school in the Illinois High School Association. Its mascot is the Titan.

== Arts ==
The school has several choirs and a band. The music department won second place in the Class B IHSA Music Sweepstakes in 2018-19, and first place in 2019-20.

The speech program won regional titles in Speech Individual Events in 2012-13, 2014–15, and 2015–16.

== Consolidations ==
Monmouth High School consolidated with Roseville High School in 2005 to form Monmouth-Roseville High School. The high school for the Monmouth-Roseville School District is located in the original Monmouth High School building. The Roseville High School building became the Monmouth-Roseville Junior High School.

== Notable alumni ==
- J.P. Machado (born 1976), former NFL offensive lineman
- Mike Miller (born 1964), basketball coach
