= St. Thomas Catholic High School for Boys =

- U.S. National Register of Historic Places
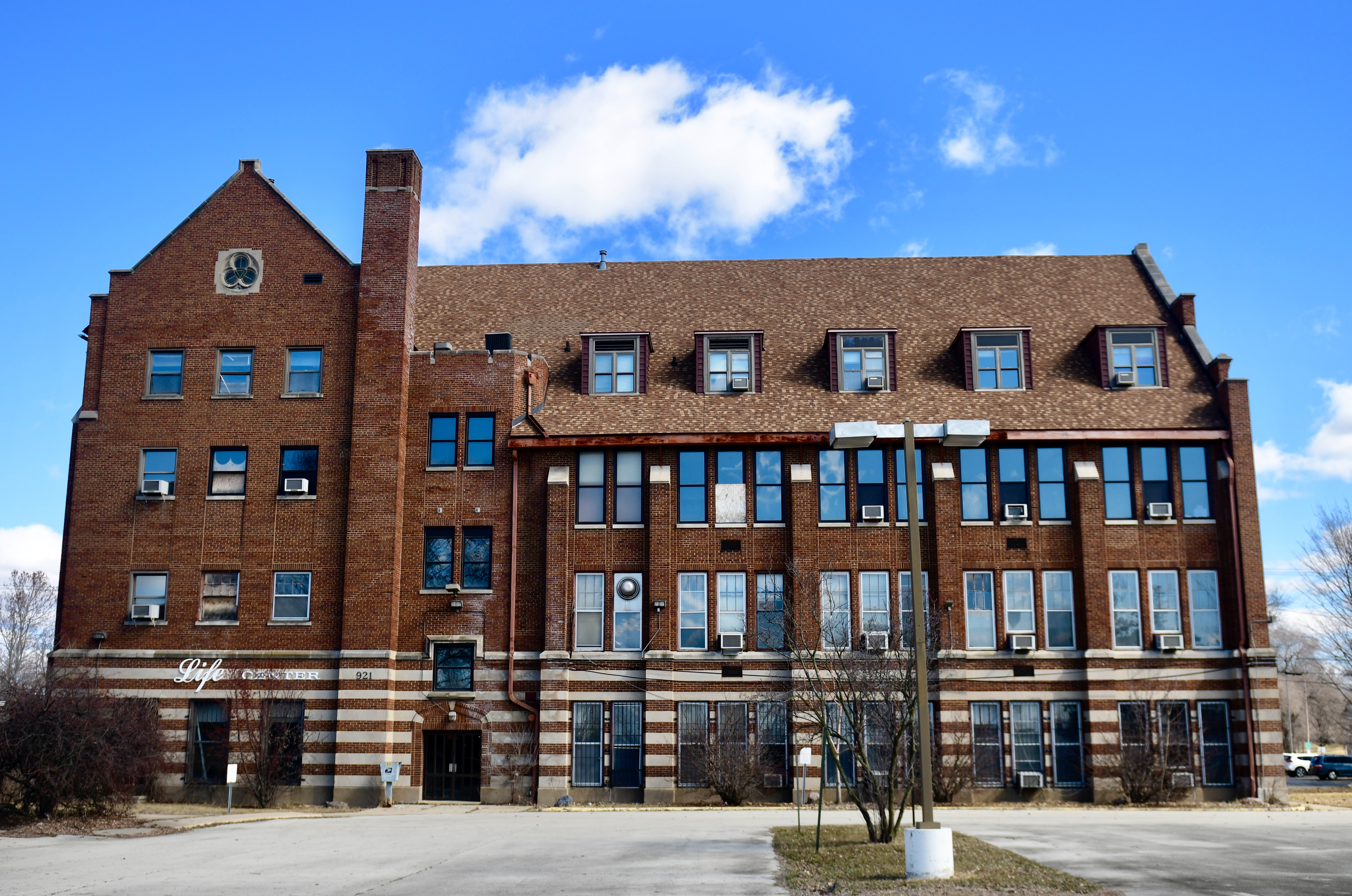

- Location within Illinois Location within the United States
- Location: 921 W. State St., Rockford, Illinois
- Coordinates: 42°16′29″N 89°06′10″W
- Built: 1929
- Architect: Wybe Jelles Van der Meer
- Architectural style: Gothic Revival
- NRHP reference No.: 100002826
- Added to NRHP: October 4, 2018

St. Thomas Catholic High School for Boys is a former Catholic high school building at 921 W. State Street in Rockford, Illinois. The Diocese of Rockford opened the school along with a corresponding girls' school in 1929 to address rising enrollment. Rockford architect Wybe Jelles Van der Meer designed the school in the Gothic Revival style, which was commonly used for Catholic churches and schools. The school's design borrows elements from several subtypes of Gothic Revival, including Tudor Gothic and Collegiate Gothic. It includes a gable roof with a side gable at its eastern end, multicolored brick striping on the first floor, dormers on the north and south sides of the roof, a stone entrance bay with a turret, and trefoil arches and windows. The school closed in 1963 and has since been used as an office building by several Catholic organizations.

The building was added to the National Register of Historic Places on October 4, 2018.
