= Galva High School =

Coordinates: 41°10′38″N 90°02′36″W

Galva High School (Component of Galva Junior-Senior High School)
- 1020 Center Ave. Galva, Illinois; USA

Information
- Type: Public secondary
- Principal: Jerry Joe Becker
- Teaching staff: 18.84 (FTE)
- Grades: 7-12
- Enrollment: 191 (2024–2025)
- Student to teacher ratio: 10.14
- Campus: Small city
- Colors: Maize and blue
- Nickname: Wildcats
- Website: cats.k12.il.us/ghs/

Galva High School, or GHS, is a public four-year high school located at 1020 Center Ave. in Galva, Illinois, a small city in Galva Township of Henry County, Illinois, in the Midwestern United States. GHS is part of Galva Community Unit School District 224, which also includes Galva Junior High School, and Galva Elementary School. The school is combined with the Galva Junior High School to form Galva Junior-Senior High School. However, academics, athletics, and activities remain mostly separate. The campus is 28 miles northeast of Galesburg, Illinois, 42 miles southeast of Moline, Illinois, and serves a mixed small city and rural residential community. The school is the only high school in the city of Galva. The school is part of the Davenport-Moline-Rock Island, IA-IL metropolitan statistical area.

== Academics ==
Galva Junior-Senior High School is currently Fully Recognized meaning the school made Adequate Yearly Progress and is currently in compliance with state testing and standards. However, the combined scores of both Galva Junior High School and Senior High School students to form a composite rating for AlWood Middle-High school masks the discrepancy between the two. In 2009, 47% of high school students tested met or exceeded state standards on the Prairie State Achievement Examination, a state test that is part of the No Child Left Behind Act. In 2009, 87% of junior high school students tested met or exceeded standards on the Illinois Standards Achievement Test, also a state test that is part of the No Child Left Behind Act. Many Illinois school districts see a decrease in percentile as grade level increases. However, other high schools in the 47% standards range are not marked as making adequate yearly progress, and have received an Academic Early Warning Status rather than being marked as Fully Recognized. The school's average high school graduation rate between 2000-2009 was 85%.

In 2009, the Galva Junior-Senior High School faculty was 47 teachers, averaging 13.0 years of experience, and of whom 23.5% held an advanced degree. The average high school class size was 12.0 The high school student to faculty ratio was 10.1. The district's instructional expenditure per student was $4,768. Galva Junior-Senior High School enrollment decreased from 356 to 265 (26%) in the period of 1999-2009.

Galva schools installed one of the first solar power generating systems in local area high schools in the fall of 2009.

== Athletics and activities ==
Galva High School competes in the Lincoln Trail Conference and is a member school in the Illinois High School Association. Its mascot is the Wildcat. The school has no state championships on record in IHSA sponsored team athletics and activities.

In 1993, Galva High School athlete Ryan Preston won the IHSA state championship for the 110 meter high hurdles. In 2018, sophomore Peyton Sopiars became the IHSA Class 1A State Triple Jump Champion for his jump of 45’3/4”.

The Galva High School Dance and Drill Team has won 5 State Championships (2008, 2006, 2005, 2002, 1999) in the Class A Production Category. In 2008, they performed Peter Pan. Since 1994 they have also placed in the state's top 5 in the categories of Kick and Pom. In 2010, they won a state championship in the Class A Musical Theatre category for their performance of Mary Poppins. Galva was the only participant in the category. The Dance and Drill state championship is sponsored by the Illinois Drill Team Association, which is not affiliated with the IHSA.

== Notable alumni ==
- Rich Falk: Former college basketball coach. He was head coach of the Northwestern Wildcats team from 1978 to 1986. Currently, Falk is the Associate Commissioner of the Big Ten Conference.
