= Woodhull, Illinois =

Woodhull
- Village
- Location of Woodhull in Henry County, Illinois.
- Coordinates: 41°10′42″N 90°19′20″W
- Country: United States
- State: Illinois
- County: Henry
- Incorporated: 1870

Area
  - Total: 0.88 sq mi (2.29 km^{2})
  - Land: 0.88 sq mi (2.29 km^{2})
  - Water: 0 sq mi (0.00 km^{2})
- Elevation: 810 ft (250 m)

Population (2020)
  - Total: 754
  - Density: 854.6/sq mi (329.95/km^{2})
- Time zone: UTC-6 (CST)
  - Summer (DST): UTC-5 (CDT)
- ZIP code: 61490
- Area code: 309
- FIPS code: 17-83063
- GNIS feature ID: 2393914
- Website: www.woodhullil.org

Woodhull is a village in Henry County, Illinois. As of the 2020 census, the village had a population of 754.

== History ==
The town was laid out by Maxwell Woodhull on September 30, 1857. An addition was laid out in 1867, and another in 1870. That same year, the town was incorporated. In 1994, the High School girls' basketball team almost made history in the I.H.S.A. Basketball state championship but came up short.

== Geography ==
According to the 2021 census gazetteer files, Woodhull has a total area of 0.88 square miles (2.28 km^{2}), all land.

== Demographics ==
Historical population
Census	Pop.	Note	%±
1880	650		—
1890	608		−6.5%
1900	774		27.3%
1910	692		−10.6%
1920	700		1.2%
1930	567		−19.0%
1940	638		12.5%
1950	718		12.5%
1960	779		8.5%
1970	905		16.2%
1980	901		−0.4%
1990	808		−10.3%
2000	809		0.1%
2010	811		0.2%
2020	754		−7.0%
U.S. Decennial Census

As of the 2020 census there were 754 people, 318 households, and 197 families residing in the village. The population density was 854.88 inhabitants per square mile (330.07/km^{2}). There were 378 housing units at an average density of 428.57 per square mile (165.47/km^{2}). The racial makeup of the village was 96.42% White, 0.80% African American, 0.00% Native American, 0.00% Asian, 0.00% Pacific Islander, 0.66% from other races, and 2.12% from two or more races. Hispanic or Latino of any race were 2.92% of the population.

There were 318 households, out of which 23.6% had children under the age of 18 living with them, 52.83% were married couples living together, 5.03% had a female householder with no husband present, and 38.05% were non-families. 27.99% of all households were made up of individuals, and 10.69% had someone living alone who was 65 years of age or older. The average household size was 2.98 and the average family size was 2.36.

The village's age distribution consisted of 20.9% under the age of 18, 8.0% from 18 to 24, 28.8% from 25 to 44, 22.2% from 45 to 64, and 20.1% who were 65 years of age or older. The median age was 40.8 years. For every 100 females, there were 119.2 males. For every 100 females age 18 and over, there were 128.0 males.

The median income for a household in the village was $57,656, and the median income for a family was $89,375. Males had a median income of $42,188 versus $32,875 for females. The per capita income for the village was $30,511. About 5.1% of families and 11.8% of the population were below the poverty line, including 12.1% of those under age 18 and 8.6% of those age 65 or over.

== Education ==
It is in the Alwood Community Unit School District 225.

AlWood Middle-High School is located in Woodhull, with students coming from nearby Alpha after the merger in the early 1950s. Students also attend from the country surrounding Ophiem, Lynn Center, Andover, Cambridge, New Windsor, Rio, and Oneida. The school's mascot is the Aces, although it has been referred to as the "Flying Aces" numerous times.

== Notable people ==
- Don Samuelson, 25th governor of Idaho from 1967 to 1971; born in Woodhull.
- Daniel Swanson, Illinois state representative; born in Woodhull.
