= Toulon, Illinois =

- City
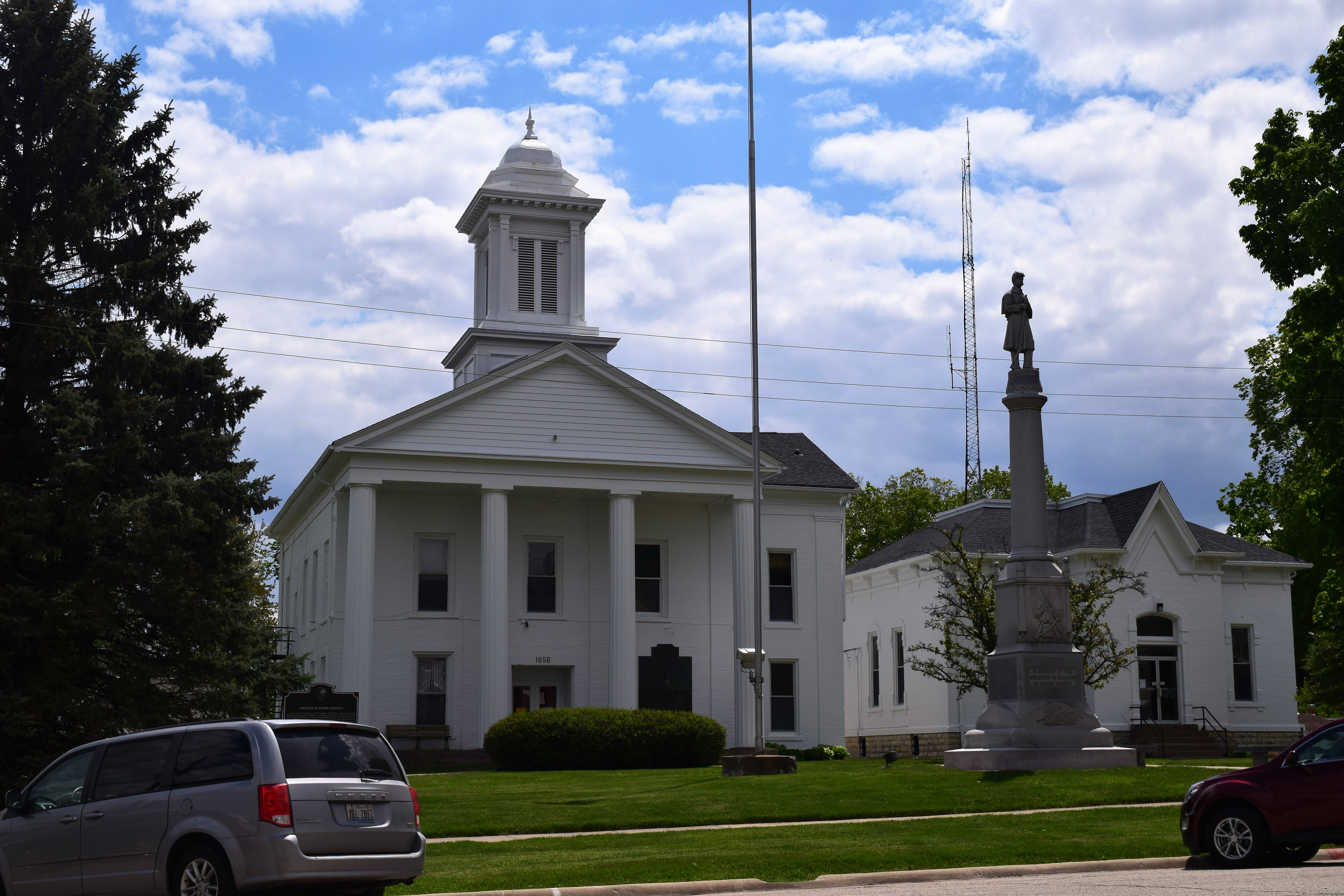
- Stark County Courthouse in Toulon
- Interactive map of Toulon, Illinois
- Location within Illinois Location within the United States
- Coordinates: 41°05′44″N 89°52′24″W
- Country: United States
- State: Illinois
- County: Stark

Area
  - Total: 1.02 sq mi (2.63 km^{2})
  - Land: 1.02 sq mi (2.63 km^{2})
  - Water: 0 sq mi (0.00 km^{2})
- Elevation: 735 ft (224 m)

Population (2020)
  - Total: 1,193
  - Density: 1,174/sq mi (453.1/km^{2})
- Time zone: UTC-6 (CST)
  - Summer (DST): UTC-5 (CDT)
- ZIP code: 61483
- Area code: 309
- FIPS code: 17-75783
- GNIS feature ID: 2397040
- Website: www.cityoftoulon.org

Toulon is a city and the county seat of Stark County, Illinois, United States. As of the 2020 census, Toulon had a population of 1,193. Toulon is part of the Peoria metropolitan area, and is the northwestern terminus of the Rock Island Trail State Park.

== Geography ==
According to the 2010 census, Toulon has a total area of 1.02 square miles (2.64 km^{2}), all land.

== Demographics ==
Historical population
Census	Pop.	Note	%±
1870	904		—
1880	967		7.0%
1890	945		−2.3%
1900	1,057		11.9%
1910	1,208		14.3%
1920	1,235		2.2%
1930	1,203		−2.6%
1940	1,230		2.2%
1950	1,173		−4.6%
1960	1,213		3.4%
1970	1,207		−0.5%
1980	1,390		15.2%
1990	1,328		−4.5%
2000	1,400		5.4%
2010	1,292		−7.7%
2020	1,193		−7.7%
U.S. Decennial Census

=== 2020 census ===
As of the 2020 census, Toulon had a population of 1,193. The median age was 42.7 years. 22.6% of residents were under the age of 18 and 23.1% of residents were 65 years of age or older. For every 100 females there were 86.7 males, and for every 100 females age 18 and over there were 84.2 males age 18 and over.

0.0% of residents lived in urban areas, while 100.0% lived in rural areas.

There were 475 households in Toulon, of which 29.1% had children under the age of 18 living in them. Of all households, 44.2% were married-couple households, 18.5% were households with a male householder and no spouse or partner present, and 29.9% were households with a female householder and no spouse or partner present. About 35.3% of all households were made up of individuals and 18.4% had someone living alone who was 65 years of age or older.

There were 565 housing units, of which 15.9% were vacant. The homeowner vacancy rate was 2.0% and the rental vacancy rate was 20.1%.

Racial composition as of the 2020 census
Race	Number	Percent
White	1,127	94.5%
Black or African American	5	0.4%
American Indian and Alaska Native	2	0.2%
Asian	2	0.2%
Native Hawaiian and Other Pacific Islander	0	0.0%
Some other race	7	0.6%
Two or more races	50	4.2%
Hispanic or Latino (of any race)	31	2.6%

=== 2000 census ===
As of the census of 2000, there were 1,400 people, 555 households, and 355 families residing in the city. The population density was 1,575.4 inhabitants per square mile (608.3/km^{2}). There were 601 housing units at an average density of 676.3 per square mile (261.1/km^{2}). The racial makeup of the city was 98.64% White, 0.21% African American, 0.50% Native American, 0.07% Asian, 0.07% from other races, and 0.50% from two or more races. Hispanic or Latino of any race were 0.43% of the population.

There were 555 households, out of which 29.7% had children under the age of 18 living with them, 52.8% were married couples living together, 9.0% had a female householder with no husband present, and 36.0% were non-families. 33.2% of all households were made up of individuals, and 20.2% had someone living alone who was 65 years of age or older. The average household size was 2.32 and the average family size was 2.95.

In the city, the population was spread out, with 23.3% under the age of 18, 6.6% from 18 to 24, 23.9% from 25 to 44, 19.4% from 45 to 64, and 26.8% who were 65 years of age or older. The median age was 42 years. For every 100 females, there were 80.4 males. For every 100 females age 18 and over, there were 78.7 males.

The median income for a household in the city was $31,792, and the median income for a family was $40,078. Males had a median income of $32,353 versus $20,556 for females. The per capita income for the city was $16,219. About 6.1% of families and 7.4% of the population were below the poverty line, including 9.8% of those under age 18 and 6.3% of those age 65 or over.

== Education ==
It is within the Stark County Community Unit School District 100.

Stark County High School and Stark County Junior High are located in Toulon.

== Notable people ==
- Charlie Hall, MLB outfielder for the New York Metropolitans
- Ashton C. Shallenberger, governor of Nebraska and U.S. representative from Nebraska
- Paul Unruh, Bradley college basketball player
- Johnny Walker, MLB catcher for the Philadelphia Athletics
