= DeVry Advantage Academy (Illinois) =

Location
- 1900 West Lawrence Avenue; Chicago, Illinois 60640; United States
- 41.942°N 87.692°W

Information
- Opened: July 2004
- School district: Chicago Public Schools
- Gender: Co-ed
- Enrollment: 386 students
- Campus type: Urban
- Website: www.devry.cps.edu

DeVry University Advantage Academy is a 2-year, dual degree high school located in Chicago, Illinois. Operated by a partnership with Chicago Public Schools and DeVry University, the program offers students an opportunity to graduate with a high school diploma and an associate degree in either Networking System Administration or Business. Both high school and college classes are taken at a single location. Until 2019, classes were taken at the original DeVry University Chicago Campus at 3300 N. Campbell Ave.

== History ==
DeVry Advantage Academy first opened in 2004 by then Chicago Public Schools CEO, Arne Duncan. The school has graduated 90% of its senior class of 2013 and is one of the few dual-degree high schools in the USA.
