= United Senior High School (Illinois) =

United High School

Location
- 1905 100th Street; Monmouth, Illinois; USA; 40.90802°N 90.59191°W

Information
- Type: Public secondary
- Principal: Michael Washabaugh
- Teaching staff: 21.74 (FTE)
- Grades: 9–12
- Enrollment: 270 (2023-2024)
- Student to teacher ratio: 12.42
- Campus: Rural, fringe
- Colors: Red, black and white
- Athletics: Football, Baseball, Track & Field, Volleyball, Wrestling
- Nickname: Red Storm
- Website: United High School

United High School, or UHS, is a public four-year high school located near Monmouth, Illinois. UHS is part of United Community Unit School District 304. Despite the Alexis United misnomer sometimes used to describe the high school, the campus is actually located 2 miles east of Monmouth, IL, though the district's north campus and one of the elementary schools is located in Alexis, Illinois. The misnomer is due to the district office previously being located in Alexis, Illinois. It has since been moved to the high school campus. The school serves a mixed city fringe, village, and rural residential community on the outskirts of the city of Monmouth, in the villages of Alexis, Kirkwood, Little York, North Henderson, and the unincorporated communities of Cameron and Gerlaw. Much of the school district is within the Galesburg micropolitan statistical area. United High School was formed by the consolidation of Alexis High School and Monmouth Warren High School in 2004. In 2007, Monmouth Yorkwood High School deactivated and was annexed into United High School.
