= Sherrard, Illinois =

- Village
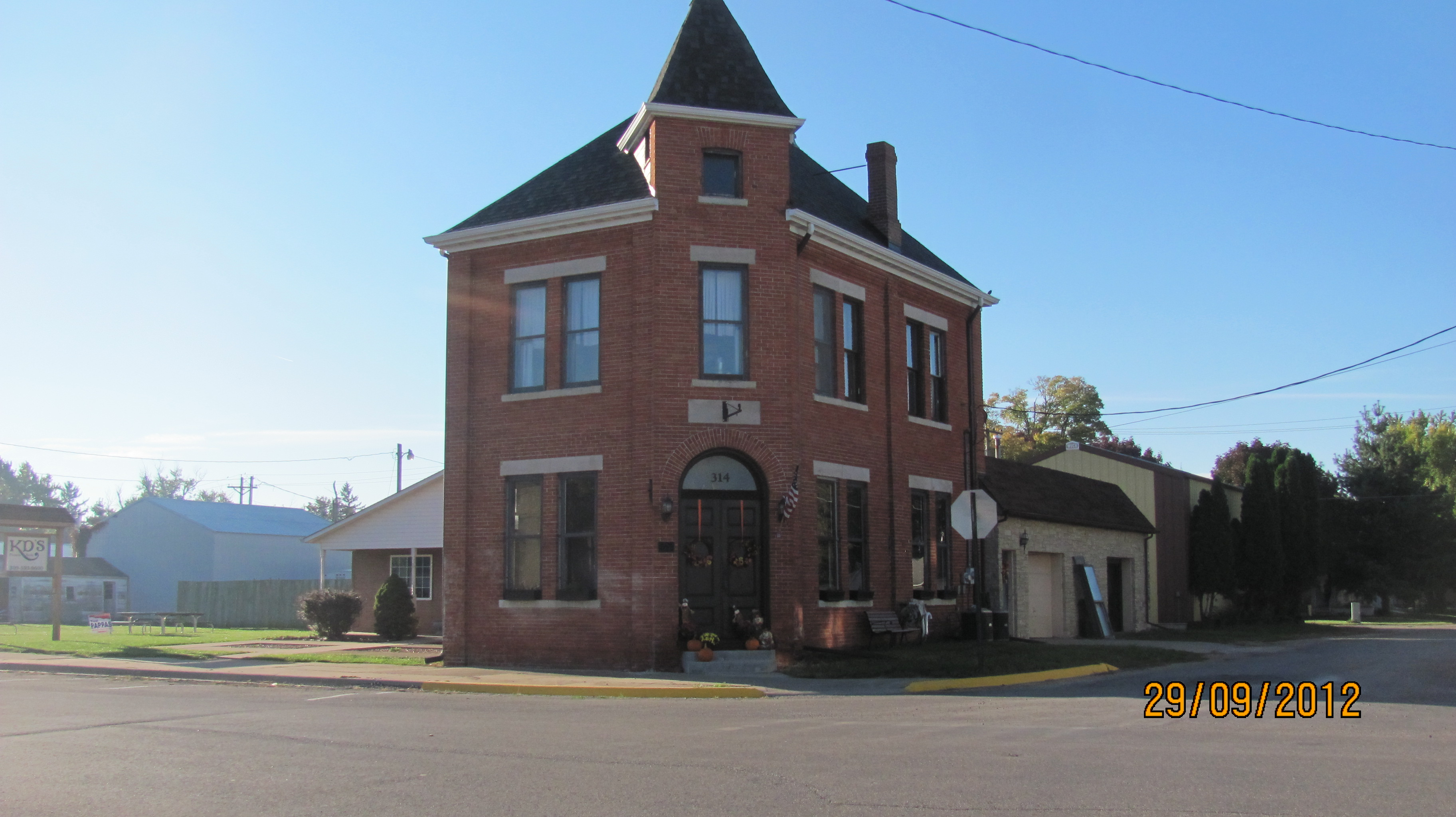
- Sherrard Banking Company building

- Location in Mercer County, Illinois

- Location in the United States
- Coordinates: 41°18′48″N 90°30′08″W
- Country: United States
- State: Illinois
- County: Mercer
- Township: Richland Grove

Area
  - Total: 1.16 sq mi (3.00 km^{2})
  - Land: 0.93 sq mi (2.40 km^{2})
  - Water: 0.23 sq mi (0.60 km^{2})
- Elevation: 805 ft (245 m)

Population (2020)
  - Total: 692
  - Density: 750/sq mi (288/km^{2})
- Time zone: UTC-6 (CST)
  - Summer (DST): UTC-5 (CDT)
- ZIP code: 61281
- Area code: 309
- FIPS code: 17-69368
- GNIS feature ID: 2399803
- Website: www.sherrardillinois.org

Sherrard is a village in Mercer County, Illinois, United States. The population was 692 at the 2020 census.

== Geography ==
Sherrard is located in northeastern Mercer County 20 miles (32 km) northeast of Aledo, the county seat, and 16 miles (26 km) south of Rock Island.

According to the U.S. Census Bureau, Sherrard has a total area of 1.16 square miles (3.00 km^{2}), of which 0.93 square miles (2.41 km^{2}) are land and 0.23 square miles (0.60 km^{2}), or 20.0%, are water. The village sits on a flat-topped ridge that drains north toward Mill Creek, a tributary of the Rock River, and south toward Camp Creek, a tributary of the Edwards River. The village limits extend south to include Fyre Lake and Karl Lake, reservoirs built in a valley leading toward Camp Creek.

== Demographics ==
Historical population
| Census | Pop. | Note | %± |
|---|---|---|---|
| 1900 | 826 | | — |
| 1910 | 906 | | 9.7% |
| 1920 | 437 | | −51.8% |
| 1930 | 327 | | −25.2% |
| 1940 | 415 | | 26.9% |
| 1950 | 484 | | 16.6% |
| 1960 | 574 | | 18.6% |
| 1970 | 808 | | 40.8% |
| 1980 | 811 | | 0.4% |
| 1990 | 697 | | −14.1% |
| 2000 | 694 | | −0.4% |
| 2010 | 640 | | −7.8% |
| 2020 | 692 | | 8.1% |
U.S. Decennial Census

At the 2000 census there were 694 people, 271 households, and 201 families living in the village. The population density was 1,658.2 inhabitants per square mile (640.2/km^{2}). There were 276 housing units at an average density of 659.5 per square mile (254.6/km^{2}). The racial makeup of the village was 98.27% White, 0.14% African American, 0.43% Native American, 0.14% Asian, 0.14% from other races, and 0.86% from two or more races. Hispanic or Latino of any race were 1.59%.

Of the 271 households 34.3% had children under the age of 18 living with them, 60.9% were married couples living together, 11.4% had a female householder with no husband present, and 25.5% were non-families. 22.9% of households were one person and 11.4% were one person aged 65 or older. The average household size was 2.56 and the average family size was 2.99.

The age distribution was 26.1% under the age of 18, 9.2% from 18 to 24, 29.5% from 25 to 44, 22.5% from 45 to 64, and 12.7% 65 or older. The median age was 37 years. For every 100 females, there were 91.7 males. For every 100 females age 18 and over, there were 92.9 males.

The median household income was $47,171 and the median family income was $52,604. Males had a median income of $35,455 versus $21,304 for females. The per capita income for the village was $18,967. About 4.6% of families and 5.0% of the population were below the poverty line, including 10.6% of those under age 18 and 4.2% of those age 65 or over.

== Education ==
Public education is provided by Sherrard Elementary School and Sherrard Junior / Senior High School, home of the Sherrard Tigers. The elementary school is within the village limits, and the junior/senior high school is 2 miles (3 km) northwest of the village.

== Notable people ==
- Don Nelson, NBA basketball player for Boston Celtics, University of Iowa basketball All-American
- Arthur McCandless Wilson (1902–1979), professor of biography and government at Dartmouth College
