= Wethersfield High School (Illinois) =

Coordinates: 41°14′42″N 89°54′32″W

Location
- 439 Willard St. Kewanee, Illinois; USA

Information
- Type: Public secondary
- Established: 1859
- School district: 230
- Principal: Tyler Nichols
- Faculty: 41
- Teaching staff: 20.86 (FTE)
- Grades: 7-12
- Enrollment: 272 (2017–18)
- Student to teacher ratio: 13.04
- Campus: Small city
- Colors: Kelly green and white
- Nickname: Flying Geese
- Website: Wethersfield School District

Wethersfield High School, is a public four-year high school located at 439 Willard St. in Kewanee, Illinois, a city in Kewanee and Wethersfield Townships of Henry County, Illinois, in the Midwestern United States. Wetherfield High School is part of Wethersfield Community Unit School District 230, which also includes Wethersfield Junior High School, and Wethersfield Elementary School. The school is combined with the Wethersfield Junior High School to form Wethersfield Junior-Senior High School. Furthermore, Wethersfield Junior-Senior High School is co-located with Wethersfield Elementary School. Because all students attend the same academic center the school prides itself in getting to know the students over their 13 years of attendance. However, academics, athletics, and activities remain mostly separate and inline with comparable elementary, middle, and high school curriculum. The campus is 40 miles (64 km) northeast of Galesburg, Illinois, 44 miles (71 km) southeast of Moline, Illinois, and serves a mixed village and rural residential community. The school is one of two high schools in the city of Kewanee, the other being Kewanee High School. The school is within the Davenport-Moline-Rock Island, IA-IL metropolitan statistical area.

== Academics ==
Wethersfield Junior-Senior High School is currently Fully Recognized meaning the school made Adequate Yearly Progress and is currently in compliance with state testing and standards. However, the combined scores of both Wethersfield Junior High School and Senior High School students to form a composite rating for Wethersfield Junior-Senior High School masks the discrepancy between the two. In 2009, 52% of senior high school students tested met or exceeded state standards on the Prairie State Achievement Examination, a state test that is part of the No Child Left Behind Act. In 2009, 90% of junior high school students tested met or exceeded standards on the Illinois Standards Achievement Test, also a state test that is part of the No Child Left Behind Act. Many Illinois school districts see a percentage decrease as grade level increases. However, other high schools in the 52% standards range are not marked as making adequate yearly progress, and have received an Academic Early Warning Status rather than being marked as Fully Recognized. The school's average high school graduation rate between 2000-2009 was 89%.

In 2009, the Wethersfield Junior-Senior High School faculty was 41 teachers, averaging 13.5 years of experience, and of whom 45% held an advanced degree. The average high school class size was 12.8 The high school student to faculty ratio was 12.1. The district's instructional expenditure per student was $4,630. Wethersfield Junior-Senior High School enrollment decreased from 317 to 287 (9%) in the period of 1999-2009

== Athletics ==
Wethersfield High School is a member of the Lincoln Trail Conference.

== Sources ==
- Wethersfield Community Unit School District 230
- Interactive Illinois Report Card
- Illinois High School Association
