= Sherrard High School =

Location
- 4701 176th Avenue; Sherrard, Rock Island County, Illinois 61281; United States; 41°20′33″N 90°31′40″W

Information
- Type: Public high school
- School district: Sherrard Community Unit School District 200
- Superintendent: Carl Johnson
- CEEB code: 143910
- NCES School ID: 173618003747
- Principal: Tim Wernentin
- Teaching staff: 33.75 (FTE)
- Grades: 9–12
- Enrollment: 456 (2023–2024)
- Student to teacher ratio: 13.51
- Campus type: Rural
- Colors: Purple and gold
- Team name: Tigers
- Website: Official website

Sherrard High School (SHS) is a public four-year high school located at 4701 176th Avenue, northwest of Sherrard, Illinois, in Rock Island County, in the Midwestern United States. SHS is part of Sherrard Community Unit School District 200, which also includes Matherville Intermediate School, and Sherrard and Winola Elementary Schools. The campus is located approximately 3 miles (4.8 km) north of Sherrard, just north of the Mercer-Rock Island county line, 10 miles (16 km) south of Milan, and serves a mixed village and rural residential community. The school is a short commute to the Quad Cities and part of the Davenport-Moline-Rock Island, IA-IL Metropolitan Statistical Area.

== Academics ==
Sherrard High School is currently under Academic Early Warning Status. In 2009, 55% of students tested met or exceeded standards. SHS did not make Adequate Yearly Progress in 2009 on the Prairie State Achievement Examination, a state test that is part of the No Child Left Behind Act. The school's average high school graduation rate between 2000-2009 was 87%.

The faculty consists of 125 teachers, averaging 13.3 years of experience, and of whom 42% hold an advanced degree. The average class size is 15.5. The student to faculty ratio is 13.4. The district's instructional expenditure per student is $4,751. School enrollment decreased from 519 to 516 (0.6%) in the period of 2000-2009.

== Athletics and activities ==
Sherrard High School competes in the West Central Conference and is a member school of the Illinois High School Association. Its mascot is The Tiger. The school has 4 state championships on record in team athletics and activities: 3 in Chess (1980-81 A, 1981-82 A, and 1982-83 A), and 1 in Girls Track and Field (2006-2007 A).

== Consolidations ==
Sherrard High School consolidated with Winola High School in 1988. High school students from New Windsor and Viola now attend Sherrard High School. Prior to this consolidation, Winola High School existed since 1952 in Viola. Prior to 1952, New Windsor and Viola High Schools existed separately.
