= Williamsfield, Illinois =

- Village
- Location of Williamsfield in Knox County, Illinois
- Coordinates: 40°55′35″N 90°01′05″W
- Country: United States
- State: Illinois
- County: Knox
- Township: Truro

Area
  - Total: 1.23 sq mi (3.19 km^{2})
  - Land: 1.23 sq mi (3.19 km^{2})
  - Water: 0 sq mi (0.00 km^{2})
- Elevation: 702 ft (214 m)

Population (2020)
  - Total: 575
  - Density: 467.1/sq mi (180.36/km^{2})
- Time zone: UTC-6 (CST)
  - Summer (DST): UTC-5 (CDT)
- ZIP code: 61489
- Area code: 309
- FIPS code: 17-81802
- GNIS feature ID: 2399695
- Website: www.williamsfieldil.gov

Williamsfield is a village in Knox County, Illinois, United States. The population was 575 at the 2020 census. It is part of the Galesburg Micropolitan Statistical Area.

== History ==
E.B. Purcell laid out the village in 1888, and a post office was established. The village was reportedly named for a Santa Fe Railroad contractor named Williams.

== Geography ==
Williamsfield is located in eastern Knox County 21 miles (34 km) east of Galesburg, the county seat. Illinois Route 180 runs through the east side of the village, leading north 18 miles (29 km) to Galva and south 1.5 miles (2.4 km) to U.S. Route 150.

According to the 2021 census gazetteer files, Williamsfield has a total area of 1.23 square miles (3.19 km^{2}), all land.

== Demographics ==
Historical population
Census	Pop.	Note	%±
1900	447		—
1910	480		7.4%
1920	435		−9.4%
1930	445		2.3%
1940	470		5.6%
1950	542		15.3%
1960	548		1.1%
1970	552		0.7%
1980	585		6.0%
1990	571		−2.4%
2000	620		8.6%
2010	578		−6.8%
2020	575		−0.5%
U.S. Decennial Census

As of the 2020 census there were 575 people, 206 households, and 133 families residing in the village. The population density was 467.10 inhabitants per square mile (180.35/km^{2}). There were 256 housing units at an average density of 207.96 per square mile (80.29/km^{2}). The racial makeup of the village was 94.61% White, 1.22% African American, 0.17% Native American, 0.35% Asian, 0.00% Pacific Islander, 0.17% from other races, and 3.48% from two or more races. Hispanic or Latino of any race were 1.91% of the population.

There were 206 households, out of which 32.5% had children under the age of 18 living with them, 50.00% were married couples living together, 11.65% had a female householder with no husband present, and 35.44% were non-families. 33.50% of all households were made up of individuals, and 18.93% had someone living alone who was 65 years of age or older. The average household size was 3.14 and the average family size was 2.41.

The village's age distribution consisted of 32.6% under the age of 18, 3.7% from 18 to 24, 26.1% from 25 to 44, 20.2% from 45 to 64, and 17.3% who were 65 years of age or older. The median age was 36.0 years. For every 100 females, there were 88.5 males. For every 100 females age 18 and over, there were 88.5 males.

The median income for a household in the village was $59,167, and the median income for a family was $77,422. Males had a median income of $46,250 versus $32,031 for females. The per capita income for the village was $32,075. About 10.5% of families and 10.2% of the population were below the poverty line, including 12.7% of those under age 18 and 8.0% of those age 65 or over.

There are two churches in Williamsfield. One is Roman Catholic and the other is United Methodist.
