= Farmington, Illinois =

- City
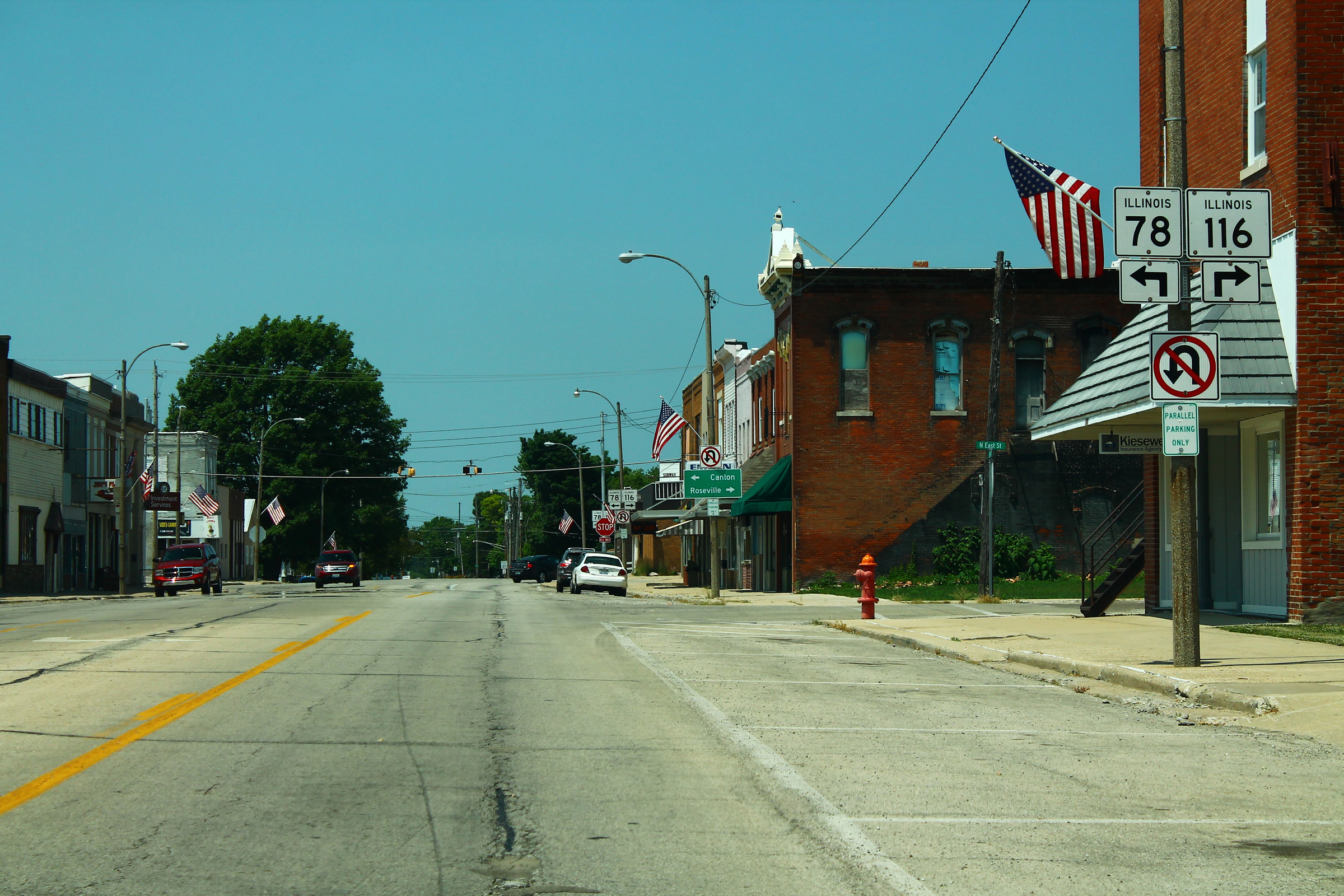
- East Fort Street (Illinois Route 116 and Illinois Route 78) westbound near East Street, a block and a half east of route split at Main Street in Farmington, Illinois.

- Location of Farmington in Peoria County, Illinois.

- Location of Illinois in the United States
- Coordinates: 40°41′49″N 90°00′08″W
- Country: United States
- State: Illinois
- Counties: Fulton
- Townships: Farmington
- Founded: 1834
- Founded by: Joseph Cone
- Named after: Farmington, Connecticut

Government
  - Mayor: Kenn Stufflebeam

Area
  - Total: 1.51 sq mi (3.90 km^{2})
  - Land: 1.51 sq mi (3.90 km^{2})
  - Water: 0 sq mi (0.00 km^{2})
- Elevation: 742 ft (226 m)

Population (2020)
  - Total: 2,389
  - Estimate (2024): 2,295
  - Density: 1,586.9/sq mi (612.69/km^{2})
- Time zone: UTC-6 (CST)
  - Summer (DST): UTC-5 (CDT)
- ZIP Code(s): 61531
- Area code: 309
- FIPS code: 17-25531
- GNIS ID: 2394746
- Wikimedia Commons: Farmington, Illinois
- Website: www.cityoffarmingtonil.com

Farmington is a city in Fulton County and Peoria County, Illinois, United States. It is north of Canton, west of Peoria, southeast of Galesburg, and northeast of Macomb. The population was 2,389 at the 2020 census. The public school system is Farmington Central Community Unit School District 265, which includes Farmington Central High School. Because it is in Fulton County & Peoria County, it is a part of the Canton Micropolitan Area and the wider Peoria Consolidated Statistical Area.

== History ==
Farmington was founded in 1834, with its post office being established on January 6, 1836. The area was first inhabited by members of the Potawatomi tribe. The city is named after Farmington, Connecticut.

Before and during the Civil War, the city was involved in the Underground Railroad, and there are several remaining homes that were safehouses. In the early 1900s, many Italian immigrants settled in Farmington.

== Geography ==
Farmington is located in the northeast corner of Fulton County. Illinois Routes 78 and 116 pass through the center of the city. IL 116 enters from the north as North Main Street, and IL 78 enters from the south as South Main Street. The two highways leave the city to the east on East Fort Street. IL 78 leads north 42 miles (68 km) to Kewanee and south 10 miles (16 km) to Canton, the largest city in Fulton County, while IL 116 leads east 22 miles (35 km) to Peoria and west 22 miles to St. Augustine.

According to the 2021 census gazetteer files, Farmington has a total area of 1.51 square miles (3.91 km^{2}), all land.

== Demographics ==
Historical population
Census	Pop.	Note	%±
1880	1,111		—
1890	1,375		23.8%
1900	1,729		25.7%
1910	2,421		40.0%
1920	2,631		8.7%
1930	2,269		−13.8%
1940	2,225		−1.9%
1950	2,651		19.1%
1960	2,831		6.8%
1970	2,959		4.5%
1980	3,118		5.4%
1990	2,535		−18.7%
2000	2,601		2.6%
2010	2,448		−5.9%
2020	2,389		−2.4%
U.S. Decennial Census

=== Racial and ethnic composition ===
Farmington city, Illinois – Racial and ethnic composition Note: the US Census treats Hispanic/Latino as an ethnic category. This table excludes Latinos from the racial categories and assigns them to a separate category. Hispanics/Latinos may be of any race.
Race / Ethnicity (NH = Non-Hispanic)	Pop 2000	Pop 2010	Pop 2020	% 2000	% 2010	% 2020
White alone (NH)	2,546	2,379	2,248	97.89%	97.18%	94.10%
Black or African American alone (NH)	3	9	4	0.12%	0.37%	0.17%
Native American or Alaska Native alone (NH)	9	9	4	0.35%	0.37%	0.17%
Asian alone (NH)	4	6	0	0.15%	0.25%	0.00%
Native Hawaiian or Pacific Islander alone (NH)	0	0	2	0.00%	0.00%	0.08%
Other race alone (NH)	0	2	5	0.00%	0.08%	0.21%
Mixed race or Multiracial (NH)	14	22	82	0.54%	0.90%	3.43%
Hispanic or Latino (any race)	25	21	44	0.96%	0.86%	1.84%
Total	2,601	2,448	2,389	100.00%	100.00%	100.00%

=== 2020 census ===
As of the 2020 census, Farmington had a population of 2,389. The population density was 1,587.38 inhabitants per square mile (612.89/km^{2}). There were 1,119 housing units at an average density of 743.52 per square mile (287.07/km^{2}).

The median age was 38.9 years. 24.2% of residents were under the age of 18 and 17.8% of residents were 65 years of age or older. For every 100 females there were 96.6 males, and for every 100 females age 18 and over there were 93.6 males age 18 and over.

0.0% of residents lived in urban areas, while 100.0% lived in rural areas.

There were 1,008 households in Farmington, of which 31.3% had children under the age of 18 living in them. Of all households, 45.0% were married-couple households, 18.3% were households with a male householder and no spouse or partner present, and 28.8% were households with a female householder and no spouse or partner present. About 31.2% of all households were made up of individuals and 16.8% had someone living alone who was 65 years of age or older.

There were 1,119 housing units, of which 9.9% were vacant. The homeowner vacancy rate was 2.9% and the rental vacancy rate was 10.6%.

=== Income and poverty ===
The median income for a household in the city was $51,335, and the median income for a family was $59,181. Males had a median income of $44,464 versus $31,548 for females. The per capita income for the city was $26,332. About 6.0% of families and 8.5% of the population were below the poverty line, including 3.8% of those under age 18 and 6.7% of those age 65 or over.

== Notable people ==
- Lewis Russell, actor born in Farmington
- Bill Tuttle, outfielder for the Detroit Tigers, Kansas City Athletics, and the Minnesota Twins
- Fred Venturelli, placekicker for the Chicago Bears, born in Farmington
