= Illinois Standards Achievement Test =

Former standardized test in Illinois, United States

The Illinois Standards Achievement Test (ISAT) measured individual student achievement based on the Illinois Learning Standards. The results of this score were applied to the No Child Left Behind Act, to identify failing schools. The ISAT was retired as a state assessment tool. The ISAT was last administered in the 2013–2014 school year.

== Test ==
According to the Illinois State Board of Education (through ISBE.net), this examination tested students in reading and math every year from grades 3–8. Students were tested in science in grades 4 and 7. The writing portion of the test was suspended in 2011 due to lack of funding.

The Illinois State Achievement Test reported out Lexile measures for students in grades 3–8. A Lexile measure can be used to match readers with targeted text and monitor growth in reading ability.
