= Abingdon-Avon High School =

Coordinates: 40.8003167°N 90.4070732°W

Location
- 600 W. Martin St; Abingdon, Illinois; United States

Information
- Type: Public secondary
- Motto: Educate every student every day.
- Established: 2013
- School district: 276
- Principal: Kristi Anderson
- Teaching staff: 21.46 (FTE)
- Grades: 9–12
- Enrollment: 277 (2023–2024)
- Student to teacher ratio: 12.91
- Campus: Small city
- Colors: Black, green and yellow
- Athletics: Co-ed Cross-Country, Football, Bowling, Boys Basketball, Girls Basketball, Volleyball, Baseball, Softball, Co-ed Track, Co-ed Soccer
- Mascot: Tornadoes
- Nickname: A-town
- Website: www.atown276.net/o/aahs

Abingdon-Avon High School, or AAHS, is a public four-year high school located in Abingdon, Illinois. AAHS is part of Abingdon-Avon Community Unit School District 276, which also includes Abingdon-Avon Middle School, and Hedding Elementary School, and Avon Elementary.

== Academics ==
Abingdon-Avon High School offers a comprehensive academic and vocational program. Students are required to take four years of English, three years of math, three years of science, three years of social studies, Consumer's Education, Driver's Education, Health, four years of Physical Education, and 9.5 credits of electives. Electives offered include; Spanish 1 - 3, Choir, Band, Agriculture, Industrial Arts, Art, Family and Consumer Science, Business, and Technology. In addition to the full array of course offerings in house, students have the opportunity to attend all of the courses offered at the Galesburg Area Vocational Center. In 2014 the school district began practicing "1:1 computing" by issuing each student an HP 14 Chromebook.

=== Required courses ===
Social science/ History Need 3.0 credits to graduate U.S. History I U.S History II U.S History III Government

Family and Consumer Science Need a .50 credit to graduate Resource management (consumer education)

Mathematics Need 3.0 credits to graduate Geometry

Science Need 3.0 credits to graduate

English Need 4.0 credits to graduate

Physical Education Need 3.5 credits to graduate (2019- forward) / 4.0 (2015–2018)

Driver’s Education Need a .50 credit to graduate

Health Education Need a .50 credit to graduate

== Athletics ==
Abingdon-Avon High School competes in the Lincoln Trail Conference and is a member school in the Illinois High School Association. Teams are stylized as the Tornadoes. In 2013, the Volleyball team reached the IHSA Class 2A Sweet Sixteen before falling to Fulton High School in the Farmington sectional. Also in 2013, the football team finished the regular season 7 - 2, advancing to the second round of the IHSA playoffs before falling to Ottawa Marquette High School. Abingdon-Avon High School is a part of the Prairieland Conference and offers co-ed cross-country, track, and bowling.

=== Football records ===
2013-14 8-3 2nd Round State Playoffs
2014-15 10-1 2nd Round State Playoffs
2015-16 3-6
2016-17 0-9
2017-18 7-3 1st Round State Playoffs

=== Volleyball records ===
2013-14 21-11 Regional Championship
2014-15 5-21-1
2015-16 6-20-1
2016-17 10-20
2017-18 10-20

=== Boys basketball records ===
2013-14 16-11
2014-15 17-13 Regional Championship
2015-16 11-14
2016-17 23-5

=== Girls basketball records ===
2013-14 17-13
2014-15 16-15 Regional Championship
2015-16 19-11
2016-17 17-13

=== Baseball records ===
2013-14 13-13
2014-15 28-7 Regional Championship
2015-16 27-4 Sectional Championship
2016-17 16-11 Sectional Championship

=== Softball records ===
2013-14 12-15
2015-16 14-15
2016-17 10-16 Regional Championship
