= Mercer County High School (Illinois) =

Location
- 1500 S. College Ave. Aledo, Illinois; USA
- 41.18955°N 90.74995°W

Information
- Type: Public secondary
- School district: Mercer County Community Unit School District 404
- Principal: Stacey Day
- Teaching staff: 30.90 (FTE)
- Grades: 9–12
- Enrollment: 401 (2023–2024)
- Student to teacher ratio: 12.98
- Campus: Small city
- Colors: Navy, Vegas gold and white
- Nickname: Golden Eagles
- Website: Mercer County High School

Mercer County High School, or MCHS, is a public four-year high school located at 1500 South College Avenue in Aledo, Illinois, a city in Mercer County, Illinois, in the Midwestern United States. MCHS is part of Mercer County Community Unit School District 404, which also includes Mercer County Junior High School, Mercer County Intermediate School, Apollo Elementary School, and New Boston Elementary School. The campus is located in Aledo, IL, 30 miles southwest of Moline, Illinois, and serves a mixed city, village, and rural residential community. The school is within the Davenport-Moline-Rock Island, IA-IL metropolitan statistical area.

== Academics ==
=== Aledo-Westmer Academics ===
For academic year ending 2009, both Aledo High School and Westmer High School were Fully Recognized by the state for making yearly progress and adhering to state testing and standards. In 2009, 62% of Westmer High School students tested met or exceeded standards, and 56% of Aledo High School students met or exceeded standards. Westmer High School made Adequate Yearly Progress in 2009 on the Prairie State Achievement Examination, a state test that is part of the No Child Left Behind Act; whereas Aledo High School did not make Adequate Yearly Progress. Aledo High School's average high school graduation rate between 1999 and 2009 was 99%, and Westmer's was 91%. Westmer High School enrollment decreased from 207 to 140 (32%) in the period of 2000–2009, and Aledo High School enrollment decreased from 344 to 287 (17%).

=== Mercer County ===
Two awards have been given to schools in our district by the Illinois State Board of Education. The Academic Excellence Award has been given to Apollo Elementary and the Spotlight Schools Award has been given to New Boston Elementary.

== Athletics ==
Mercer County High School Three Rivers Conference (Illinois) and is a member school in the Illinois High School Association. Aledo Mercer County High School has won 5 state championships, 4 in Boys' Football (1998, 2001, 2002, AND 2012), and 1 in Boys' Golf (1984).

== History ==
Aledo High School and Westmer High School consolidated in 2009. Westmer High School was formed by the consolidation of Joy, Keithsburg, and New Boston High Schools in 1960.

=== Aledo High School ===
Aledo residents began offering educational opportunities to their children in the mid-19th century. Aledo High School was established during the later years of the Aledo Academy, a university-preparatory school which ran from 1874 to 1893, and in turn contributed to the latter school's demise. In Eric Long's research of the academy, "... the Aledo Academy did its duty as a fine school until the Aledo High School became an academically stronger institution." This took place during the late 1880s to early 1890s. Aledo High School served the community through 2009. It was in 2008 and 2009 that Aledo residents, and residents whose children attended nearby Joy Westmer High School, began researching a possibility of consolidating their efforts. This decision was agreed upon by both sides and finalized in 2008. The 2008–09 school year would be the final one for the school known as the Aledo High School "Green Dragons". Beginning with the 2009–10 school year, Aledo High School will now be known as the Mercer County High School "Golden Eagles". Mercer County High School will hold classes in Aledo at the former Aledo High School building.

=== Westmer High School ===
Joy, Keithsburg, and New Boston each supported their own high school from the early 20th century through the 1959–60 school year. It was in the spring of 1960 the decision was made to merge the educational resources of these three towns, and of nearby Eliza, to create a new district. Beginning with the 1960–61 school year the new school district was in effect. Since all towns involved in this merger were located in the western portion of Mercer County, a unique name emerged for the district. It was appropriately named the Westmer School District. The high school was situated at a location that gave it an address in Joy, Illinois. Westmer High School existed through the 2008–09 school year. Consolidation talks with nearby Aledo had been on-going for several years. In the fall of 2008 the voters of Aledo and Westmer agreed to support a consolidation effort between the two schools. The spring of 2009 would be the last for Westmer High School, and for Aledo High School, as the previous 49 years had known them. The new district was named the Mercer County School District. The high school is located in Aledo. The former Westmer High School facility is now utilized as the Mercer County Junior High School for 7th and 8th grades.

==== Joy High School ====
Joy High School opened in the early 20th century. Prior to that, the village of Joy was laid out in 1869 and a one-room school house was built that same year on the site of today's Joy Park. School was held from September to March with a vacation during corn-picking time. It reopened in April for a three-month summer term. It was not unusual for some of the students to be 21 years old. Only the basic subjects were taught. In 1896 a two-story brick building was built in the Joy Park location. The first floor was used as a grade school and a high school was located on the second floor. An addition was built on the north side of the building in 1906. There were four graduates in the first commencement exercise in 1899 and six graduates in 1900. There were no graduates in 1901–03, or in 1909. The largest class had 37 students graduate in 1956. There were 26 students in the last graduating class of Joy High School in 1960. A new high school was built on the north edge of Joy in 1936–37. The original Joy High School doubled as a church until a new building was built in 1937. Students were relocated from the second floor of the high school in Joy Park to the new facility during the Christmas Vacation in 1937. The District was then reorganized and became the Westmer School District beginning in the fall of 1960. In 1960 a consolidation effort between the schools and communities of western Mercer County, including New Boston and Keithsburg, took place. Joy was included in this effort and was fortunate to land the high school in their town.

==== Keithsburg High School ====
Keithsburg High School opened in the late 19th century. Keithsburg is named after its founder, Robert Keith. He also donated the first-ever building for a school to the town, so long as it was used for school purposes around 1850 to 1855. As that wasn't followed through, the building and offer were withdrawn. Another building was erected in 1856, and the main part of that was used, with an addition to it in 1882. A new Keithsburg School building was constructed in 1885. It is believed this building served as the only building for grades 1–12 prior to the construction of a new building in 1928. This building continued to serve as the grade Keithsburg Grade School through 1960. It was likely torn down shortly after its closure. Keithsburg High School was constructed in 1928, and served as the local high school until the Keithsburg school district consolidated with the western Mercer County districts serving the towns of Joy, New Boston, and Eliza, and formed the Westmer School District in 1960. A new high school, Westmer, came from this effort and was located in nearby Joy.
