= Big Rivers Conference (Illinois) =

- Conference: IHSA
- Founded: 1999
- Folded: 2012
- Sports fielded: football
- No. of teams: 10
- Region: Northwest and North-central portions of Illinois

The Big Rivers Conference of Illinois was a high school football-exclusive athletic conference that existed from the 1999 through the 2012 football season. Upon its dissolution, it comprised ten teams (eight schools competing independently and two athletic co-operatives) located in the northwest and north-central portions of the state. It was a member of the Illinois High School Association, and its sister conference for other sports was the Three Rivers Conference. As of the 2013–14 school year, in tandem with a conference expansion, Big Rivers has been reabsorbed into the Three Rivers Conference. This expansion negotiated full membership status for member schools in all Three Rivers Conference sports (with co-operatives existing for some sports and not every school necessarily fielding a team in every sport offered), thereby negating the need for a football conference carve-out.

== About ==
The Big Rivers was a successful smaller-school football conference, having produced state championships in five of the past nine seasons. In its last year of existence as Big Rivers (2012–13), the conference consisted of Amboy, Bureau Valley, Erie, Fulton, Kewanee, Morrison, Newman Central Catholic, and Riverdale High Schools, all belonging to the Three Rivers Athletic Conference; Hall High School from the North Central Illinois Conference, Lincoln Division; and St. Bede Academy from the Tri-County Conference. Amboy and Erie both had (and will continue to operate) football co-operatives with La Moille High School of the Little Ten Conference and fellow Three Rivers Conference member Prophetstown High School, respectively. According to the Illinois High School Association, the average football enrollment for member schools in 2012-13 (including multipliers and based on 2011-12 school-year data) was 388.

== History ==
The Three Rivers Conference, remaining active in other sports, dropped football from its athletic offerings from 1999 until the 2013–14 school year. In the football season just prior to this hiatus, Three Rivers' football programs included Amboy High School, Erie High School, Fulton High School, Morrison High School, Newman Central Catholic High School, Prophetstown High School, Riverdale High School, and Savanna High School (now West Carroll High School). In 1999, Amboy joined the ranks of Tri-County Conference schools St. Bede Academy, Bureau Valley High School, Marquette High School, Eureka High School, and Bradford High School (now Stark County High School) — who was part of a football co-operative with Midland High School and Henry-Senachwine High School — to make up the newly formed Big Rivers' Conference's Illinois Division. The inaugural Mississippi Division consisted of former Three Rivers schools Morrison, Newman, Riverdale, Fulton, Erie, and Prophetstown. Savanna opted to switch to the Upstate Illini Conference, presently known as the Northwest Upstate Illini Conference, for all sports.

After the 2000–01 school year, Bradford High School was shuttered. Their football co-operative relocated to Midland High School in Varna and named the Marshall County Falcons. After one season, the Falcons renamed their co-operative the River Valley Timberwolves. They remained at Midland High School and Varna. Erie and Prophetstown consolidated their football programs, leaving an open spot in the Mississippi Division which was filled by Amboy. Amboy's spot in the Illinois Division was taken by a football co-operative at La Moille High School. La Moille only lasted one season in the Big Rivers before disbanding their football program altogether for one season, and then forming a co-operative with Amboy the following year. The Illinois Division continued with five teams for the next two seasons.

After the 2003–04 school year, Eureka formed a co-operative with Roanoke-Benson High School and joined the Corn Belt Conference. The reduction in the conference to ten teams prompted the Big Rivers to eliminate divisions and function as a ten team conference with no non-conference schedule.

In 2008, Kewanee High School agreed to leave the North Central Illinois Conference and join the Big Rivers Conference for football and the Three Rivers Conference for all other sports. They played their first season in the Big Rivers in 2010, replacing River Valley Coop, who left to play in the Lincoln Trail Conference.

In 2011, Ottawa Marquette, at the time a member of the Tri-County Conference, announced they were moving their football program to the Northeastern Athletic Conference for the 2012–13 academic year. The Spring Valley Hall Red Devils replaced Marquette in the Big Rivers' final season as a football-only, stand-alone conference.

The Three Rivers Conference includes football for the first time since 1998 beginning with the 2013–14 school year, in conjunction with an expansion of member schools.

== Achievements ==
The 2004 football season was notable for two Big Rivers' teams playing for state titles. Newman Central Catholic won the league's first state crown by defeating Carthage 21–7 in 2A, while Bureau Valley lost to Driscoll in 3A. Bureau Valley won the 3A state championship the following season, highlighting a stretch that included six conference championships, three undefeated regular seasons, and two state title appearances in seven years.

In 2009, the Morrison Mustangs brought the Big Rivers back to a state playoff title game, winning class 2A and becoming the second 14-0 state championship in conference history. Newman matched this feat in 2010, capping a perfect 14–0 season by capturing the 2A championship trophy. A second Morrison state title in 2011 gave the Big Rivers Conference a three-year lock on the IHSA class 2A football crown, and marked the culmination of a two-year, post-season escalation of an already intense football rivalry with Newman.

== Expansion and dissolution ==
In early 2012, it was announced that Orion, Rockridge, Sherrard, all former members of the West Central Conference, and Princeton accepted an invitation to join the Three Rivers Conference at the start of the 2013–14 school year. These four schools, along with Hall, Kewanee, and St. Bede Academy make up the seven teams in the newly created South division. The North division includes Amboy-La Moille, Bureau Valley, Erie-Prophetstown, Fulton, Morrison, Newman Central Catholic, and Riverdale. The decision to create a geographical north–south alignment was based upon a desire to maintain existing rivalries and minimize travel times.

The football schedule includes six intra-divisional games and three rotating inter-divisional, cross-over match-ups. Each division will award a conference champion. With this most recent expansion, the Big Rivers name has been dropped because the Big Rivers Conference and the Three Rivers Conference, co-operatives excepted, now consist of the same member schools, thus eliminating the need for a separate football conference designation.

== Conference Champions ==
- 1999 Big Rivers Illinois Division: St. Bede 6-3 (5–0)
- 1999 Big Rivers Mississippi Division: Newman 9-0 (5–0)
- 2000 Big Rivers Illinois Division: Amboy 6-3 (5–0)
- 2000 Big Rivers Mississippi Division: Fulton 9-0 (5–0)
- 2001 Big Rivers Illinois Division: St. Bede 7-2 (5–0)
- 2001 Big Rivers Mississippi Division: Fulton 9-0 (5–0)
- 2002 Big Rivers Illinois Division: Bureau Valley 8-1 (3–1)
- 2002 Big Rivers Mississippi Division: Fulton 7-2 (4–1)
- 2003 Big Rivers Illinois Division: Bureau Valley 8-1 (3–1)
- 2003 Big Rivers Mississippi Division: Newman 8-1 (4–1)
- 2004 Big Rivers: Bureau Valley 9-0 (9–0)
- 2005 Big Rivers: Bureau Valley 9-0 (9–0)
- 2006 Big Rivers: Bureau Valley 9-0 (9–0)
- 2007 Big Rivers: Morrison 9-0 (9–0)
- 2008 Big Rivers: Bureau Valley 8-1 (8–1)
- 2009 Big Rivers: Morrison 9-0 (9–0)
- 2010 Big Rivers: Newman 9-0 (9–0)
- 2011 Big Rivers: Newman 8-1 (8–1)
- 2012 Big Rivers: Newman 9-0 (9–0)

== State Championships and Runners-Up ==
- 2004 2A Champion: Newman Central Catholic
- 2005 3A Champion: Bureau Valley
- 2009 2A Champion: Morrison
- 2010 2A Champion: Newman Central Catholic
- 2011 2A Champion: Morrison
- 2004 3A Runner-Up: Bureau Valley

2013 2A Champion : Newman Central Catholic

== Members as of 2012-13 (Final year of existence as Big Rivers) ==
School	Nickname	Colors	Location
Amboy High School (Amboy-La Moille Co-operative)	Clippers		Amboy, IL
Bureau Valley High School	Storm		Manlius, IL
Erie High School (Erie-Prophetstown Co-operative)	Panthers		Erie, IL
Fulton High School	Steamers		Fulton, IL
Hall High School	Red Devils		Spring Valley, IL
Kewanee High School	Boilermakers		Kewanee, IL
Morrison High School	Mustangs		Morrison, IL
Newman Central Catholic High School	Comets		Sterling, IL
Riverdale High School	Rams		Port Byron, IL
St. Bede Academy	Bruins		Peru, IL
