= Three Rivers Conference (Illinois) =

High school sports conference in Illinois, US

- Conference: IHSA
- No. of teams: 14
- Region: Northwest Illinois

Locations
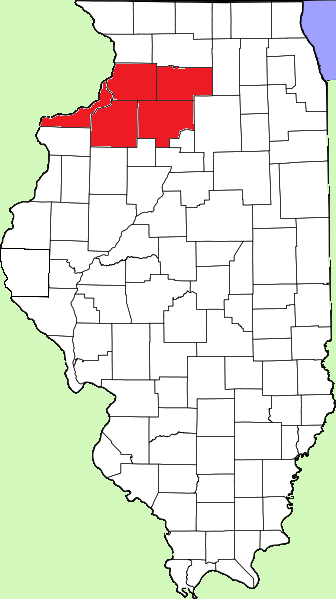
- The Three Rivers Conference within Illinois

The Three Rivers Athletic Conference, also known as the TRAC-8, is a high school conference in northwest Illinois. The conference participates in athletics and activities in the Illinois High School Association. The conference comprises small public, and two private, high schools with enrollments between 200-600 students in portions of Bureau, Henry, Lee, Mercer, Rock Island, Warren, and Whiteside counties.

== Current Membership ==
School	Location	Mascot	Colors	Year Joined	IHSA Classes 2/3/4	IHSA Music Class	IHSA Football Class	IHSA Cross Country Class	IHSA Cheerleading Class
Erie-Prophetstown Co-op	Erie, IL	Panthers	Red, White, Black	1975 (Consolidation in 2018)	1A/2A	B	3A	1A	Small squad
Hall High School (Illinois)	Spring Valley, IL	Red Devils	Red, Black, White	2013	1A/2A	B	2A	1A	Small squad
Kewanee; High School	Kewanee, IL	Boilermakers	Orange, Black	2010	1A/2A	B	3A	1A	Small squad
Mendota; High School	Mendota, IL	Trojans	Purple, Gold	2021	1A/2A	B	3A	1A	Small squad
Mercer County High School	Aledo, IL	Golden Eagles	Gold, Navy, White	2024	1A/2A	B	1A	1A	Small Squad
Monmouth-Roseville High School	Monmouth, IL	Titans	Navy Blue, Silver, White	2021 (2016 football)	1A/2A	B	3A	1A	Small squad
Newman Central Catholic; High School	Sterling, IL	Comets	Blue, White Gray	1975	1A/2A	B	2A	1A	Small squad
Orion High School	Orion, IL	Chargers	Black, Red	2013	1A/2A	B	2A	1A	Small squad
Princeton High School	Princeton, IL	Tigers	Blue, Gray	2013	1A/2A	B	3A	1A	Small squad
Riverdale; High School	Port Byron, IL	Rams	Black, Gold	1975	1A/2A	B	2A	1A	Small squad
Sherrard High School	Sherrard, IL	Tigers	Purple, Gold	2013	1A/2A	B	3A	1A	Small squad
Rockridge High School	Taylor Ridge, IL	Rockets	Maroon, Gray	2013	1A/2A	B	2A	1A	Small squad

Sources:IHSA Conferences, IHSA Coop Teams, and IHSA Member Schools Directory

== History ==
The Three Rivers Conference formed in 1975, and was largely the result of the dissolution of two conferences that had also included high schools in Iowa. Fulton, Morrison, Riverdale, Savanna and Sterling Newman had been part of the Illowa Conference along with Iowa schools North Scott of Eldridge, Central Clinton of De Witt, and St. Mary's High School of Clinton. Erie and Prophetstown were members of a league with the Iowa-based Pleasant Valley, Camanche and Northeast of Goose Lake. The seven Illinois schools joined with Amboy to form the new TRAC-8 conference.

Throughout the conference's history, alignment changes included the departure of Savanna, which went on to join the Northwest Upstate Illini Conference, and the additions of Bureau Valley in the mid-1990s and Kewanee in 2010. Upon the addition of Kewanee, the league became known as the TRAC-9. In addition, Erie and Prophetstown formed a cooperative to share certain sports programs, including football and wrestling.

On January 12, 2012 the conference approved expansion for six schools to join the league beginning in the 2013-14 school year. Included in the expansion are Orion, Rockridge, Sherrard, Princeton, St. Bede Academy of Peru and Spring Valley Hall. The six additions make the Three Rivers a 15-team league, one of the largest in Illinois. The conference will be split into two divisions, with Interstate 80 being the dividing line.

Following the 2015-16 school year, Amboy left the conference and joined the Northwest Upstate Illini Conference for the 2016-17 school year. Following the 2021 season, Fulton also left to join the Northwest Upstate Illini Conference, however, Mendota and Monmouth-Roseville, who had been playing football within the conference since 2016, joined the conference fully as their replacement.

Current members Erie-Prophetstown, Kewanee, Hall, Mendota, Mercer County, Monmouth-Roseville, Orion, Princeton, Riverdale, Rockridge, Sherrard, and Sterling Newman Central Catholic. The divisions in the conference are geographically set, except for football where they are set by school size.

- The Small School Division (football only) includes: Erie-Prophetstown, Mercer County, Newman Central Catholic, Orion, Riverdale, and Rockridge.
- The Big School Division (football only) includes: Hall, Kewanee, Mendota, Monmouth-Roseville, Princeton, and Sherrard.
- The East Division (all other athletics) includes: Erie-Prophetstown, Hall, Kewanee, Mendota, Newman Central Catholic, and Princeton.
- The West Division (all other athletics) includes: Mercer County, Monmouth-Roseville, Orion, Riverdale, Rockridge, and Sherrard.

In 2024, Morrison is the third team from the conference to migrate to the Northwest Upstate Illini Conference, joining Amboy and Fulton. This move, however will refresh the rivalry between Fulton and Morrison, the Battle for the Wooden Shoe. Along with Morrison's departure, Bureau Valley also chose to join the Lincoln Trail Conference and leave the TRAC.

=== Football ===
The Three Rivers Conference dropped football from 1999 until the 2013-14 school year. During this hiatus, the league offered championships in other sports, and member schools, either independently or as part of a co-operative, participated in the football-exclusive Big Rivers Conference.

In early 2012, it was announced that Orion, Rockridge, Sherrard, all former members of the Olympic Conference, and Princeton accepted an invitation for full membership in the Three Rivers Conference at the start of the 2013-14 school year. These four schools, along with Hall, Kewanee, and St. Bede Academy make up the seven teams in the newly created South Division. The North Division includes Amboy-La Moille, Bureau Valley, Erie-Prophetstown, Fulton, Morrison, Newman Central Catholic, and Riverdale. The decision to create a geographical North-South alignment was based upon a desire to maintain existing rivalries and minimize travel times.

The football schedule includes six intra-divisional games and three rotating inter-divisional cross-over match-ups. Each division will award a conference champion. Because the Big Rivers Conference and the Three Rivers Conference, co-operatives excepted, consist of the same member schools with this most recent expansion, the decision was made to drop the Big Rivers name in favor of the longer-standing Three Rivers Conference.

See the Big Rivers Conference article for information about its history, achievements, and participating schools.

=== Previous Members ===
School	Location	Mascot	Colors	Year joined	Previous conference	Year left	New conference	Consolidations
Amboy High School	Amboy	Clippers		1975	SHARK	2016	Northwest Upstate Illini	n/a
Bureau County High School	Manlius	Stormy		1999	Tri-County	2024	Lincoln Trail	n/a
Erie High School	Erie	Cardinals		1975	Bi-State	2018*	none (Co-op with Prophetstown)	n/a
Fulton High School	Fulton	Steamers		1975	Illowa	2021	Northwest Upstate Illini	added some Albany (1944)
Morrison High School	Morrison	Mustangs		1975	Illowa	2024	Northwest Upstate Illini	n/a
Prophetstown High School	Prophetstown	Prophets		1975	Bi-State	2018*	none (Co-op with Erie)	added Lyndon (1969) added Tampico (1996)
Savanna High School	Savanna	Indians		1975	Illowa	1998	n/a	Consolidated with Mt Carroll and Thompson to form West Carroll (2005)

=== Membership timeline ===
Prior to the development of the TRAC-8, the IHSA was pushing teams to end multi-state conferences. Therefore, Fulton, Morrison, Riverdale, Savanna and Newman came from the dissolved Illowa Conference, Amboy left the Wisconsin-Illinois SHARK Conference and Erie and Prophetstown, then competing as individual high schools, left the Iowa-Illinois Pleasant Valley Conference.

From 1999 to 2012, the TRAC-8 dropped football from the conference. In order to maintain competition, the teams from the Three Rivers' football programs including: Amboy, Erie, Fulton, Morrison, Sterling Newman, Prophetstown, Riverdale, and Savanna joined the ranks of Tri-County Conference schools Peru St. Bede, Bureau Valley, Ottawa Marquette, Eureka, and Bradford (now Stark County High School) to make up the newly formed Big Rivers Conference's Illinois Division.

Full members Upstate Illini Conference North Central Illinois Conference Olympic Conference Northwest Upstate Illini Conference Tri-County Conference Big Northern Conference

== Competitive Success ==
The Three Rivers Conference has won 11 state championships in IHSA sponsored athletics and activities, 16 if wins by member schools participating in the Big Rivers Conference are counted.

=== State Champions ===
Boys Golf

- Riverdale (2017 1A)

Boys Track

- Newman Central Catholic (2012-2013 1A)

Boys Cross Country

- Newman Central Catholic (2009-2010 1A)

Girls Cross Country

Boys Football

- Amboy (1984-85 2A)
- Bureau Valley (2005-2006 3A)*
- Fulton (1976-1977 2A)
- Fulton (1991-1992 2A)
- Hall (1995-1996 3A)**
- Hall (2001-2002 3A)**
- Morrison (2009-2010 2A)*
- Morrison (2011-2012 2A)*
- Newman Central Catholic (1990-1991 1A)
- Newman Central Catholic (1994-1995 1A)
- Newman Central Catholic (2004-2005 2A)*
- Newman Central Catholic (2010-2011 2A)*
- Newman Central Catholic (2013-2014 2A)*
- Newman Central Catholic (2019-2020 2A)*

* Participating in Big Rivers Conference **Participating in NCIC

Boys Wrestling

- Newman Central Catholic (2010-2011 1A)
- Newman Central Catholic (1984-1985 A)
- Savanna (1976-1977 A)
- Savanna (1978-1979 A)
- Savanna (1979-1980 A)
- Savanna (1981-1982 A)

Softball

- Morrison (2010-2011 2A)
- Rockridge (2017-2018 2A)
- Rockridge (2020-2021 2A)
- Rockridge (2021-2022 2A)
- Rockridge (2022-2023 2A)
