= Michigan Promise Scholarship =

Michigan Promise Scholarship logo

The Michigan Promise Scholarship was a merit-based scholarship program in the state of Michigan that provided up to $4,000 towards post-secondary education at any approved Michigan institution to qualifying Michigan high school graduates. The full amount was reserved for students attending at least two-year programs.

== History ==
Michigan Merit Award logo

In 1999, Michigan legislature enacted in Public Act 94 the Michigan Merit Award. Designed to benefit graduating seniors between 2000 and 2006, it granted up to $3,000.00 to students who performed exceptionally well on the Michigan Educational Assessment Program tests. On December 21, 2006, Governor Granholm signed Public Act 479 establishing the Michigan Promise Scholarship to replace that award.

== Eligibility ==
Students were eligible to receive the scholarship if they had taken the entire Michigan Merit Examination (MME) in their junior or senior year of high school and received at least a score of Level 1 or Level 2 on all components. The scholarship was dispersed in installments, with $1,000.00 available at the start of each of the first and second years and the balance payable after completion of the second year. In order to maintain eligibility, a student's GPA at the approved institution couldn't drop below 2.5. If the program a student attended didn't assign grades, the student had to provide proof of having successfully completed the program.

== Current State ==
The State of Michigan discontinued the Michigan Promise Scholarship until further notice due to lack of funding.
