= Mark Johnson (American football) =

American football player (born 1953)

No. 50, 58
- Positions: Defensive end, Linebacker

Personal information
- Born: August 14, 1953 (age 73); Moline, Illinois, U.S.
- Listed height: 6 ft 2 in (1.88 m)
- Listed weight: 240 lb (109 kg)

Career information
- High school: Riverdale (Port Byron, Illinois)
- College: Missouri
- NFL draft: 1975: 12th round, 305th overall pick

Career history
- Buffalo Bills (1975–1976); Cleveland Browns (1977)

Career NFL statistics
- Games played: 31
- Stats at Pro Football Reference

Mark Steven Johnson (born August 14, 1953) is an American former professional football player who was a defensive end and linebacker for the Buffalo Bills and Cleveland Browns of the National Football League (NFL). He played college football for the Missouri Tigers.
