= Riverdale High School (Illinois) =

Comprehensive public high school in Port Byron, Rock Island County, Illinois, USA

Location
- 9622 256th Street North; Port Byron, Rock Island County, Illinois 61275; USA; 41°37′3.0″N 90°16′6.5″W

Information
- Type: Comprehensive Public High School
- Established: 1955
- School district: Riverdale Community Unit School District 100
- Principal: Keith Stewart
- Teaching staff: 25.25 (FTE)
- Grades: 9–12
- Enrollment: 308 (2023–2024)
- Average class size: 15
- Student to teacher ratio: 12.20
- Campus type: Rural
- Colors: Black, yellow
- Athletics conference: Three Rivers
- Team name: Rams
- Feeder schools: Riverdale Middle School, Riverdale Elementary School
- Website: Riverdale High School Website

Riverdale High School (RHS) is a public four-year high school located at 9622 256th Street North in Port Byron, a village in Rock Island County, Illinois, in the Midwestern United States. RHS is part of Riverdale Community Unit School District 100, which also includes Riverdale Middle School and Riverdale Elementary School. The campus is located 3 miles east of Port Byron, 13 miles northeast of East Moline, and serves a mixed village and rural residential community. The school is a short commute to the Quad Cities and part of the Davenport-Moline-Rock Island, Iowa-metropolitan statistical area.

== Academics ==
Riverdale High School is currently fully recognized by the state for making yearly progress and remaining in compliance with testing and standards. In 2009, 52% of students tested met or exceeded standards. RHS did not make Adequate Yearly Progress in 2009 on the Prairie State Achievement Examination, a state test that is part of the No Child Left Behind Act. The school's average high school graduation rate between 1999-2009 was 90%. School enrollment decreased from 443 to 371 (16%) in the period of 1999-2009.

In 2009, the faculty was 76 teachers, averaging 16.9 years of experience, of whom 27% held an advanced degree. The average class size was 16.8. The student to faculty ratio was 15.9. The district's instructional expenditure per student was $5,074.

In 2023, the faculty was 25 teachers, with 334 students in attendance. The school's average high school graduation rate as of this year is 99%. 80% of students participate in an extracurricular, with 60% of students participating in more than one. The school recognizes seven Illinois State Scholars on average per year.

== Athletics ==
Riverdale High School competes in the Three Rivers Conference and is a member school of the Illinois High School Association. Its mascot is the Rams. The school has won 1st place in IHSA state golf in 2017, 2nd place in 2018, and a 2nd place finish in 2023.

== History ==
Riverdale High School was created in 1955 with the consolidation of high schools in Cordova, Hillsdale and Port Byron.

Cordova High School opened in 1887. The origin of the high school was in 1887 when the high school curriculum was established. A booklet titled "Cordova High School: The Spirit Survives!", written in 2000, showed the spirit of the Cordova "kids" lives on to this day. The school began in 1887 and the last class graduated in 1955 after which there was a consolidation of several area schools that became Riverdale Unit #100 based in Port Byron. The original Cordova High School was in a two-story stone building that was used as both a grade school and high school. This building contained four rooms. The site of the demolished building in 2006 was the site of the original school, though the building that existed there in 2006 was not the original. In 1920, the building's upper floors were declared unsafe and classes were moved to the Methodist Church in Cordova. The same year, financing for a new high school building was approved. Construction began on a new building in October 1921 and was completed in August 1922. The building remained as the Cordova High School building until the school closed in 1955. At some point, at the site of the original building, a new building was erected as a grade school. Records are unsure of the actual date of this construction but it continued to be used through the consolidation of 1955. It was closed due to new construction at what is now known as the Riverdale Elementary Building. This grade school building was purchased and used as a restaurant known as the "Cordova Landing" for many years. The building was eventually sold and sat empty for several years. The Village of Cordova eventually took possession of the building and had it torn down early in spring 2006. When the Cordova High School building used from 1922 through 1955 was closed, it was never again used in any capacity and it was demolished in the late 1960s. The property on which this building sat was turned into a housing addition.

Hillsdale High School opened in 1921. In 1955, residents took part in a consolidation effort with the neighboring towns and school districts of Cordova and Port Byron and Hillsdale High School was deactivated when the new school district known as "Riverdale" was born. The children of Hillsdale now attend high school in a building on the outskirts of nearby Port Byron.

Port Byron High opened in the late 19th century or early 20th century. Port Byron High School consolidated with Cordova and Hillsdale High Schools in 1955 to form Riverdale High School. The Port Byron High School building served as the "new" Riverdale High School building until 1967, when a new building was constructed between the towns of Port Byron and Hillsdale. The Port Byron High School Building is still standing, used now as a business called Commercial Towel Service. The building was recently determined to be structurally sound and a prime property for lofts overlooking the Mississippi River. The Port Byron Riverdale HS has been torn down.

== Notable alumni ==
- Mark Johnson, professional NFL player
