= Orion High School =

- Orion High School Chargers

Location
- 1103 13th St. Orion, Henry County, Illinois 61273; USA
- 41.353361°N 90.366020°W

Information
- Type: Comprehensive Public High School
- School district: Orion Community Unit School District 223
- Principal: Nathan DeBaillie
- Teaching staff: 19.45 (FTE)
- Grades: 9–12
- Enrollment: 294 (2023-2024)
- Student to teacher ratio: 15.12
- Campus type: Rural, fringe
- Colors: Scarlet, black
- Athletics conference: Three Rivers
- Mascot: The Charger
- PSAE average: 66%
- Newspaper: The Scarlet Ink
- Yearbook: Charger
- Feeder schools: Orion Middle School
- Website: Orion High School

Orion High School, or OHS, is a public four-year high school located at 1103 13th St. in Orion, Illinois, a village in Western Township of Henry County, Illinois, in the Midwestern United States. OHS is part of Orion Community Unit School District 223, which also includes Orion Middle School, and C. R. Hanna Elementary School. The campus is 11 miles south of Moline, Illinois and serves a mixed village and rural residential community. The school is the only high school in the village of Orion, a bedroom community of the Quad Cities and part of the Davenport–Moline–Rock Island, IA–IL metropolitan statistical area.

== Academics ==
Orion High School made Adequate Yearly Progress on the Prairie State Achievement Examination, a state test that is part of the No Child Left Behind Act. In 2009, 66% of students tested met or exceeded state standards. The school's average high school graduation rate between 2000 and 2009 was 94%.

Orion High School ranked third of 16 in Prairie State Achievement Examination scores compared to all public high schools in the surrounding Henry County, Rock Island County, and Mercer County, Illinois communities over a 3-year period from 2007 to 2009. Only Annawan High School and Geneseo High School scored better. Orion High School is 1 of 7 high schools in this group to make Adequate Yearly Progress as part of the No Child Left Behind Act.

As of 2016, the district's teaching faculty contains 67 teachers, of whom 37% hold an advanced degree. The average district class size is 20.0, with a student to faculty ratio of 16:1. The [district's] instructional expenditure per student is $5,547. Orion High School enrollment decreased from 376 to 342 (9%) in the period of 2000 to 2009.

The Orion Community Unit School District 223 was selected as one of 61 school districts in Illinois to be named a "Bright A+" Award Recipient for 2006. The award was based on those school districts with the highest academic performance in the state of Illinois, and designates the district as among the top 5% of all Illinois.

== Athletics and activities ==
Orion High School competes in the Three Rivers Conference and is a member school in the Illinois High School Association. Its mascot is the Charger, symbolized by an armored knight and horse carrying a shield and jousting lance. The school offers 15 varsity sports for men and women and has no state championships on record in team athletics.

== Consolidation talks ==
In 2009, district superintendent David Deets commented that the consolidation topic remained on the district's radar because of the economic challenges districts face. No formal conversations have been scheduled with any of the region's districts regarding consolidation. Before reorganization talks can even begin, feasibility studies must be completed, and then a committee of 10 would have to be formed to prepare a consolidation proposal. A public vote is required to authorize any proposal deemed acceptable by the districts involved. Deets acknowledged the process is long, there is much information to process, and that there are many other issues on the radar.

== Notable alumni ==
- Logan Lee, former college football defensive end for the Iowa Hawkeyes and is currently a defensive tackle for the Pittsburgh Steelers
