= Prophetstown High School =

High school in Illinois, United States

Location
- 310 West Riverside Drive; Prophetstown, Whiteside County, Illinois 61277; United States
- Coordinates: 41°40′32.5″N 89°56′21.8″W

Information
- Type: Comprehensive Public High School
- School district: Prophetstown-Lyndon-Tampico Community Unit School District 3
- Principal: Janet Barnhart
- Staff: 15.62 (FTE)
- Grades: 9–12
- Enrollment: 216 (2023-2024)
- Student to teacher ratio: 13.83
- Campus type: Small city
- Colors: Red, black
- Athletics conference: Three Rivers
- Mascot: Panther
- PSAE average: 67%
- Feeder schools: PLT Middle School
- Website: Prophetstown High School Website

Prophetstown High School, or PHS, is a public four-year high school located at 310 West Riverside Drive in Prophetstown, Illinois, a small city of Whiteside County, Illinois, in the Midwestern United States. PHS is part of Prophetstown-Lyndon-Tampico Community Unit School District 3, which serves the communities of Prophetstown, Lyndon, Tampico, Deer Grove, and Yorktown, and includes PLT Middle School, Prophetstown Elementary School, and Tampico Elementary School. The campus is 15 miles southwest of Sterling, Illinois. The school serves a mixed small city, village, and rural residential community. The school lies within the Sterling micropolitan statistical area.

== Academics ==
In 2009, Prophetstown High School made Adequate Yearly Progress, with 67% of students meeting standards, on the Prairie State Achievement Examination, a state test that is part of the No Child Left Behind Act. The school's average high school graduation rate between 1999 and 2009 was 85%.

Prophetstown High School students have the opportunity to earn college credit through Sauk Valley Community College. Junior and senior students also have the option of attending the Whiteside Area Career Center (WACC), one of 25 area career centers in Illinois providing technical training in the areas of Business and Related Technology, Consumer Service, Industrial Technology, Transportation Services and Work Experience Cooperative Education. Through a program with SVCC, students can go to WACC and receive up to 21 dual credits. Through an articulation agreement between PHS and SVCC students can earn credits at SVCC in business and computer classes.

== Athletics and activities ==
Prophetstown High School competes in the Three Rivers Conference and is a member school in the Illinois High School Association. Its mascot is the Panther. The school has no state championships on record in team athletics or activities. Prophetstown co-ops with neighboring Erie High School for most athletics.

Prophetstown High School offers competitive programs in the following sports:

- Baseball
- Basketball
- Cross country
- Football
- Golf
- Softball
- Swimming & Diving
- Track & Field
- Volleyball
- Wrestling

Prophetstown High School offers programs in the following activities:

- Art Club
- Band
- Cheerleading
- Chorus
- Future Farmers of America (FFA)
- Future Homemakers of America (FHA)
- Musical
- National Honors Society
- Power Club
- Scholastic Bowl
- Spirit Club
- Student Council
- Volleyball Club
- Yearbook

== History ==
Prophetstown High School consolidated with Lyndon High School in 1969. Lyndon-Prophetstown then consolidated with Tampico High School in 1996. The name of Prophetstown High School was maintained.

=== Lyndon High School ===
Lyndon's school system goes back to 1854. A two-story building was built in 1873. Another school was built sometime around the start of the 20th century and housed the high school until 1960, when the building above was built. This building is pictured to the right as well. Sometime in the late 1960s a consolidation effort was initiated with nearby Prophetstown High School. This effort became a reality in 1969. The gymnasium is still in use, as the home court for the Sterling Christian (located in Galt) Basketball teams.

When Lyndon and Prophetstown consolidated, the Lyndon High School closed after the 1968–1969 school year. The Lyndon High School then became the Lyndon Junior High School housing the 7th and 8th grade classes. The original Lyndon High School housed just the 6th grade classes. Prophetstown-Lyndon and Tampico consolidated beginning with the 1996–1997 school year. The schools in Lyndon then closed up completely.

=== Tampico High School ===
The history of Tampico Schools date back to 1874. Until 1912, the high school only had three grades. The brick building that housed TTHS for 75 years was built in 1921 and had 14 classrooms and a gymnasium. It was located near a railroad junction of the Hoople, Yorktown & Tampico Railroad and the Chicago, Burlington & Quincy Railroad. The first mentioned was abandoned in 1953. In 1967, there were 153 students enrolled at TTHS. In the 1980s, Tampico lost its main railroad, the Chicago, Burlington & Quincy route, that was the reason Tampico became a settlement like most other small towns. Declining enrollment and financial concerns led to the closing of Tampico High School in 1996. The 1921 brick building was torn down during the summer of 2012 as part of a district wide facility improvement plan.. As of 2021, the old football field is still there, along with the padded hitting machine which is now rusted. The track outside of the field is still there in dirt form. High School students from Tampico now attend Prophetstown High School, twelve miles to the northwest.

== Notable alumni ==
- Bret Bielema, football coach
- Jack Heflin, professional football player
