= Rockridge High School =

School in Taylor Ridge, Illinois, United States

Location
- 14110 134th Avenue West; Taylor Ridge, Illinois 61284; United States; 41°23′12″N 90°45′58″W

Information
- Type: Public secondary
- School district: Rockridge Community Unit School District 300
- Principal: Sara Baker
- Staff: 25.97 (FTE)
- Grades: 9–12
- Enrollment: 328 (2023-2024)
- Student to teacher ratio: 12.63
- Campus: Rural
- Colors: Maroon and white
- Nickname: Rockets
- Website: School website

Rockridge High School, or RHS, is a public four-year high school located at 14110 134th Avenue West in Taylor Ridge, Illinois, an unincorporated area in Rock Island County, Illinois, in the Midwestern United States. RHS is part of Rockridge Community Unit School District 300, which also includes Rockridge Junior High School, Andalusia Elementary School, Illinois City Elementary School, and Taylor Ridge Elementary School. The campus is located in Edgington, IL, 15 miles southwest of Milan, Illinois, and serves a mixed village and rural residential community. The school is short commute to the Quad Cities and part of the Davenport-Moline-Rock Island, IA-IL metropolitan statistical area.

== Academics ==
Rockridge High School has been identified for Academic Early Warning Status. In 2009, 15% of students tested met or exceeded standards. RHS did not make Adequate Yearly Progress in 2009 on the Prairie State Achievement Examination, a state test that is part of the No Child Left Behind Act. The school's average high school graduation rate between 2000-2009 was 94%. School enrollment decreased from 477 to 442 (7%) in the period of 2000-2009.

The facility has consisted of roughly 88 teachers, averaging 14.0 years of experience, and of whom 47% have held an advanced degree. The average class size has been 19.0. The student to faculty ratio has been 15.5. The district's instructional expenditure per student was $5,170.

== Athletics ==
Rockridge High School has completed in the Three Rivers Conference (Illinois) and is a member school in the Illinois High School Association. Its mascot is the Rocket. The school has 9 state championships on record in team athletics and activities: Boys football (1994-1995 2A), 2 Boys Wrestling (1986-1987 A, 1989-1990 A), 5 Girls Softball (2004-2005 A, 2017-18 2A, 2020-2021 2A, 2021-2022 2A, 2022-2023 2A), Scholastic Bowl (1991-1992 A).

== Notable alumni ==
- Ethan Happ, basketball player
