= John R. Huizenga =

American nuclear physicist (1921–2014)

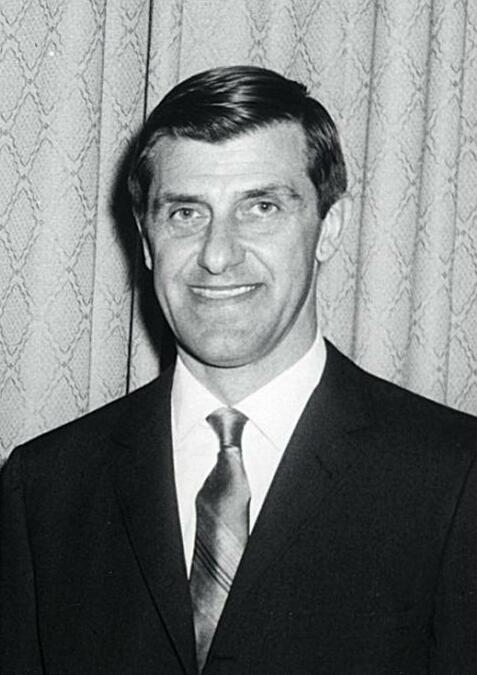
- Huizenga in 1966
- Born: John Robert Huizenga; April 21, 1921; Nr. Fulton, Illinois, U.S.
- Died: January 25, 2014 (aged 92); San Diego, California, U.S.
- Education: Calvin College; University of Illinois; University of Rochester
- Spouse: Dorothy Koeze (m. 1946; died 1999)
- Children: 2, including Robert
- Scientific career
- Workplaces: University of Chicago Argonne National Laboratory

John Robert Huizenga (April 21, 1921 – January 25, 2014) was an American physicist who helped build the first atomic bomb and who also debunked University of Utah scientists' claim of achieving cold fusion.

== Early life and education ==
John Robert Huizenga was born on a farm near Fulton, Illinois, the son of Henry and Josie (Brands) Huizenga. He attended Erie High School and Morrison High School, graduating from the latter in 1940. He continued his education at Calvin College in Michigan, from which he received a bachelor's degree in 1944. He would maintain his ties to Calvin later in life, for example collaborating on fundamental nuclear research with his Calvin friend Roger Griffioen, who had gone on to become a professor there. Calvin would name him one of the college's Distinguished Alumni in 1975.

Along with other Calvin students, he was recruited after graduation to work for the Manhattan Project, at the Project's site in Oak Ridge, Tennessee, that was dedicated to the production of highly enriched uranium. Following his time in Oak Ridge, he continued his education at the University of Illinois, receiving a Doctor of Philosophy degree in physical chemistry in 1949. On completing his studies he held joint appointments at the University of Chicago and Argonne National Laboratory.

== Professional career ==
During World War II, Huizenga supervised teams at the Manhattan Project in Oak Ridge, Tenn., involved in enriching uranium used in the atomic weapon dropped on Hiroshima in August 1945. During his Argonne years, as a result of examining debris from the "Ivy Mike" nuclear test in 1952, Huizenga was part of the team that added two new synthetic chemical elements, einsteinium and fermium, to the periodic table. Huizenga and his colleagues were at first unable to publish papers on their discoveries in the open literature, because of classification concerns relating to the nuclear test, but these concerns were eventually resolved, and the team was able to publish in Physical Review and thus claim priority for their discovery. During his Argonne years he was one of the founders of the Gordon Research Conferences on nuclear chemistry, serving as chairman of the nuclear chemistry Gordon Conference in 1958. He received a Guggenheim Fellowship in 1964 and took a sabbatical from Argonne to further his studies as a visiting professor at the University of Paris for the 1964–1965 academic year.

In 1967, he became a professor of chemistry and physics at the University of Rochester where he worked for the remainder of his career, apart from a second Guggenheim Fellowship that allowed him to engage in research during the 1973–1974 school year at the University of California, Berkeley, the Technical University of Munich, and the Niels Bohr Institute in Copenhagen. His research interests at Rochester covered topics in nuclear structure of actinides, nuclear fission, and nuclear reactions between heavy ions. He was chairman of the Department of Chemistry from 1983 to 1988, retiring as Tracy H. Harris Professor (later Professor Emeritus) of Chemistry.

During Huizenga's time at Rochester, the university had its own particle accelerator, a tandem Van de Graaff accelerator that produced beams of nuclei accelerated to energies of several MeV per nucleon. This facility, which opened in 1966, afforded him the opportunity to continue his research program in experimental nuclear science. However, the limited beam energies available led him to more powerful accelerators, such as the SuperHILAC at Berkeley and the Los Alamos Meson Physics Facility, LAMPF, at Los Alamos National Laboratory, for his experimental work. His LAMPF proposal to study actinide muonic atoms was one of the earliest experiments to receive beam time at the LAMPF stopped-muon facility.

In 1989, Huizenga co-chaired, with Norman Ramsey, a panel convened by the United States Department of Energy which attempted to debunk claims by two University of Utah chemists that they had achieved nuclear fusion at room temperature. The findings of the Huizenga/Ramsey panel, although highly skeptical of the reality of cold fusion, were cautious:

Based on the examination of published reports, reprints, numerous communications to the Panel and several site visits, the Panel concludes that the experimental results of excess heat from calorimetric cells reported to date do not present convincing evidence that useful sources of energy will result from the phenomena attributed to cold fusion. ... The Panel concludes that the experiments reported to date do not present convincing evidence to associate the reported anomalous heat with a nuclear process. ...

Current understanding of the very extensive literature of experimental and theoretical results for hydrogen in solids gives no support for the occurrence of cold fusion in solids. Specifically, no theoretical or experimental evidence suggests the existence of D-D distances shorter than that in the molecule D2 or the achievement of "confinement" pressure above relatively modest levels. The known behavior of deuterium in solids does not give any support for the supposition that the fusion probability is enhanced by the presence of the palladium, titanium, or other elements.

Nuclear fusion at room temperature, of the type discussed in this report, would be contrary to all understanding gained of nuclear reactions in the last half century; it would require the invention of an entirely new nuclear process.

However, Huizenga later published a book titled "Cold Fusion: The Scientific Fiasco of the Century".

== Awards and honors ==
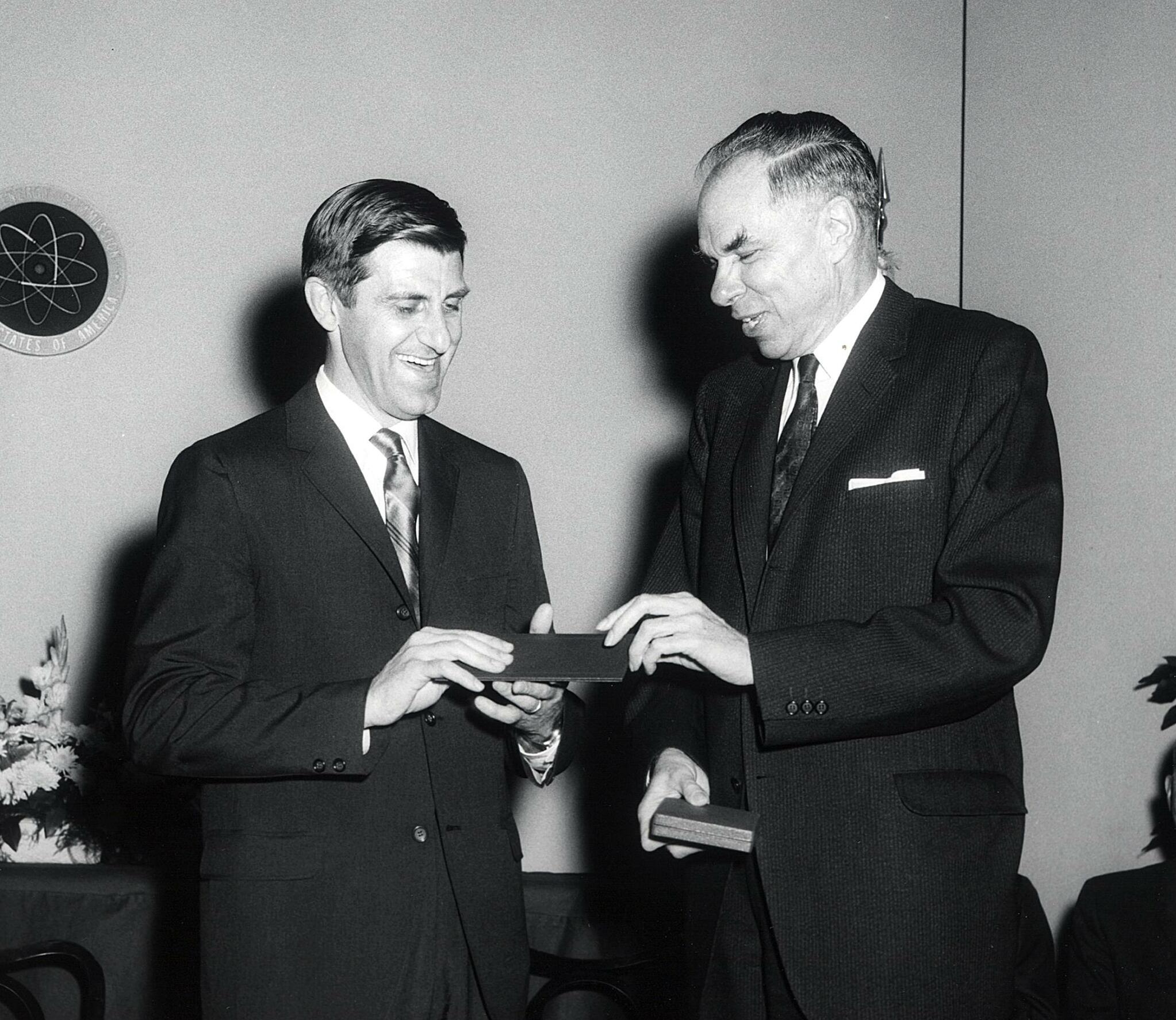
Huizenga (left) being awarded the Ernest Orlando Lawrence Award by Glenn T. Seaborg in 1966

Huizenga was elected to the National Academy of Sciences in 1976 and the American Academy of Arts and Sciences (Fellow) in 1992. He was a 1966 recipient of the Ernest Orlando Lawrence Award bestowed by the United States Atomic Energy Commission.

== Personal life ==
Huizenga married Dorothy Koeze in 1946. They had two sons and two daughters. One son, Dr. Robert Huizenga, is a prominent physician whose career has included a stint as team physician for the Los Angeles Raiders American football team.

Following his retirement from Rochester, Huizenga and his wife moved to North Carolina, where he continued to serve on advisory committees at major accelerator laboratories, worked to debunk cold fusion, and wrote his memoirs. Dolly Huizenga died in 1999. John Huizenga died of heart failure in San Diego, California, in January 2014, aged 92.

== Published works ==
- Huizenga, J.R. (2009). Five Decades of Research in Nuclear Science. Meliora Press, Rochester, New York.
- Huizenga, J.R. (1993). Cold Fusion: The Scientific Fiasco of the Century. Oxford University Press.
- Huizenga, J.R.; Schröder, W.U. (1984). D.Allan Bromley (ed.). Damped Nuclear Reactions, Treatise on Heavy-Ion Science. Plenum Press. pp. 113–726.
- Huizenga, J.R.; Vandenbosch, R. (1973). Nuclear Fission. Academic Press, New York.
