= Mary Bouxsein =

Biomechanical engineer and researcher

- Education: Stanford University
- Scientific career
- Thesis: Physical activity and bone density (1992)

Mary Larsen Bouxsein is an American biomechanical engineer and an orthopedic researcher. She is the president of the American Society for Bone and Mineral Research, director of the Centre of Advanced Orthopaedic Studies at Beth Israel Deaconess Medical Center, professor at the department of Orthopedic Surgery at Harvard Medical School. She is known for her work on bone density and the use of imaging to define the factors leading to bone fractures.

== Education and career ==
Bouxsein graduated from Princeton_High_School_(Illinois) in 1982. She completed her Bachelor of Science in general engineering and Bachelor of Arts in economics from the University of Illinois, Urbana-Champaign in 1987. She completed her Master of Science and Ph.D. in mechanical engineering from Stanford University.

She joined Beth Israel Deaconess Medical Center and Harvard Medical School for a postdoctoral fellowship (1992–95). In 2001, she was appointed as assistant professor in the department of orthopedic surgery at Harvard Medical School. In 2006 she held joint positions as an adjunct assistant professor at Boston University, and in 2008 she also joined as a faculty member in the Massachusetts Institute of Technology Bioastronautics Program. As of 2023 she is a professor of orthopedic surgery at Beth Israel Deaconess Medical Center and Harvard Medical School.

== Research ==
Bouxsein is known for her work on bone biomechanics with the goal of understanding skeletal fragility. Her early work defined methods to quantify bone density, and used ultrasound to predict the risk of bone fractures. She has used animal models to examine bone structure and examined osteoporosis in people. She has also conducted research on spaceflight induced bone loss, and stress fractures in military trainees.

== Selected publications ==
- Bouxsein, Mary L; Boyd, Stephen K; Christiansen, Blaine A; Guldberg, Robert E; Jepsen, Karl J; Müller, Ralph (2010-06-07). "Guidelines for assessment of bone microstructure in rodents using micro-computed tomography". Journal of Bone and Mineral Research. 25 (7): 1468–1486. doi:10.1002/jbmr.141. PMID 20533309.
- Boutroy, Stephanie; Bouxsein, Mary L.; Munoz, Francoise; Delmas, Pierre D. (2005). "In Vivo Assessment of Trabecular Bone Microarchitecture by High-Resolution Peripheral Quantitative Computed Tomography". The Journal of Clinical Endocrinology & Metabolism. 90 (12): 6508–6515. doi:10.1210/jc.2005-1258. ISSN 0021-972X. PMID 16189253.
- Rosen, Clifford J; Bouxsein, Mary L (2006). "Mechanisms of Disease: is osteoporosis the obesity of bone?". Nature Clinical Practice Rheumatology. 2 (1): 35–43. doi:10.1038/ncprheum0070. ISSN 1745-8382. PMID 16932650. S2CID 9953651.

== Honors and awards ==
In 2015 Bouxsein was inducted into the American Institute for Medical and Biological Engineering.
