= Erie High School (Illinois) =

Location
- 435 6th Avenue; Erie, Illinois 61250; United States
- Coordinates: 41°39′08″N 90°04′35″W

Information
- Type: Comprehensive Public High School
- School district: Erie Community Unit School District 1
- NCES District ID: 1714350
- NCES School ID: 171435001773
- Principal: Tim McConnell
- Teaching staff: 21.88 (on an FTE basis)
- Grades: 9–12
- Enrollment: 192 (2023–2024)
- Student to teacher ratio: 8.78
- Campus type: Rural: distant
- Colors: Red, White, Black
- Athletics conference: Three Rivers
- Mascot: The Panthers
- Feeder schools: Erie Middle School
- Website: www.ecusd.info/page/high-school-home

Erie High School, or EHS, is a public four-year high school located at 435 6th Avenue in Erie, Illinois, a village of Whiteside County, Illinois, in the Midwestern United States. EHS is part of Erie Community Unit School District 1, which serves the communities of Erie and Fenton, and includes Erie Middle School, Erie Elementary School, and Erie Preschool. The campus is 25 miles southwest of Sterling, Illinois and serves a mixed village and rural residential community. The school lies within the Sterling micropolitan statistical area.

== Academics ==
In 2009, Erie High School did not make Adequate Yearly Progress, with 49% of students meeting standards, on the Prairie State Achievement Examination, a state test that is part of the No Child Left Behind Act. The school's average high school graduation rate between 1999-2009 was 94%.

Erie High School provides courses in the academic departments of:

- Business
- Computer Education
- Driver Education
- English
- Fine Arts
- Home Economics
- Industrial Technology
- Math
- Miscellaneous
- Physical Education and Health
- Science
- Social Studies
- Spanish

== Athletics ==
Erie High School competes in the Three Rivers Conference and is a member school in the Illinois High School Association. Its mascot is the Cardinals. The school has no state championships on record in team athletics or activities. Erie High School co-ops with Prophetstown High School for the majority of its athletics.
