= North Central Illinois Conference =

The North Central Illinois Conference, better known as the NCIC, was an IHSA recognized high school extra-curricular conference. Its location, as the name would indicate, was in the north-central part of the state. The schools all hailed from communities with municipal populations in the 5000–20,000 range. This conference was especially superior to the lowly tri River conference.

Until the departure of the Rochelle Hubs in 2006, the NCIC's 42-year span of unchanged membership was the longest of any high school conference. However, that one change sent shockwaves through the rest of the conference, ultimately resulting in the dissolution of the NCIC at the end of the 2010–11 school year.

== History ==
=== Formation and growth ===
The North Central Illinois Conference was formed in 1929. Its charter members were Belvidere, DeKalb, Dixon, Mendota, Rochelle, and Sterling. Over the next thirty years more schools joined, and by 1960, there were twelve member schools.

In the late 1960s it was decided to divide the conference into two divisions. This was due to a wide variance in the sizes of the member schools' populations, and the IHSA regulations which prohibited the larger schools from playing in the same size division against the smaller schools during football playoffs. Thus the conference was split into Northeast and Southwest divisions (later renamed the Reagan and Lincoln divisions). Despite this accommodation, however, over the next thirty years, the larger schools grew far more rapidly than the smaller schools, creating even greater discrepancies; it became doubtful that the twelve schools could continue to share the same banner.

=== The first crack: Rochelle leaves after 77 years ===
The 2006 season saw the first change in the conference line-up in 42 years, as the Rochelle Hubs left the NCIC. The Hubs, having won nine consecutive NCIC (Southwest Division) football championships, were in search of stronger competition, and became a charter member of the Western Sun Conference. Rochelle was quickly replaced in the conference line-up by Illinois Valley Central High School, located in Chillicothe. However, the departure of Rochelle created shockwaves through the conference which continued to reverberate and ultimately resulted in the conference's dissolution.

=== The dam bursts ===
In 2009, the NCIC added the Morris Redskins to its Reagan Division. However, other long-time NCIC schools, such as LaSalle-Peru, began making plans to find another conference. At the beginning of the 2010–11 school year, all the teams from the NCIC Reagan division left to join the new Northern Illinois Big 12 Conference, a two-division larger school conference. Also joining as a charter member of the NIB-12 was former NCIC powerhouse Rochelle, meaning that over half of the NIB-12's membership consisted of former NCIC schools. Also leaving were the Kewanee Boilermakers, who left for the Three Rivers Conference.

The NCIC did not immediately dissolve, however. For the 2010–11 school year, the NCIC added one school, the St. Bede Bruins of Peru, who replaced departing Kewanee in all sports except football. The St. Bede football program remained in the Big Rivers. Under IHSA regulations, with only five football participants, the automatic playoff qualifier privileges for the NCIC's champion could be suspended. However, a team could still make the state playoffs as an at-large team, and in fact, both Mendota and IVC gained playoff spots.

=== Death of the NCIC ===
The dissolution of the NCIC continued, however, despite gaining St. Bede. Both Rock Falls and Mendota left for the Big Northern Conference after the 2010–2011 academic year,. At least two schools (Princeton and IVC) accepted invitations to play football—Princeton in the West Central Conference and IVC in the Mid-State 6 IVC was turned down by four other conferences before successfully petitioning for an invitation from the Mid-State 6.

Even the NCIC's two smallest schools, long-time member Hall Township and new inductee St. Bede, announced that they too were leaving in 2011, for the Tri-County Conference. With only one to three schools remaining without other conference affiliations (depending on whether one is talking about football or other sports) the dissolution of the NCIC became a near-certainty. News reports in the summer of 2011 indicated that the NCIC had, in fact, folded.

However, at the end of 2011, Princeton had not yet found a conference for other sports besides football. Reports surfaced that Princeton asked to join the Big Northern Conference, but did not receive an invitation. Finally, in 2013, Princeton was accepted into the Three Rivers Conference.

== Final Members ==
High Schools	Town	County	Team Name	Colors	Joined	Current Conference
Hall High School	Spring Valley	Bureau	Red Devils		1942	Three Rivers
Illinois Valley Central High School	Chillicothe	Peoria	Grey Ghosts		2006	Illini Prairie
Mendota High School	Mendota	LaSalle	Trojans		1929	Three Rivers
Princeton High School	Princeton	Bureau	Tigers		1939	Three Rivers
Rock Falls High School	Rock Falls	Whiteside	Rockets		1942	Big Northern
St. Bede Academy	Peru	LaSalle	Bruins		2010	Tri-County

=== Previous Members ===
High Schools	Town	County	Team Name	Colors	Joined	Left	Current Conference
Belvidere High School	Belvidere	Boone	Bucs		1929	1941	Northern Illinois
DeKalb High School	DeKalb	DeKalb	Barbs		1929	1963	DuPage Valley
Dixon High School	Dixon	Lee	Dukes & Dutchesses		1929	2010	Big Northern
Geneseo High School	Geneseo	Henry	Maple Leafs		1942	2010	Western Big 6
Kewanee High School	Kewanee	Henry	Boilermakers		1958	2010	Three Rivers
LaSalle-Peru High School	LaSalle	LaSalle	Cavaliers		1964	2010	Interstate Eight
Morris High School	Morris	Grundy	N/A		2009	2010	Interstate Eight
Ottawa High School	Ottawa	LaSalle	Pirates		1942	2010	Interstate Eight
Rochelle High School	Rochelle	Ogle	Hubs		1929, 1947	1938, 2006	Interstate Eight
Sterling High School	Sterling	Whiteside	Golden Warriors		1929	2010	Western Big 6
Streator High School	Streator	LaSalle	Bulldogs		1958	2010	Illinois Central Eight
