= Morrison High School (Illinois) =

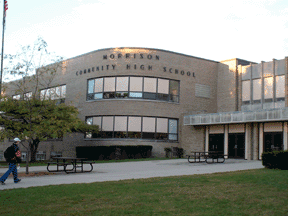
- Morrison High School Building

Location
- 643 Genesee Avenue; Morrison, Whiteside County, Illinois 61270; USA
- Coordinates: 41.79944°N 89.96995°W

Information
- Type: Comprehensive public high school
- School district: Morrison Community Unit School District 6
- Principal: Dusti Markham
- Teaching staff: 19.93 (FTE)
- Grades: 9–12
- Enrollment: 290 (2023–2024)
- Student to teacher ratio: 14.55
- Campus type: Small city
- Colors: Red, white
- Athletics conference: Three Rivers
- Team name: Mustangs/Fillies
- PSAE average: 57%
- Feeder schools: Morrison Junior High School
- Website: Morrison High School

Morrison High School (MHS) is a public four-year high school located at 643 Genesee Avenue in Morrison, Illinois, a small city of Whiteside County, Illinois, in the Midwestern United States. MHS is part of Morrison Community Unit School District 6, which serves the community of Morrison, and includes Morrison Junior High School, and Northside Elementary School, and Southside Elementary School. The campus is 13 miles west of Sterling, Illinois. The school serves a mixed small city, village, and rural residential community. The school lies within the Sterling micropolitan statistical area.

== Academics ==
School mascot

In 2009, Morrison High School did not make Adequate Yearly Progress, with 57% of students meeting standards, on the Prairie State Achievement Examination, a state test that is part of the No Child Left Behind Act. The school's average high school graduation rate between 1999 and 2009 was 93%.

The school offers courses in the following academic departments:

- Math
- English
- Social Studies
- Science
- Business
- Consumer Science
- Art
- Music
- Agriculture
- Physical Education
- Foreign Language
- Miscellaneous

== Athletics ==
Morrison High School competes in the Three Rivers Conference and is a member school in the Illinois High School Association. Its teams are known as the Mustangs (boys) and Fillies (girls).

The school has won four state championships in team athletics or activities: boys' track and field in 2006 (3rd place), boys' football in 2009-2010 and 2011–2012, and girls' softball in 2010–2011. Morrison's dance team, the MHS Pons, have 22 state titles in the IDTA category.

== Notable alumni ==
- John R. Huizenga, professor of chemistry and physics, participated in the Manhattan Project, elected to the National Academy of Sciences
