= Fulton High School (Illinois) =

Location
- 1207 12th Street; Fulton, Illinois 61252; United States; 41°51′54″N 90°09′10″W

Information
- Type: Comprehensive Public High School
- School district: River Bend Community Unit School District
- Principal: Jeff Parsons
- Teaching staff: 23.26 (FTE)
- Grades: 9–12
- Enrollment: 284 (2024–2025)
- Student to teacher ratio: 12.21
- Campus type: Small city
- Colors: Scarlet, Black
- Athletics conference: Northwest Upstate Illini Conference
- Mascot: The Steamers
- PSAE average: 57%
- Feeder schools: River Bend Middle School
- Website: riverbendschools.org/fhs/

Fulton High School, or FHS, is a public four-year high school located in Fulton, Illinois, a small city in Whiteside County, Illinois. FHS is part of the River Bend Community Unit School District, which serves the communities of Fulton and Albany, and includes River Bend Middle School, and Fulton Elementary School. The campus is less than 2 miles from Clinton, Iowa, which lies just across the Mississippi River, and 25 miles northwest of Sterling, Illinois. The school serves a mixed small city, village, and rural residential community. The school lies within the Sterling micropolitan statistical area.

== Academics ==
In 2009, Fulton High School did not make Adequate Yearly Progress, with 57% of students meeting standards, on the Prairie State Achievement Examination, a state test that is part of the No Child Left Behind Act. The school's average high school graduation rate between 1999-2009 was 89%.

== Athletics ==
Fulton High School competes in the Northwest Upstate Illini Conference and is a member school of the Illinois High School Association. Its mascot is the Steamers. The school has 2 state championships on record in team athletics or activities, both in Boys Football in 1976-77 and 1991-92.

== History ==
Albany High School, to the south of Fulton, shut its doors in 1944 and students went to neighboring Fulton and Cordova (now deactivated and incorporated into Riverdale) High Schools with the Albany school district paying the tuition.
