= Logan Lee =

American football player (born 2000)

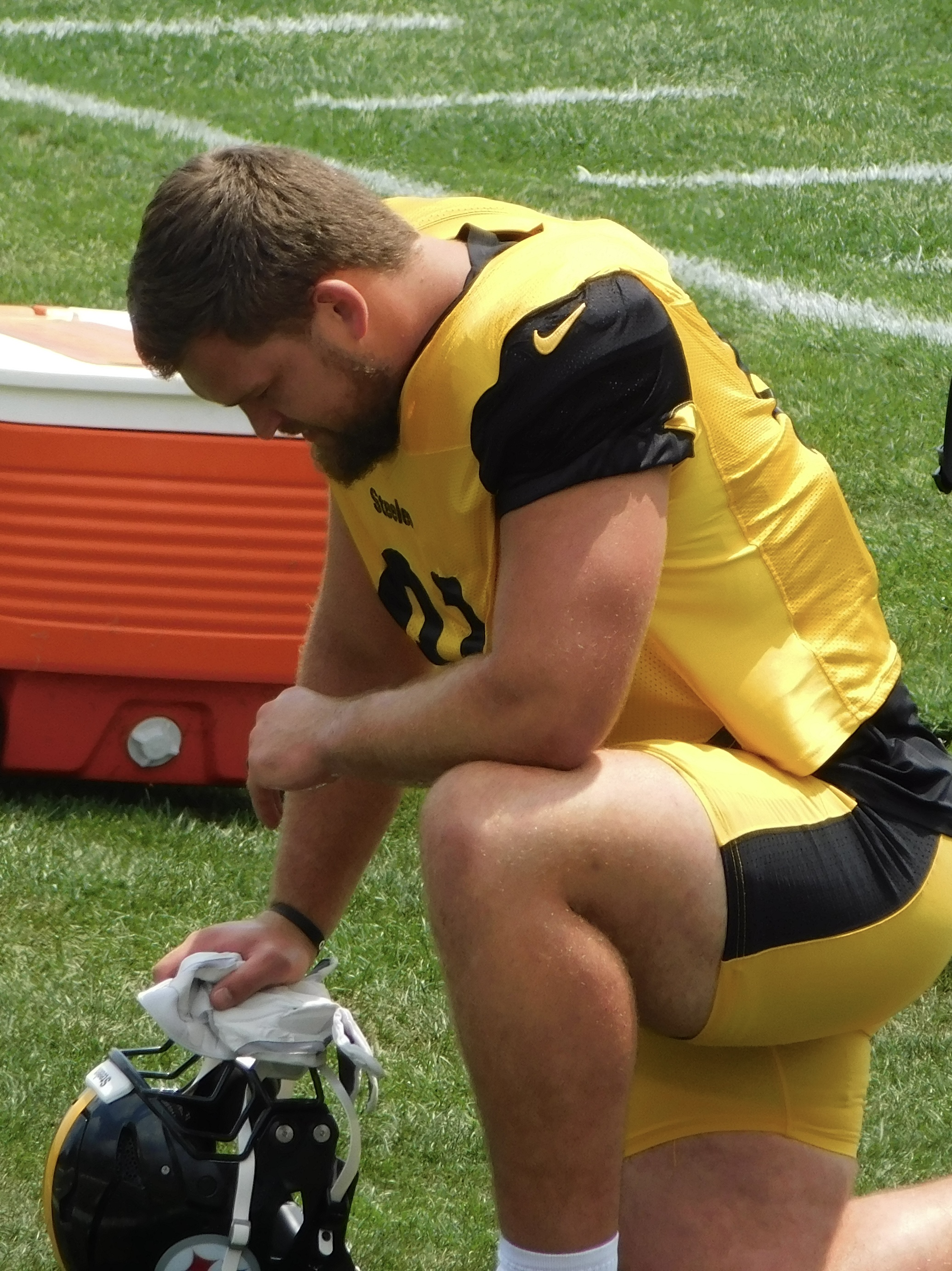
- Lee with the Pittsburgh Steelers in 2025

No. 91 – Pittsburgh Steelers
- Position: Nose tackle
- Roster status: Injured reserve

Personal information
- Born: June 12, 2000 (age 26); Orion, Illinois, U.S.
- Listed height: 6 ft 5 in (1.96 m)
- Listed weight: 286 lb (130 kg)

Career information
- High school: Orion
- College: Iowa (2019–2023)
- NFL draft: 2024: 6th round, 178th overall pick

Career history
- Pittsburgh Steelers (2024–present)

Career NFL statistics as of 2025
- Total tackles: 2
- Pass deflections: 2
- Stats at Pro Football Reference

Logan Lee (born June 12, 2000) is an American professional football nose tackle for the Pittsburgh Steelers of the National Football League (NFL). He played college football for the Iowa Hawkeyes.

== Early life ==
Lee attended high school at Orion High School in Orion, Illinois. In Lee's final two seasons of high school, he totaled 54 receptions for 934 yards and 18 touchdowns, while also notching 120 tackles with 42.5 being for a loss, and 27 sacks. Coming out of high school, Lee held offers from schools such as Michigan, Wisconsin, Illinois, Iowa, Missouri, Michigan State, Minnesota, Ole Miss, and Northwestern. Lee decided to commit to play college football for the Iowa Hawkeyes.

== College career ==
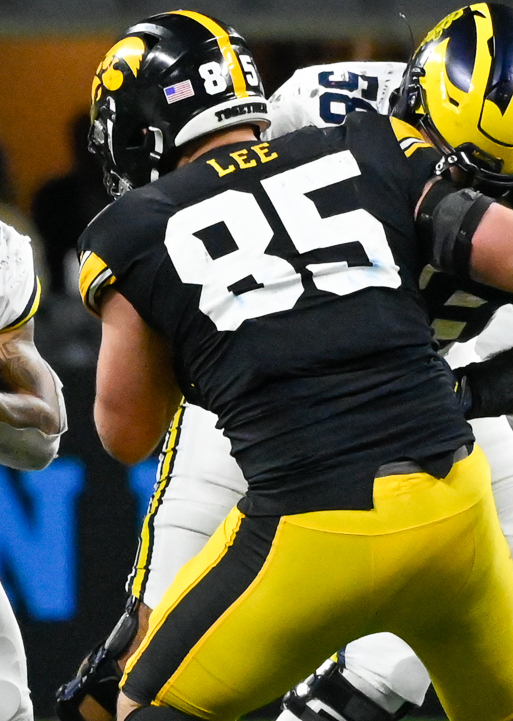
Lee in 2023

In Lee's first collegiate season in 2019, he redshirted and not appear in any games. In the 2020 season, Lee played in just two games where he made one tackle.

During the 2021 season, Lee started in all 14 games where he tallied 48 tackles with five being for a loss, three sacks, and a fumble recovery. Lee finished the 2022 season with 54 tackles, with eight being for a loss, three sacks, and two fumble recoveries. For his performance on the 2022 season, Lee was honored as an all-Big Ten honorable mention selection. In week two of the 2023 season, Lee blocked a field goal in a 20–13 win over rivals Iowa State. During the 2023 season, Lee recorded 55 tackles with five and a half going for a loss, three sacks, and three pass deflections. For his performance on the 2023 season, Lee was named a Big Ten honorable mention selection.

In Lee's career with the Hawkeyes, he played in 43 games where he notched 158 tackles with 18.5 being for a loss, nine sacks, and seven pass deflections.

== Professional career ==
Pre-draft measurables
Height	Weight	Arm length	Hand span	Wingspan	40-yard dash	10-yard split	20-yard split	20-yard shuttle	Three-cone drill	Vertical jump	Broad jump	Bench press
6 ft 5 3/8 in (1.97 m)	281 lb (127 kg)	32 1/4 in (0.82 m)	10 1/4 in (0.26 m)	6 ft 6 7/8 in (2.00 m)	5.05 s	1.77 s	2.91 s	4.37 s	7.16 s	31.5 in (0.80 m)	9 ft 6 in (2.90 m)	25 reps
All values from NFL Combine

Lee was selected in the sixth round with the 178th overall pick by the Pittsburgh Steelers in the 2024 NFL draft. Lee suffered a calf injury in preseason, and was placed on injured reserve on September 7, 2024. He returned to practice on December 31.

Lee made the Steelers 53-man roster to begin the 2025 season. He played in seven games, recording two tackles and two passes defensed.

On August 13, 2026, Lee was placed on season–ending injured reserve.

== Personal life ==
Lee married his wife, Tori Verbeck, in July 2022. Their son was born in December 2024.
