= WorkKeys =

Workplace skill assessment tests

ACT WorkKeys consists of three elements:

- Job skill assessments, which are designed to measure foundational and personal skills as they apply to the workplace
- Job analysis, which pinpoints or estimates skill benchmarks for specific job positions that individuals must meet through testing
- Skill training, which helps individuals boost their scores

== Skill assessments ==
ACT WorkKeys includes eight workplace skill assessments:

Three core assessments used to earn the National Career Readiness Certificate (NCRC):

- WorkKeys Applied Math (formerly Applied Mathematics) – applying mathematical reasoning to work-related problems
- WorkKeys Workplace Documents (formerly Reading for Information) – comprehending work-related reading materials such as memos, bulletins, policy manuals, and governmental regulations
- WorkKeys Graphic Literacy (formerly Locating Information) – using information from sources such as diagrams, floor plans, tables, forms, graphs, and charts

Additional assessments available:

- Applied Technology – understanding technical principles as they apply to the workplace
- Business Writing – composing clear, well-developed messages relating to on-the-job situations
- Fit – how interests and values correspond to a particular career
- Talent – includes dependability, assertiveness, and emotional stability
- Workplace Observation – paying attention to details in instructions and demonstrations

== Job analysis ==
The job analysis component of ACT WorkKeys, known as Job Profiling, helps to set benchmarks that correspond with WorkKeys scores, giving the examinee a target score to hit in order to qualify for a job.

Employers use job profiling to determine which skills are required for a job, and the level of each skill needed to perform the job successfully. This helps employers determine the standards for how an applicant must score in a particular WorkKeys skill assessment in order to be qualified for the job.

In the job profiling process, ACT-licensed profilers visit with the client company or organization and determine background information on the job to be profiled and how specifically the job relates to the company. The profiler tours the company and collects materials – such as training manuals, annual reports, company newsletters – that define the company.

The profiler then compiles an initial list of the tasks most relevant to the job being profiled. Subject matter experts – those who know the job best through incumbency or supervising the job – refine the list and rate each task based on two factors: importance of the task to the job and relative time spent on it. The subject matter experts then decide what minimum level of each skill is required to perform the job successfully.

The examinee's score on an ACT WorkKeys test corresponds to their preparedness or the level of remedial training needed.

ACT WorkKeys also offers two job analysis products that can be used without the help of a job profiler. ACT SkillMap, an online service which links job tasks to the skill levels of WorkKeys assessments, is used primarily to identify employees’ training needs. WorkKeys Estimator is a paper-and-pencil system that gives quick estimates of the WorkKeys skill levels needed for a job.

== Skill training ==
The ACT WorkKeys system also includes computer-based and classroom-based training for individuals that corresponds with ACT WorkKeys exams. There are curricula available for every skill level of each ACT WorkKeys foundational skill exam.

== Alternative versions ==
Some ACT WorkKeys exams are available in Spanish and Braille versions in addition to the standard English.

== ACT National Career Readiness System ==
ACT WorkKeys exams are the foundation of the ACT National Career Readiness System, a job skills credentialing system. People can earn an ACT National Career Readiness Certificate by taking three ACT WorkKeys exams: Applied Math, Graphic Literacy and Workplace Documents. They are awarded certificates of Platinum, Gold, Silver, and Bronze levels, depending on their test scores. ACT estimates that people scoring at the Bronze level have the foundational skills for approximately 17% of the jobs profiled by ACT using WorkKeys. A Silver score indicates skills for approximately 69% of those jobs profiled, a Gold for 93% of the jobs, and a Platinum 99% of the jobs.

== Statewide and community adoptions ==
Several states, communities, and cities have adopted ACT WorkKeys as part of their economic development or educational initiatives.

Illinois and Michigan have made ACT WorkKeys exams part of their state high school graduation requirements. Starting in 2001, two ACT WorkKeys tests, Applied Mathematics and Reading for Information, became part of the Prairie State Achievement Examination for all 11th graders in Illinois, along with the ACT Test. In 2007, the Michigan Department of Education made the ACT WorkKeys Reading for Information and Applied Mathematics exams a part of its Michigan Merit Exam, a mandatory exam for 11th graders that also includes the ACT Test.

As of 2006, 14 states were participating in the ACT National Career Readiness System and using ACT WorkKeys as part of that participation. Many states use ACT WorkKeys scores in their economic development initiatives, to demonstrate to business relocation prospects that their residents possess high job skills. These state initiatives include skill credentialing programs that are affiliated with the ACT National Career Readiness Certificate. According to ACT, 38 states were participating in the program as of 2011. The state of Kentucky issued a Kentucky Employability Certificate to adult education participants based on their performance on three ACT WorkKeys assessments: Reading for Information, Applied Mathematics, and Locating Information. In 2010, Kentucky switched to the National Career Readiness Certificate (NCRC) as part of its statewide realignment of education, economic development and workforce development known as WorkSmart Kentucky North Carolina issues a North Carolina Career Readiness Certificate on the basis of scores on the same three ACT WorkKeys components.

The South Carolina Department of Education requires some career education teachers to validate their competency in basic skills by obtaining specified minimum scores on the ACT WorkKeys assessments of Reading for Information, Applied Mathematics, and Writing.

== Use by employers ==
ACT WorkKeys is used by many business organizations. Companies that have required some or all job applicants to submit WorkKeys scores include:

- CME Automotive
- Dow Corning
- Eastman Chemical
- Hemlock Semiconductor
- Northrop Grumman Ship Systems
- WestRock Company Paper and Packaging Solutions.

== See also ==
- High school graduation examination in the United States
- School-to-work transition
