= Sod Ryan =

American football player (1905–1964)

No. 12, 83
- Position: Tackle

Personal information
- Born: December 31, 1905; Kewanee, Illinois, U.S.
- Died: December 9, 1964 (aged 58); Wenatchee, Washington, U.S.
- Listed height: 6 ft 2 in (1.88 m)
- Listed weight: 205 lb (93 kg)

Career information
- High school: Kewanee
- College: Detroit

Career history
- Chicago Bears (1929); Portsmouth Spartans (1930); Chicago Bears (1931)*
- * Offseason or practice squad member only
- Stats at Pro Football Reference

John Joseph "Sod" Ryan (December 31, 1905 – December 9, 1964) was an American professional football tackle who played two seasons in the National Football League (NFL) with the Chicago Bears and Portsmouth Spartans. He played college football at the University of Detroit.

== Early life and college ==
John Joseph Ryan was born on December 31, 1905, in Kewanee, Illinois. He first played high school football at Kewanee High School. He was the football team captain during his junior year in 1922. Ryan spent his senior year at St. Edward's High School in Austin, Texas.

Ryan played college football for the Detroit Titans of the University of Detroit and was a two-year letterman from 1927 to 1928.

== Professional career ==
Ryan signed with the Chicago Bears of the National Football League (NFL) on September 12, 1929. He played in five games, starting one, for the Bears during the 1929 season.

Ryan appeared in three games, starting one, for the Portsmouth Spartans of the NFL in 1930.

Ryan signed with the Bears again in 1931 but was later released.

== Personal life ==
Ryan was the owner and president of the Columbia Valley Finance Co. He died on December 9, 1964, in Wenatchee, Washington of a heart attack.
