= Michigan Merit Exam =

Minimum-competency test for students in Michigan, United States

- Acronym: MME
- Type: SAT, ACT WorkKeys, M-STEP
- Administrator: Michigan Department of Education
- Purpose: To measure academic proficiency and meet federal/state accountability standards
- Year started: 2007
- Regions: Michigan, United States

The Michigan Merit Exam (MME) is a replacement for the Michigan Educational Assessment Program (MEAP) test, a minimum-competency test for high school students. It was optional for class of 2007 (i.e., it could be taken instead of the MEAP) but was required for the class of 2008 and beyond. The MME is used to measure "Adequate yearly progress" as required under the No Child Left Behind Act.

Part of the MME is the SAT (originally, the MME included the ACT from 2007 to 2015). In addition, there are Michigan-specific sections, including one on social studies and science, known as the M-STEP, and the WorkKeys test.

Juniors are generally not expected to attend afternoon classes after completion of Michigan Merit Exam, though some exceptions do exist.

== Sections ==
Students’ MEAP scores are divided into four performance levels: Exceeded Expectations, Met Expectations, Basic, and Apprentice. Students who place in either the Met Expectations or Exceeded Expectations levels are considered to be “proficient” in that subject. Those who place in the Apprentice or Basic levels are deemed to be “not proficient.” The student must score a 1100 to earn the label "Met Expectations."

=== English ===
The English portion of the exam is broken into three sub-scores: reading, writing, and "English Language Arts". This portion tests very basic elementary school English in a multiple choice format. No knowledge of literature is required.

A sample question would be: Read this passage carefully: parts inside a computer include:

- CPU
- Hard drive
- RAM
- Graphics card

What would you not find inside a computer:

- A:CPU
- B:Hard drive
- C:RAM
- D:Graphics card
- E:Television

The answer is E:Television

=== Science ===
Which one is an organic compound
A: NaCl
B: NO
C: NH_{3}
D: CH_{4}

The answer is D: CH_{4}

=== WorkKeys ===
The WorkKeys test is a section of the MME which tested students' ability to handle everyday business work: reading forms, handling addresses, scheduling, and similar.

It was added as a requirement for members of the class of 2007 who took the MEAP.

== Scholarship eligibility ==
Students who took and passed the MME were eligible for the Michigan Promise Scholarship, which provides up to $4,000 for post secondary education in Michigan or a military service academy. However, the allocated funding for this program was withheld due to the state budget cuts in PA 132 of 2009 for the 2009-2010 fiscal year, thus rendering said scholarship non-existent for students graduating later than 2007.
