= Robert Huizenga =

American physician

Robert Huizenga, also known as "Dr. H" on The Biggest Loser, is a former team physician for the Los Angeles Raiders. He has been a contributor on reality television shows, is the author of three books including one that was the basis for Oliver Stone's film Any Given Sunday, and has performed research in sports medicine, metabolism (including reversal of AODM2), COVID-19 treatment and age-reversal.

Huizenga grew up in Rochester, New York, and was valedictorian and all-county football, wrestling and track at Penfield High. At the University of Michigan, he was honors math and biology and an NCAA All-American wrestler setting the NCAA record for takedown percent (he was not taken down). While at Harvard Medical School, he was an immunology major and an all-star rugby player. He did his medical residency at Cedars-Sinai Medical Center, focusing on internal medicine and sports medicine, and was appointed Chief Medical Resident, following which he entered a pulmonary fellowship before leaving to work as a team physician for the Los Angeles Raiders as well as to be the national medical correspondent for Breakaway (FOX) and several years later for The Home Show (ABC).

== Career ==
After working for eight years as the Los Angeles Raiders' team physician and for 4 years as president and president-elect for the NFL Physician's Society, he wrote You’re OK, It’s Just a Bruise—A Doctor’s Sideline Secrets about Pro-Football’s Most Outrageous Team, which provoked a national debate on anabolic steroids and other ergogenic (sport enhancing) aids over a decade before the senate "steroid" hearings. While the sections about steroids gained the most attention because they also dealt with the illness and death of Lyle Alzado, the book's main focus was about the demand to have injured players return to the field ASAP even if they were at risk for worse injuries. Huizenga also wrote of his conflicts with Al Davis over the downright dangerous and malpractice level failings of a late team doctor who was a Davis confidante.

This book was the basis for Oliver Stone’s Any Given Sunday; Matthew Modine played Huizenga in the movie. Huizenga sued Warner Brothers-AOL over screenwriter and source material credit after the movie was released and won an undisclosed settlement. He continues to be active in the world of professional sports, being called in 2009 as an expert witness by the House Judiciary Committee looking into catastrophic brain injuries in football players.

Huizenga was a defense witness in the 1995 O.J. Simpson murder trial. Simpson defense lawyer Robert Shapiro chose to take Simpson to Huizenga for medical examination three days after the murders of Nicole Brown Simpson and Ronald Goldman, and delivered testimony of his findings at trial

He has had recurring roles as writer, correspondent and advisor on numerous TV shows and movies, including, The Biggest Loser, (for 17 continuous seasons) Extreme Makeover, American Gladiators, Student Body, Dance Your Ass Off, Fourth and Long, Into the Wild, and Gone Girl. Past consulting jobs include Trapper John, M.D., Nurses, Empty Nest and House of God.

Huizenga next authored Where Did All the Fat Go? The Wow! Prescription to Reach Your Ideal Weight and Stay There, about his straightforward obesity treatment based on knowledge gained while working with professional athletes and on NBC's The Biggest Loser.

In January 2013, he opened "The Clinic", a combination resort, spa, and medical facility focusing on body optimization as well as the treatment of obesity and obesity-related illness. In 2016, Huizenga filed a lawsuit against The New York Post for libel after a series of articles with slanderous claims. The "unnamed source" quoted in the Post's article was in fact never interviewed. Despite the fact that individuals in the public eye face a far higher bar to win a libel lawsuit (they must not only demonstrate the newspaper printed a falsehood, they must in addition prove the newspaper at the time of printing knew the information was false) - Huizenga prevailed and the New York Post settled the libel suit for an undisclosed sum.

Huizenga then released Sex, Lies and STDs: The Must Read Before You Swipe Right. Curiously, this book was in part inspired by an outrageously ignorant article in the New York Post showing blatant bias against the millions of persons worldwide with HIV. The initial chapters chronicle Huizenga's Los Angeles intern days when he helped one of the first individuals diagnosed with HIV. It later bookends those early days by up-close chronicling the November 2015 events surrounding Charlie Sheen's bombshell announcement of his HIV status on The Today Show with Matt Lauer.

In 2018, Huizenga began following inflammation markers and DNA methylation to see if a cocktail of natural food based NAD+ precursors and enhancers known to mimic the beneficial effects of exercise might also slow or even reverse aging in humans (multiple academic centers have already documented similar compounds ability to reverse aging in animals). Serendipitously, Huizenga found these very substances appeared to reverse COVID-19 double pneumonia and cytokine storm in elderly, critically ill individuals.

== Personal life ==
Huizenga's father, John R. Huizenga, was a nuclear physicist who worked as a member of the Manhattan Project and later a member of the teams that discovered the elements einsteinium and fermium.

Robert Huizenga married Wanda in August 1979; the couple had three children, two daughters and a son, before she filed for separation in May 2012.
