= Jack Heflin =

American football player (born 1998)

No. 96 – New York Jets
- Position: Defensive end
- Roster status: Active

Personal information
- Born: March 8, 1998 (age 28); Galesburg, Illinois, U.S.
- Listed height: 6 ft 3 in (1.91 m)
- Listed weight: 304 lb (138 kg)

Career information
- High school: Prophetstown (Prophetstown, Illinois)
- College: Northern Illinois (2016–2019); Iowa (2020)
- NFL draft: 2021: undrafted

Career history
- Green Bay Packers (2021–2022); New York Giants (2022); Houston Roughnecks (2023); New Orleans Saints (2023); Los Angeles Rams (2024–2025); New York Jets (2026–present)

Awards and highlights
- All-XFL Team (2023)

Career NFL statistics as of 2025
- Total tackles: 3
- Stats at Pro Football Reference

Jackson Dean Heflin (born March 8, 1998) is an American professional football defensive end for the New York Jets of the National Football League (NFL). He played college football for the Northern Illinois Huskies and Iowa Hawkeyes.

== College career ==
Heflin played college football at Northern Illinois for four seasons, earning second-team all-Mid-American Conference honors for the Huskies in 2019. In 2020, he transferred to Iowa and started 2020 at defensive tackle next to Daviyon Nixon.

== Professional career ==
Pre-draft measurables
Height	Weight	Arm length	Hand span	Wingspan	40-yard dash	10-yard split	20-yard split	20-yard shuttle	Three-cone drill	Vertical jump	Broad jump	Bench press
6 ft 3 in (1.91 m)	304 lb (138 kg)	32 1/2 in (0.83 m)	9 3/8 in (0.24 m)	6 ft 7 7/8 in (2.03 m)	5.33 s	1.80 s	3.03 s	4.62 s	7.57 s	29.0 in (0.74 m)	8 ft 8 in (2.64 m)	25 reps
All values from Pro Day

=== Green Bay Packers ===
In 2021, Heflin signed with the Green Bay Packers as an undrafted free agent, and made the team's Opening Day roster. He was released on January 21, 2022. The Packers re-signed Heflin to a futures contract on January 27, following their playoff exit. He was waived on August 30, and was re-signed to the practice squad the following day. On December 13, Heflin was released from the practice squad.

=== New York Giants ===
On December 15, 2022, Heflin was signed to the New York Giants' practice squad. He was released from the practice squad on January 3, 2023. The Giants re-signed Heflin to their practice squad on January 6, then released him four days later.

=== Houston Roughnecks ===
On January 8, 2023, Heflin signed with the Houston Roughnecks of the XFL. On May 8, Heflin was named to the All-XFL team. He was released from his contract on May 15.

=== New Orleans Saints ===
On May 15, 2023, Heflin signed with the New Orleans Saints. He was waived on August 29, and was subsequently re-signed to the team's practice squad.

Following the end of the regular season, the Saints signed Haener to a reserve/future contract on January 8, 2024. On August 27, Heflin was waived by the Saints.

=== Los Angeles Rams ===
On December 3, 2024, Heflin was signed to the Los Angeles Rams' practice squad.

Heflin signed a reserve/future contract with Los Angeles on January 20, 2025. On August 26, Heflin was waived by the Rams as part of final roster cuts and re-signed to the practice squad the next day.

=== New York Jets ===
On February 2, 2026, Heflin signed a reserve/future contract with the New York Jets. Heflin was waived by the Jets as a part of final roster cuts on August 30; he was re-signed to the team's practice squad the following day. He was promoted to the active roster on September 22.

== NFL career statistics ==
=== Regular season ===
Year	Team	Games		Tackles					Interceptions						Fumbles				
Year	Team	GP	GS	Cmb	Solo	Ast	Sck	TFL	Int	Yds	Avg	Lng	TD	PD	FF	Fum	FR	Yds	TD
2021	GB	4	0	1	0	1	0.0	0	0	0	0.0	0	0	0	0	0	0	0	0
2022	NYG	1	0	0	0	0	0.0	0	0	0	0.0	0	0	0	0	0	0	0	0
2023	NO	1	0	1	0	1	0.0	0	0	0	0.0	0	0	0	0	0	0	0	0
2025	LAR	1	0	1	1	0	0.0	0	0	0	0.0	0	0	0	0	0	0	0	0
Total		7	0	3	1	2	0.0	0	0	0	0.0	0	0	0	0	0	0	0	0
