= Michigan Student Test of Educational Progress =

Standardized test in Michigan

The Michigan Student Test of Educational Progress (M-STEP) is a state-mandated assessment for public elementary and middle school students in Michigan. After replacing the Michigan Educational Assessment Program (MEAP) in the 2014–15 school year, it has been administered during the spring of each school year to the vast majority of public school students, with a few exceptions for special populations.

== About ==
The M-STEP was announced on November 13, 2014, a replacement for the 44-year-old Michigan Educational Assessment Program, and the first statewide assessment to be completely online. About 1,900 schools in Michigan tested the pilot test system. The Michigan Legislature ordered for all students in grades 3 to 8 to take the M-STEP starting spring of 2015. The M-STEP also involves the Michigan Merit Exam for 11th graders. The M-STEP assesses student performance in English Language Arts, Mathematics, Science (for grades 5, 8, and 11), and Social Studies (grades 5, 8, 11).

The primary purpose of the M-STEP is to evaluate students' proficiency in key subject areas as outlined by the state's academic standards. These standards represent the expectations students should meet by the end of each grade level. In 2015, the first year of the test, 47.8% of students passed the English section, 21.4% passed science, 31.7% passed social studies, and 36.9% passed math. In 2016, the second year of the test, 47.3% of students passed English section, 21.4% passed science, 30.3% passed social studies, and 37.2% passed math.

Michigan public school students are required to take the M-STEP annually, typically during the spring semester. This assessment is a legal requirement mandated by federal and state laws to ensure accountability and educational quality. In 2020, the requirement was waived. In 2021, with Covid precautions still in place, schools were required to offer the exam but were not required to meet the 95% quota.

The M-STEP uses various item types for scoring, including multiple choice, constructed response, and technology-enhanced items. Scores are reported in terms of scale scores, assessment claims, and performance levels. M-STEP reports provide detailed individual-level data and aggregated data to parents, educators, and policymakers. These reports include individual student reports, parent reports, student roster reports, and aggregate data reports. The Michigan State School Reform Office uses the data in its decisions to close chronically low-performing schools.
