= Michigan Educational Assessment Program =

Standardised school test

The Michigan Educational Assessment Program (MEAP) was a standardized test. The test was taken by all public school students in the U.S. state of Michigan from elementary school to middle/junior high school from the 1969–70 school year to the 2013–14 school year. For high school students the MEAP test was replaced in the 2006–07 school year by the Michigan Merit Exam.^{3}, ^{5}.

The test was replaced in the 2014–15 school year by the Michigan Student Test of Educational Progress, or M-STEP.

The tests have high content validity with respect to the subject specific curriculum for the particular grade level in the State of Michigan. The participation at MEAP testing sessions is mandatory for all public school students. (Journal of Vocational Behavior 60, 178–198 (2002)

== History ==
The program was started by the State Board of Education and supported by then Governor William G. Millken. The MEAP tests were first administered during the 1969–70 school year for the purpose of determining at various points in a student's career, their progress compared to standards set by the State Board of Education. As of Spring 2015 the MEAP has been replaced with the M-STEP (Michigan Student Test of Educational Progress).
