= Princeton High School (Illinois) =

Location
- 103 S Euclid Ave; Princeton, Illinois 61356; United States; 41.3744°N 89.4595°W

Information
- Type: Public
- Established: 1867
- Locale: District #500
- Superintendent: Andy Berlinski
- Principal: Abbi Bosnich
- Teaching staff: 29.75 (FTE)
- Grades: 9-12
- Enrollment: 486 (2023–2024)
- Student to teacher ratio: 16.34
- Color
- Athletics: Click to see
- Mascot: Tiger
- Campus: Rural

Princeton High School (officially Princeton Township High School) is a high school located at 103 S. Euclid Ave in Princeton, Illinois. It generally has an attendance close to 600 students.

It is operated by the Princeton High School District 500, which includes Princeton, Dover, and Malden. The district is mostly in Bureau County, with small portions extending into Putnam County.

== History ==
Princeton High School was founded in 1867 and graduated its first class in 1869. The school was started as a boarding school and taught subjects as English, mathematics, history, and the sciences. The school was enlarged in both 1894 and 1908 in order to accommodate for increases in attendance. The school was completely destroyed by fire on December 15, 1924. Plans were then drawn up to build a new school, but in the meantime, classes were held in City Hall, the Post Office, and the Christian and Mission Covenant Churches in Princeton. The new school opened its doors on September 27, 1926. The building, 350 feet (110 m) long and 100 feet (30 m) wide, contained twenty classrooms; an auditorium seating 1,100; a library; a science lecture room; chemistry, physics and botanical laboratories; and a gymnasium. The building is still in use today, though several additions and renovations have taken place since then.

The first addition was built in 1958 and contained a new English classroom, an art room, industrial arts classroom and shop, agriculture classroom and shop, cafeteria-study hall, and a new gymnasium. The main building was also remodeled which provided for the expansion of the speech-English accommodations, expansion of the business education space, and a new library. In 1970 another new addition was constructed at the south end of the campus to make room for the growing student population. The new addition is commonly known as the English Building, and, as its name suggests, it houses English classrooms. The building was originally intended to be temporarily used for a few years but is still in use today. In the spring of 1985 another addition began. Cherrie Science Addition was started which connected the 1926 building and the 1958 addition. The new facility was completed in 1986. It houses science, special education, and drama rooms. It also made the entire school handicap accessible.

Two major projects were undertaken during the 1990s. Due to changes in IHSA rules, Princeton needed a new all-weather track to replace the old cinder track. The auditorium had also fallen into disrepair and needed to be renovated. An all weather track was completed on Bryant Field and was dedicated as the Frank and Marion Rathje Track in 1997 for their generous contributions to the effort. Mr. Rathje was a banker in the Chicago area like his father, Frank C. Rathje. The Princeton High School Foundation raised over 1 million dollars to renovate the auditorium. The new Sally Skinner Council Auditorium was dedicated in November 1999. Both projects were majorly funded by members of the community. In 2003 several classrooms were renovated. In the fall of 2004, Princeton High School began what turned into a somewhat controversial new addition to the school.

The school received a large grant from the Illinois State Board of Education to add on more classrooms and a new library. The controversy occurred mostly because of the timing of the addition. The addition was being built at a time when the school was struggling financially and was forced to make cuts in both faculty and classes. Enrollment was also declining so an addition did not seem practical. Many students and faculty members were frustrated that the funds were being put toward the addition instead of keeping teachers and classes. However, there was nothing the school board could do about it, because the State Board had allotted the funds solely for the purpose of building expansion.

== Academics ==
Princeton operates under what is known as the Block scheduling system, specifically the four-block system. The school operates using A/B days, alternating classes every other day. There are four, 75 minute classes per day with 5 minute passing periods between each class. The school year is divided into 2 semesters that each last approximately eighteen weeks. Princeton uses an unweighted 4.0 point grading scale.

65% of 11th graders at Princeton met or exceeded standards on the reading portion of the Prairie State Achievement Exam in 2006, 7% higher than the statewide average of 58%. 54% met or exceeded standards in the Math portion which was equivalent to the statewide average. 58% met or exceeded standards in science.

In the 2004–2005 school year, the average class size was 18 students. The attendance rate was 93.6%, the graduation rate was 99.3% and the dropout rate was 1%.

In the 2006–2007 school year, the average class size was 27 students. Classes must have a minimum of 15 students enrolled before it is allowed to be placed on the daily class schedule.

Independent study coursework is available by arrangement through the guidance office for students wanting to make up missing credits or to work ahead. College level independent study classes are also available in the same manner. There are costs to parents who want their children to take coursework in this manner.

Princeton offers German and Spanish as foreign languages.

== Athletics and extracurricular activities ==
The school colors of Princeton High School are officially blue and gray, though over the last several years various uniforms have generally been blue and white.

From 1939 to 2011, Princeton's athletic teams competed as members of the North Central Illinois Conference. However, with the dissolution of the NCIC after the 2010–2011 school year, the Tigers were left without a conference affiliation, as Princeton was the only school from the NCIC to fail to secure an invitation from another conference. As of the 2014 school year, Princeton High School is in the Three Rivers Conference.

Princeton's main rival for many years has been former NCIC conference-mate Hall High School from nearby Spring Valley. The rivalry is probably the most intense when the two schools meet in football. A more recent rivalry has developed with nearby Bureau Valley High School, which was just formed in 1995. Many heated battles have taken place between the two teams in basketball. They have met for several intense Regional and Sectional final games, however their rivalry does not extend to football because the two teams are in different conferences and different IHSA classes. Another rivalry is between Princeton and Kewanee High School. Despite the fact that the teams compete annually for a traveling trophy in football, this rivalry is much less intense than those with Hall and Bureau Valley.

One of Princeton's school songs, "Princeton Loyalty," was written by Princeton native and renowned organist Virgil Fox. Princeton's fight song, "Let's Win This Game" is also used by Concord University.

Princeton High School offers the following interscholastic sports at the varsity level:

- Boys Baseball
- Boys and Girls Basketball
- Cheerleading
- Boys and Girls Cross Country
- Boys Football
- Boys and Girls Golf
- Pom-pom
- Boys and Girls Soccer
- Girls Softball
- Boys and Girls Tennis
- Boys and Girls Track and Field
- Girls Volleyball
- Boys Wrestling

Princeton has enjoyed some success on the state level of athletics competitions. The Girls Volleyball team won the state title in 1990. This is the only state championship Princeton has won. However Princeton has trophied in other sports at the state level as well:

- 1979 Boys Cross Country 2nd Place
- 1980 Boys Cross Country 2nd Place
- 1981 Boys Track and Field 3rd Place
- 1989 Boys Football 2nd Place
- 2003 Boys Golf 3rd Place
- 2008 Girls Volleyball 4th Place

Extracurricular activities include:

The Music and Theatre Departments have a full program that involve over 225 students each year on average. Concert Choir, Junior Varsity Choir, Freshman Choir, Concert Band and Technical Theater are offered as regular classes.

The Fine Arts Department puts on the following activities each year: Fall Choir Concert & Art Show, Fall Play, Madrigal Dinner Performance, Holiday concerts for all three choirs and for the Concert and Jazz bands and Art Show, Spring Choir Concert & Art Show, Spring Musical, and an Annual Ice Cream Social, where all musical ensembles perform in a laid back style.

The Vocal and Instrumental Music Departments also have student participants for the IMEA and IHSA solo and ensemble as well as group concert performances each year. Princeton High Schools Concert Choir performed at the 2014 Illinois Music Educators Conference, as one of three high school choirs performing.

Other group extra curricular clubs and organizations include: Student Council, First Class, National Honor Society, Scholastic Bowl (Varsity and Junior Varsity), Yearbook Club, German Club, Lifesavers, Science club, and Engineering Club

== Demographics ==
According to the state board of education, in 2006 Princeton High School's student body was 97.2% Caucasian, 0.7% Hispanic, 0.9% African American, and 1.2% Asian. 21.5% of students were considered low-income and 0% were considered to be limited in English proficiency.

== Notable alumni ==
- Keith Knudsen, former drummer with The Doobie Brothers
- Colin Mickow, distance runner
- Ben Parr, venture capitalist, author and former co-editor of Mashable
- Robert Petkoff, American stage actor
- Joe Ruklick, basketball player with the Philadelphia Warriors
- Richard Widmark, Actor
- Nick Young, retired correspondent and anchor of the CBS World News Roundup
