= Kewanee High School =

Location
- 1211 E. Third St. Kewanee, Illinois 61443; USA

Information
- Type: Public secondary
- Motto: "Home of the Boilermakers"
- Status: Open
- School district: Kewanee Community Unit District #229
- Principal: Amanda Tidwell
- Faculty: 99
- Teaching staff: 34.70 (on an FTE basis)
- Grades: 9–12
- Enrollment: 610 (2023–2024)
- Student to teacher ratio: 17.58
- Campus: Small city
- Color
- Mascot: Boilermaker
- Website: Kewanee High School

Kewanee High School, or KHS, is a public four-year high school located at 1211 E. Third Street in Kewanee, Illinois, a city in Kewanee Township of Henry County, Illinois, in the Midwestern United States. KHS is part of Kewanee Community Unit School District 229, which also includes Central Junior High School, Central Elementary School, Irving Elementary School, Belle Elementary School, and Lyle Preschool. The campus is 40 miles (64 km) northeast of Galesburg, Illinois, 44 miles (71 km) southeast of Moline, Illinois, and serves a mixed city and rural residential community. The school is one of two high schools in the city of Kewanee, the other being Wethersfield High School. The school is within the Davenport-Moline-Rock Island, IA-IL metropolitan statistical area.

== Academics ==
In 2009, 52% of students tested met or exceeded standards on the Prairie State Achievement Examination, a state test that is part of the No Child Left Behind Act. The percent of KHS students considered low income is 60%. The school's average high school graduation rate between 1999-2009 was 80%.

In 2009, the faculty was 99 teachers, averaging 12.7 years of experience, and of whom 46% held an advanced degree. The average class size was 17.1 The student to faculty ratio was 19.2. The district's instructional expenditure per student was $4,289. School enrollment decreased from 607 to 539 (11%) in the period of 1999-2009

The Kewanee High School Drama department has also had many successes. The Group Interpretation team has travelled to state in 2006, 2007, 2008, 2009, 2010, 2011, 2012, and 2013. They have also sent many students to compete in the state individual events (speech). The following students have competed at the state level in speech: 2008: Betty Maes, Special Occasion Speaking 2009: (results unavailable) 2010: Blake Bullock and Caitlin Arrington: Dramatic Duet Acting/ Brooks Bullock and Austin Peed, Humorous Duet Acting/ Ryan Branom, Impromptu Speaking 2011: Blake Bullock, Dramatic Interpretation/ Blake Bullock and Caitlin Arrington, Dramatic Duet Acting 2012: Blake Bullock, Dramatic Interpretation (3rd place) and Prose Reading (7th place) 2013: John Williams III, Original Comedy / Zach Murphy, Humorous Interpretation / Em Grebner and Ellen Johnson, Dramatic Duet Acting

In 2010, KHS Alumni Elizabeth VanDamme (nee Maes) became the novice state champion in Poetry Interpretation at the IIFA State speech and Debate tournament hosted at Illinois Central College.

== Athletics ==
Kewanee is a member school in the Illinois High School Association; its mascot is the Boilermaker. The school has 6 state championships on record in team athletics and activities: boys' cross country (1996), boys' golf (1948), and debate (1948) Music (2024, 2025, and 2026).

For nearly 50 years, Kewanee High School competed in the North Central Illinois Conference (NCIC). However, after the 2009-2010 school year, KHS left the NCIC and joined the Three Rivers Conference.

== Notable alumni ==
- Walter T. Bailey, first licensed American-African architect in the state of Illinois
- Neville Brand, actor
- Abbey Curran, American beauty queen who represented Iowa at Miss USA 2008 and was the first contestant with cerebral palsy to compete. She also made an appearance on The Ellen DeGeneres Show and CBS 'The Early Show'.
- Em Lindbeck, Former MLB player (Detroit Tigers)
- Sod Ryan, American football player
