= Newman Central Catholic High School =

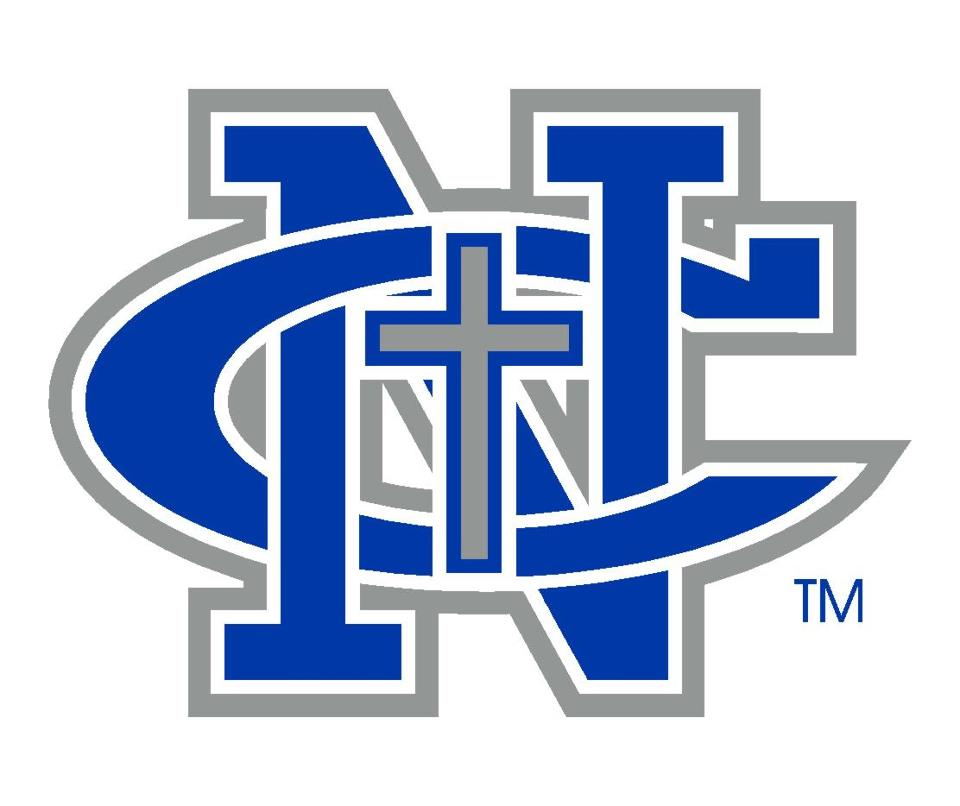

Location
- 1101 St. Marys Road; Sterling, Illinois 61081; United States; 41°48′28″N 89°42′43″W

Information
- Type: Private, Coeducational
- Motto: In Jesus' name we pray, teach, learn, and serve
- Denomination: Roman Catholic
- Patron saint: Saint John Henry Newman
- Established: 1915
- Founder: Monsignor A.J. Burns
- Superintendent: Jennifer Oetting
- Principal: Jennifer Oetting
- Chaplain: Fr. Thomas Doyle
- Grades: 9–12
- Enrollment: 181 (2023-2024)
- Colors: Blue, White and Gray
- Song: N.H.S. N.H.S. We salute the blue and white N.H.S. N.H.S. for our colors we will fight Ever loyal,‘til we die For our victory we will fight Come on team let’s win For good old Newman High. Fight team fight, fight team fight As we march on down the field Fight team fight, fight team fight Charge the foe and make them yield Gallantly, we never fail For a victory we will cry Come on team, let’s win For good old Newman High,
- Athletics conference: Three Rivers Athletic Conference
- Sports: Football, volleyball, boys' and girls' basketball, boys' and girls' tennis, track and field, cross country, baseball, bass fishing, golf, table tennis, scholastic bowl, boys' and girls' wrestling
- Mascot: Corwin the Comet
- Team name: Comets
- Rival: Princeton Tigers
- Accreditation: North Central Association of Colleges and Schools
- Tuition: ~$10,100 a year
- Feeder schools: St. Anne's (Dixon) St. Mary's (Sterling) St. Mary's (Dixon) St. Andrew's (Rock Falls)
- Website: www.newmancchs.org

Newman Central Catholic High School is a diocesan Catholic high school in Sterling, Illinois. It is located in the Roman Catholic Diocese of Rockford.

It was founded as St. Mary High School in 1915, a parochial school attached to St. Mary's Parish. It later moved across the street and became Community Catholic High School. It adopted its present name when it moved into its current facilities in 1960. It was staffed in its early years by the Sisters of Loreto, but nearly all the staff today is laity.

Drawing primarily from Sterling, Rock Falls, and Dixon, but also from cities such as Oregon and Amboy. According to the statistics taken, Newman's enrollment for 2023-2024 is 181 students.

== Athletics ==
The Newman Comets (and Lady Comets) participate in IHSA athletics and activities. They play under the Three Rivers Athletic Conference in all sports.

Mike Mena is a notable alumni in Wrestling. He was the first 4x undefeated State Champion from 1989-1992. He went on to wrestle at the university of Iowa where he was a 4x All American placing 7th, 3rd, 5th & 2nd at the NCAA’s from 1994-1997 after taking a red shirt year in 1993.

  After his controversial loss in the 1997 NCAA finals to Eric Guerrero of Oklahoma State, in over time, the rules were changed to allow more over time periods rather than one 30 second period that is heavily influenced by coin toss. 

The Newman Comets boys' football team, known as "The Blue Machine," won the IHSA State Championship in 1990, 1994, 2004, 2010, 2013, and 2019 and placed second in 1993 and 1998. Coach "Papo" Papoccia led the team to their first five IHSA State Championships, before his eventual retirement in 2018. Coach Brandon Kreczmer took the role as head coach, leading the Newman team to a victorious state run in 2019. The team is now under the advisory of head coach Michael LeMay.

Another IHSA State Championship belongs to Boys' Cross Country in 2009-2010. A few years later in the 2012-2013 season, Newman Cross Country went on a seven year streak of team appearances at the IHSA State Championship, with the team being led by such names as Bryson Reyes, Drew Rosengren, Chris Ahlers, Spencer Mauch, and Shay Hafner. This streak ended with the 2019-2020 season, only to be revitalized with the 2021-2022 boys team, under a new young core of Lucas Schaab, Lucas Simpson, Kenny Boesen, Carver Grummert, and Espen Hammes.

Other notable State appearances and victories include: Boys' Wrestling (1984-1985, 2010-2011). The Newman Boys' track team won the 2013 Class A State Championship. In 2019 senior Brody Ivy became a state champion in Class 1A IHSA wrestling. In 2018 the Newman boys basketball team placed third at the IHSA Class 1A state championships.
