= Orion, Illinois =

Orion
- Village
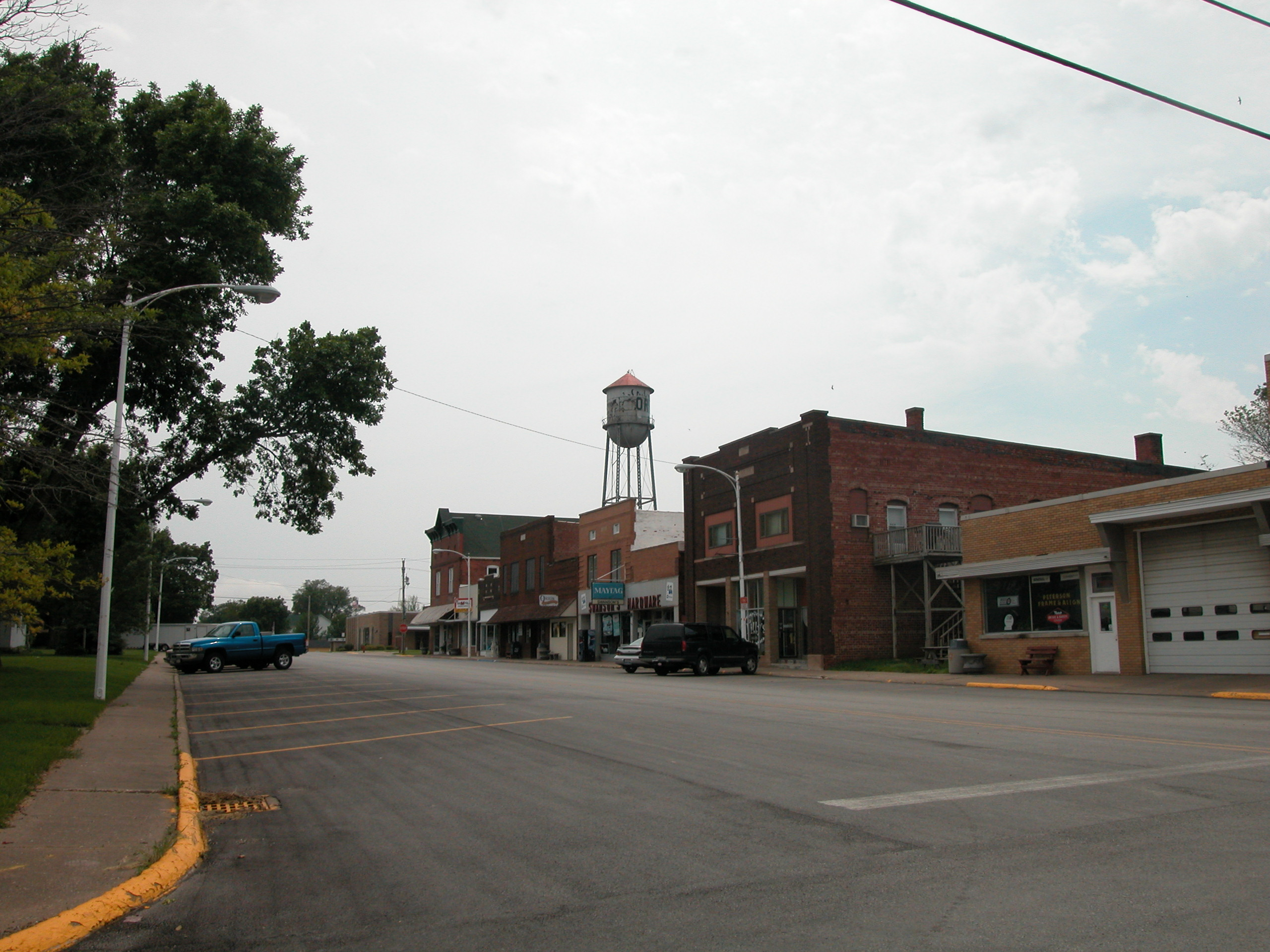
- Downtown Orion in 2004

- Location of Orion within Illinois
- Coordinates: 41°21′05″N 90°22′35″W
- Country: United States
- State: Illinois
- County: Henry

Area
  - Total: 0.95 sq mi (2.45 km^{2})
  - Land: 0.95 sq mi (2.45 km^{2})
  - Water: 0 sq mi (0.00 km^{2})
- Elevation: 768 ft (234 m)

Population (2020)
  - Total: 1,754
  - Density: 1,851/sq mi (714.8/km^{2})
- Time zone: UTC-6 (CST)
  - Summer (DST): UTC-5 (CDT)
- ZIP code: 61273
- Area code: 309
- FIPS code: 17-56601
- GNIS feature ID: 2399584
- Website: orionil.org

Orion (/ˈoʊriːˌən/ OR-ee-on) is a village in Henry County, Illinois, United States. The population was 1,754 at the 2020 census. It is the site for transmitters for many of the Quad Cities' radio and television stations, including KLJB, KWQC-TV, WMWC-TV, WQAD-TV, WQPT-TV and KQIN. FM radio station transmitters include WLKU and WXLP.

== History ==
Orion was laid out on December 26, 1853, by Charles W. Dean. Until 1867 it was called Deanington.

=== Historic places ===
Two Orion locations are listed in the National Park Service's National Register of Historic Places:

- Central Park Music Pavilion – 1208 5th Street
- West Water Tower and Ground Storage Tank – 310 11th Avenue

== Geography ==
According to the 2021 census gazetteer files, Orion has a total area of 0.94 square miles (2.43 km^{2}), all land.

== Demographics ==
Historical population
Census	Pop.	Note	%±
1880	604		—
1890	624		3.3%
1900	584		−6.4%
1910	655		12.2%
1920	613		−6.4%
1930	620		1.1%
1940	715		15.3%
1950	829		15.9%
1960	1,269		53.1%
1970	1,801		41.9%
1980	2,013		11.8%
1990	1,821		−9.5%
2000	1,713		−5.9%
2010	1,861		8.6%
2020	1,754		−5.7%
U.S. Decennial Census

=== 2020 census ===
As of the 2020 census, Orion had a population of 1,754 and 507 families residing in the village. The population density was 1,858.05 inhabitants per square mile (717.40/km^{2}).

The median age was 40.6 years. 24.7% of residents were under the age of 18 and 19.6% of residents were 65 years of age or older. For every 100 females, there were 93.4 males, and for every 100 females age 18 and over there were 93.3 males age 18 and over.

There were 752 households, of which 32.3% had children under the age of 18 living in them. Of all households, 53.9% were married-couple households, 16.4% were households with a male householder and no spouse or partner present, and 25.7% were households with a female householder and no spouse or partner present. About 30.0% of all households were made up of individuals and 15.0% had someone living alone who was 65 years of age or older.

0.0% of residents lived in urban areas, while 100.0% lived in rural areas. There were 781 housing units, of which 3.7% were vacant. The homeowner vacancy rate was 0.8% and the rental vacancy rate was 4.9%.

Racial composition as of the 2020 census
Race	Number	Percent
White	1,661	94.7%
Black or African American	6	0.3%
American Indian and Alaska Native	1	0.1%
Asian	2	0.1%
Native Hawaiian and Other Pacific Islander	0	0.0%
Some other race	15	0.9%
Two or more races	69	3.9%
Hispanic or Latino (of any race)	50	2.9%

=== Income and poverty ===
The median income for a household in the village was $68,625, and the median income for a family was $77,132. Males had a median income of $54,115 versus $33,036 for females. The per capita income for the village was $33,310. About 1.4% of families and 2.9% of the population were below the poverty line, including 0.0% of those under age 18 and 6.3% of those age 65 or over.

== Schools ==
Public schools in Orion are governed by Orion Community Unit School District 223. While the district educates pre-kindergarten through 12th grade, it does not account for private and non-profit preschools that are also available.

=== Elementary school ===
- C.R. Hanna

=== High school ===
- Orion High School
