= Hall High School (Illinois) =

Public high school in the United States

Location
- 800 West Erie Street; Spring Valley, Illinois 61362; United States
- 41.3262°N 89.2129°W

Information
- Type: Comprehensive Public High School
- School district: Hall High School District 502
- Superintendent: Jesse Brant
- Principal: Adam Meyer
- Teaching staff: 35.44 (FTE)
- Grades: 9–12
- Enrollment: 410 (2023–2024)
- Student to teacher ratio: 11.57
- Campus type: Small city
- Colors: Red and white
- Mascot: Red Devils
- Website: Hall High School

Hall High School, also known as Spring Valley Hall, or HHS, is a public four-year high school located at 800 West Erie Street in Spring Valley, Illinois, a small city in Bureau County, Illinois, in the Midwestern United States. HHS serves the communities and surrounding areas of Spring Valley, Bureau, Cherry, Dalzell, Ladd, and Seatonville. The campus is located 20 miles west of Ottawa, Illinois, and serves a mixed small city, village, and rural residential community.

== Academics ==
Potential reference/citation:

== Athletics ==
Hall High School mascot

Hall High School participated in the Three Rivers Conference, North Division, and is a member school in the Illinois High School Association. Their mascot is the Red Devils, with school colors of red and white. The school has 2 state championships on record in team athletics and activities: Boys Football in 1995–1996 (3A) and 2001–2002 (3A).

Formerly a part of the NCIC Conference at the beginning of the 2013–2014 school year, Hall joined the Three Rivers Conference.

== History ==
As of 2015, Hall has been in-session in a newly built, 32 million dollar school.

Hall High School has no known consolidations in the recent past. Surrounding communities may have possessed high schools at some time which were consolidated into the current HHS. Potential reference/citation:
