= Erie, Illinois =

Erie
- Village
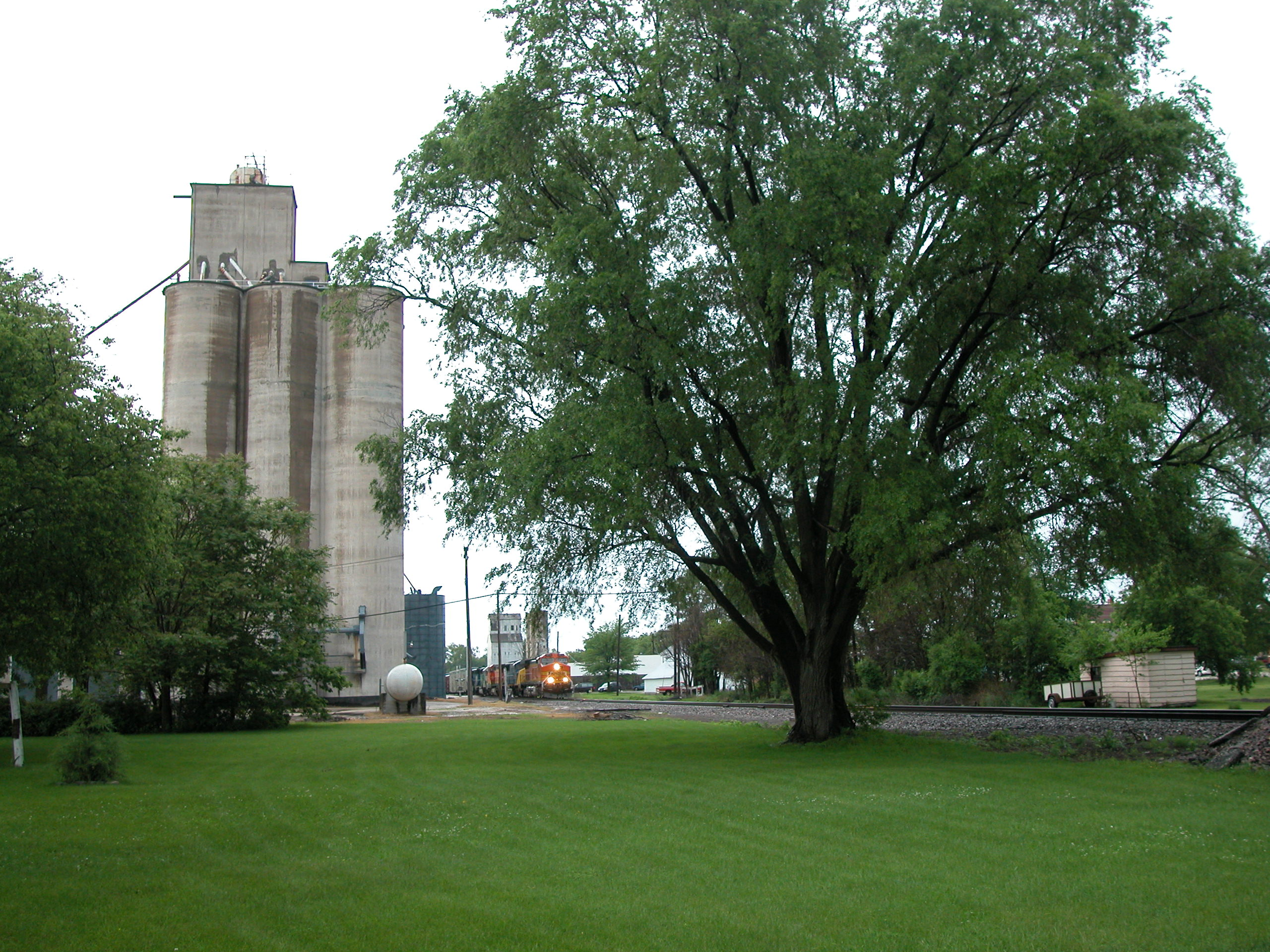
- Grain elevator and the BNSF Railway in Erie.

- Location of Erie in Whiteside County, Illinois.
- Coordinates: 41°39′32″N 90°04′53″W
- Country: United States
- State: Illinois
- County: Whiteside

Area
  - Total: 1.39 sq mi (3.60 km^{2})
  - Land: 1.38 sq mi (3.58 km^{2})
  - Water: 0.012 sq mi (0.03 km^{2})
- Elevation: 587 ft (179 m)

Population (2020)
  - Total: 1,518
  - Density: 1,099.6/sq mi (424.57/km^{2})
- Time zone: UTC-6 (CST)
  - Summer (DST): UTC-5 (CDT)
- ZIP code: 61250
- Area code: 309
- GNIS ID: 2398840
- FIPS code: 17-24374
- Website: www.villageoferie.com

Erie is a village in Whiteside County, Illinois, United States. As of the 2020 census, Erie had a population of 1,518. It is known for its unusual layout, specifically its "town triangle".

== History ==
Erie is named after Erie County, New York.

== Geography ==
According to the 2010 census, Erie has a total area of 1.449 square miles (3.75 km^{2}), of which 1.44 square miles (3.73 km^{2}) (or 99.38%) is land and 0.009 square miles (0.02 km^{2}) (or 0.62%) is water.

== Demographics ==
Historical population
Census	Pop.	Note	%±
1880	537		—
1890	535		−0.4%
1900	768		43.6%
1910	804		4.7%
1920	957		19.0%
1930	888		−7.2%
1940	1,052		18.5%
1950	1,180		12.2%
1960	1,215		3.0%
1970	1,566		28.9%
1980	1,725		10.2%
1990	1,572		−8.9%
2000	1,589		1.1%
2010	1,602		0.8%
2020	1,518		−5.2%
U.S. Decennial Census

=== 2020 census ===
As of the 2020 census, Erie had a population of 1,518. The median age was 40.5 years. 24.4% of residents were under the age of 18 and 18.9% of residents were 65 years of age or older. For every 100 females there were 99.7 males, and for every 100 females age 18 and over there were 96.1 males age 18 and over.

0.0% of residents lived in urban areas, while 100.0% lived in rural areas.

There were 636 households in Erie, of which 30.0% had children under the age of 18 living in them. Of all households, 49.8% were married-couple households, 16.7% were households with a male householder and no spouse or partner present, and 24.7% were households with a female householder and no spouse or partner present. About 27.7% of all households were made up of individuals and 14.3% had someone living alone who was 65 years of age or older.

There were 682 housing units, of which 6.7% were vacant. The homeowner vacancy rate was 0.8% and the rental vacancy rate was 15.3%.

Racial composition as of the 2020 census
Race	Number	Percent
White	1,447	95.3%
Black or African American	4	0.3%
American Indian and Alaska Native	5	0.3%
Asian	6	0.4%
Native Hawaiian and Other Pacific Islander	0	0.0%
Some other race	6	0.4%
Two or more races	50	3.3%
Hispanic or Latino (of any race)	33	2.2%

=== 2000 census ===
As of the 2000 United States census, there were 1,589 people, 630 households, and 466 families residing in the village. The population density was 438.2/km^{2} (1.132.7/sq mi). There were 663 housing units at an average density of 472.6 per square mile (182.5/km^{2}). The racial makeup of the village was 98.80% White, 0.25% African American, 0.13% Native American, 0.38% from other races, and 0.44% from two or more races. Hispanic or Latino of any race were 0.88% of the population.

There were 630 households, out of which 33.5% had children under the age of 18 living with them, 61.4% were married couples living together, 8.6% had a female householder with no husband present, and 26.0% were non-families. 23.7% of all households were made up of individuals, and 13.7% had someone living alone who was 65 years of age or older. The average household size was 2.52 and the average family size was 2.98.

In the village, the population was spread out, with 26.0% under the age of 18, 7.6% from 18 to 24, 26.3% from 25 to 44, 22.8% from 45 to 64, and 17.3% who were 65 years of age or older. The median age was 39 years. For every 100 females, there were 87.8 males. For every 100 females age 18 and over, there were 87.6 males.

The median income for a household in the village was $41,806, and the median income for a family was $46,435. Males had a median income of $35,000 versus $21,447 for females. The per capita income for the village was $18,775. About 4.7% of families and 5.1% of the population were below the poverty line, including 8.3% of those under age 18 and 3.8% of those age 65 or over.

== Education ==
Erie Community Unit School District 1 is the public school district.
