= Port Byron, Illinois =

Port Byron
- Village
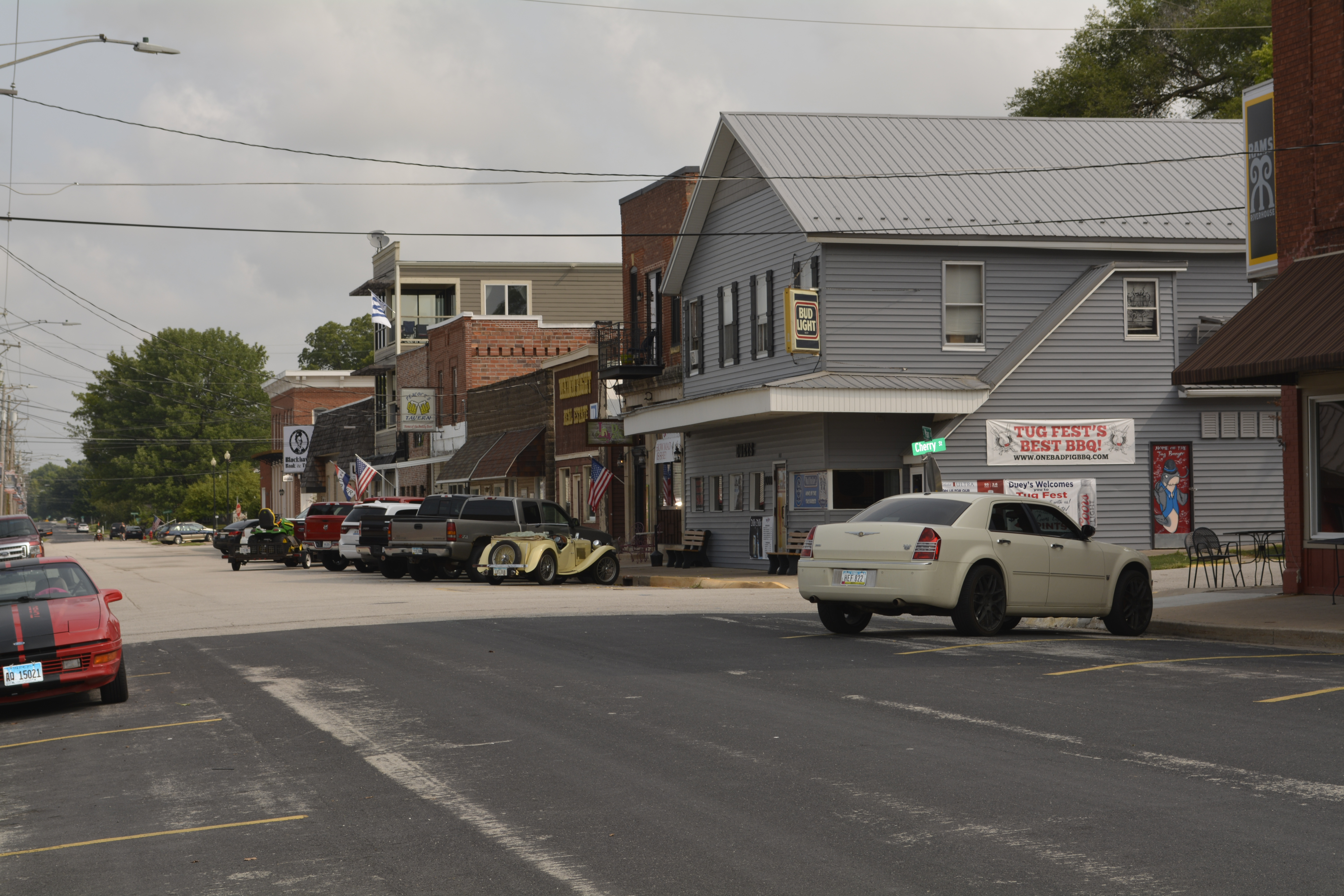
- Downtown Port Byron

- Seal
- Motto: "Honoring the past and Building the future"
- Location of Port Byron in Island County, Illinois.

- Location of Illinois in the United States
- Coordinates: 41°37′20″N 90°19′41″W
- Country: United States
- State: Illinois
- County: Rock Island
- Founded: 1828

Area
  - Total: 2.48 sq mi (6.43 km^{2})
  - Land: 2.43 sq mi (6.29 km^{2})
  - Water: 0.054 sq mi (0.14 km^{2})
- Elevation: 682 ft (208 m)

Population (2020)
  - Total: 1,668
  - Density: 687/sq mi (265.3/km^{2})
- Time zone: UTC−6 (CST)
  - Summer (DST): UTC−5 (CDT)
- ZIP code: 61275
- Area code: 309
- FIPS code: 17-61223
- GNIS feature ID: 2399002
- Website: portbyronil.com

Port Byron is a village in Rock Island County, Illinois, United States and part of the Quad Cities Metropolitan Area. The population was 1,668 at the time of the 2020 census; up from 1,647 at the 2010 census.

== Geography ==
According to the 2010 census, Port Byron has a total area of 2.48 square miles (6.42 km^{2}), all land.

== Demographics ==
Historical population
Census	Pop.	Note	%±
1860	652		—
1870	576		−11.7%
1880	799		38.7%
1890	775		−3.0%
1900	732		−5.5%
1910	642		−12.3%
1920	510		−20.6%
1930	587		15.1%
1940	861		46.7%
1950	1,050		22.0%
1960	1,153		9.8%
1970	1,222		6.0%
1980	1,289		5.5%
1990	1,002		−22.3%
2000	1,535		53.2%
2010	1,647		7.3%
2020	1,668		1.3%
U.S. Decennial Census

=== Racial and ethnic composition ===
Port Byron village, Illinois – Racial and ethnic composition Note: the US Census treats Hispanic/Latino as an ethnic category. This table excludes Latinos from the racial categories and assigns them to a separate category. Hispanics/Latinos may be of any race.
Race / Ethnicity (NH = Non-Hispanic)	Pop 2000	Pop 2010	Pop 2020	% 2000	% 2010	% 2020
White alone (NH)	1,494	1,577	1,506	97.33%	95.75%	90.29%
Black or African American alone (NH)	1	3	10	0.07%	0.18%	0.60%
Native American or Alaska Native alone (NH)	2	0	2	0.13%	0.00%	0.12%
Asian alone (NH)	0	2	7	0.00%	0.12%	0.42%
Native Hawaiian or Pacific Islander alone (NH)	1	0	0	0.07%	0.00%	0.00%
Other race alone (NH)	0	1	10	0.00%	0.06%	0.60%
Mixed race or Multiracial (NH)	59	18	48	3.84%	1.09%	2.88%
Hispanic or Latino (any race)	25	46	85	1.63%	2.79%	5.10%
Total	1,582	1,647	1,668	100.00%	100.00%	100.00%

=== 2020 census ===
As of the 2020 census, Port Byron had a population of 1,668. The median age was 41.9 years. 23.7% of residents were under the age of 18 and 18.8% of residents were 65 years of age or older. For every 100 females there were 101.4 males, and for every 100 females age 18 and over there were 101.9 males age 18 and over.

58.2% of residents lived in urban areas, while 41.8% lived in rural areas.

There were 695 households in Port Byron, of which 29.6% had children under the age of 18 living in them. Of all households, 56.8% were married-couple households, 16.3% were households with a male householder and no spouse or partner present, and 21.4% were households with a female householder and no spouse or partner present. About 26.1% of all households were made up of individuals and 10.0% had someone living alone who was 65 years of age or older.

There were 745 housing units, of which 6.7% were vacant. The homeowner vacancy rate was 1.1% and the rental vacancy rate was 8.4%.

=== 2010 census ===
As of the census of 2010, there were 1,676 people, 623 households, and 419 families residing in the village. The population density was 664.3 inhabitants per square mile (256.5/km^{2}). There were 659 housing units at an average density of 285.2 per square mile (110.1/km^{2}). The racial makeup of the village was 98.83% White, 0.07% African American, 0.20% Native American, 0.07% Pacific Islander, 0.07% from other races, and 0.78% from two or more races. Hispanic or Latino of any race were 1.63% of the population.

There were 623 households, out of which 30.0% had children under the age of 18 living with them, 57.9% were married couples living together, 6.9% had a female householder with no husband present, and 32.6% were non-families. 28.6% of all households were made up of individuals, and 12.4% had someone living alone who was 65 years of age or older. The average household size was 2.46 and the average family size was 3.08.

In the village, the age distribution of the population shows 25.6% under the age of 18, 7.9% from 18 to 24, 27.4% from 25 to 44, 25.5% from 45 to 64, and 13.6% who were 65 years of age or older. The median age was 40 years. For every 100 females, there were 102.8 males. For every 100 females age 18 and over, there were 99.0 males.

The median income for a household in the village was $47,768, and the median income for a family was $59,000. Males had a median income of $44,926 versus $26,208 for females. The per capita income for the village was $24,363. About 2.1% of families and 4.0% of the population were below the poverty line, including 1.0% of those under age 18 and 8.8% of those age 65 or over.

== Tug Fest ==
The event of the year in this small town is the Great River Tug Fest, held since 1987 on the second full weekend in August. Following a fireworks display on Friday night, the Mississippi River is closed on Saturday afternoon. The tug-of-war is made up of 10 men teams of 20 and one woman's team of 25. After a large rope is pulled across the river to Le Claire, Iowa, a tug of war takes place. The side with the most wins gets bragging rights for the year, along with the traveling alabaster trophy. Port Byron, the 2026 champion, holds an overall record of 28–11 in the competition with the last Le Claire victory occurring in 2013. The rope used for the tug is 2700 feet in length and weighs about 700 lbs. Tug Fest is the only event in the United States that allows the Mississippi River to be closed down. The Illinois women are the only undefeated team in Tug Fest history.

== Will B. Rolling ==
Will B. Rolling is the name of a 30' high statue of a rider perched atop his Penny-farthing. Erected on November 13, 2013, along the Great River Trail in Port Byron, the statue was a gift to the village from former mayor Lawrence Bay and his wife Carol. The "Will B. Rolling" statue was inspired by, and made from the same mold as, a statue named "Ben Bikin'" in Sparta, Wisconsin, and each year in October there is a bicycle-ride event from Port Byron to Sparta, called the "Will to Ben."

On April 25, 2014, River Action awarded Will B. Rolling the 2014 Eddy Award for Art.

== Education ==
It is in the Riverdale Community Unit School District 100.

== Notable people ==
- Bill Malarkey, MLB pitcher for the New York Giants
- Mary E. Metzgar, temperance activist
- Dan Heim, renowned engineer and philanthropist
