= Adequate Yearly Progress =

U.S. public school metric of standardized test performance

Adequate Yearly Progress (AYP) was a measurement defined by the United States federal No Child Left Behind Act that allowed the U.S. Department of Education to determine how every public school and school district in the country was performing academically according to results on standardized tests. As defined by National Council on Measurement in Education (NCME), AYP was "the amount of annual achievement growth to be expected by students in a particular school, district, or state in the U.S. federal accountability system, No Child Left Behind (NCLB)." AYP has been identified as one of the sources of controversy surrounding George W. Bush administration's Elementary and Secondary Education Act. Private schools were not required to make AYP.

== Description ==
The No Child Left Behind Act of 2001, Sec. 1111 (b)(F), required that "each state shall establish a timeline for adequate yearly progress. The timeline shall ensure that not later than 12 years after the 2001-2002 school year, all students in each group described in subparagraph (C)(v) will meet or exceed the State's standards." These timelines were developed by state education agencies working under guidance from the federal government. The No Child Left Behind Act (NCLB) was the law used as the primary statute governing the federal government's role in education.

The federal government's role in this area was earlier defined under the Elementary and Secondary Education Act (ESEA). The ESEA stated that its purpose was to strengthen and improve educational quality and educational opportunities in the nation's elementary and secondary schools. These goals were to be achieved through financial assistance to local educational agencies for the education of children of low-income families or with disabilities. In 2001, ESEA was modified and renamed the No Child Left Behind Act. To its proponents, the goal of NCLB and the AYP measurement was the strengthening and improvement of the education of elementary and secondary school students.

According to the Department of Education, AYP was a diagnostic tool that determined how schools needed to improve and where financial resources were to be allocated. Former U.S. Secretary of Education Rod Paige wrote, "The statute gives States and local educational agencies significant flexibility in how they direct resources and tailor interventions to the needs of individual schools identified for improvement... schools are held accountable for the achievement of all students, not just average student performance."

The NCLB made provisions for schools that did not demonstrate adequate yearly progress. Those that did not meet AYP for two years in a row were identified as "schools in need of improvement" and were subject to immediate interventions by the State Education Agency in their state. First steps included technical assistance and then, according to the Department of Education, "more serious corrective actions" occurred if the school failed to make AYP.

== Purpose ==
The purpose of the No Child Left Behind Act is to ensure that all children have a fair, equal, and significant opportunity to obtain a high-quality education and reach. This is ensured through the use of academic assessments, teacher preparation and training, rigorous curriculum and adequate and proper instructional material that will in turn aid in performance on the challenging state academic standards that all students are to meet with proficiency. This process is meant to help meet the educational needs of low-achieving children in the nation's poverty-stricken schools, and have every school performing at a national standard level. If this is achieved, then NCLB is said to have "closed the gap". This means that the achievement gap between high- and low-performing schools and children will be less prominent and all will be achieving at the same level and standard throughout the nation. Thus, there will be no child left behind and no schools identified as "schools in need of improvement".

== Details ==
=== Requirements ===
All kindergarten-through-twelfth-grade schools are required to demonstrate AYP in the areas of reading/language arts, mathematics, graduation rates for high schools and districts, and at least one other academic indicator. States are in charge of developing their own criteria for meeting AYP and must submit them for approval. Upon receipt, all criteria provided will be peer reviewed by a panel including representatives, parents, teachers and state and local educational agencies. After review, the states will receive feedback and recommendations from panelists on how to better align their criteria with the statute of No Child Left Behind. These requirements include ten specific guidelines:

1. A single statewide accountability system which is applied to all public schools and local education agencies.
2. The state accountability system must include all public school students.
3. A state's definition of AYP must be based on expectations for growth in student achievement that includes that all students will be proficient in reading and math by 2013–2014.
4. A state must make annual decisions about the achievement of all public schools and local education agencies.
5. All public schools and local education agencies will be held accountable for the achievement of all individual subgroups.
6. A state's definition of AYP must be based primarily on the state's academic assessments.
7. A state's definition of AYP must include graduation rates for high schools, as well as an additional indicator for middle and elementary schools, which may be selected by the states (such as attendance rates).
8. AYP must be based on reading/language arts and mathematics achievement objectives.
9. A state's accountability system must be statistically valid and reliable.
10. To make AYP as a school, a state must ensure that it has assessed at least 95% of students in each subgroup (special education, English language learners, low income, race/ethnicity) enrolled.

Currently, schools are allowed to appeal their AYP findings to their State Education Agency and/or the U.S. Department of Education, if applicable. Appeals have been made in account of standardized test results and data collected by testing companies such as Educational Testing Service.

=== Assessment ===
The NCLB requires that states use standardized assessments in order to measure AYP. These assessments allow state education agencies to develop target starting goals for AYP. After those are developed, states must increase student achievement in gradual increments in order for 100 percent of the students to become proficient on state assessments by the 2013–14 school year. The Illinois Department of Education reports, "The NCLB Act is very prescriptive with regard to how this is to be done – very little flexibility is afforded to states. The same process was used to establish starting points for reading and math." Using assessment data from 2002, the U.S. Department of Education determined what specific percentages of students each state is required to make proficient in each subject area. Special considerations were made for students with limited English proficiency and individuals with disabilities. Once those percentages were determined, each State Department of Education is required to ensure the standards are the same for each public school, district and subgroup of students, irrespective of differences.

=== Successful progress ===
Adequate Yearly Progress requires that every public school complete three requirements annually. Requirements for the percentage of growth is determined on a state-by-state basis. In Illinois those requirements include:

1. At least 95 percent of all students are tested for reading and mathematics.
2. At least 95 percent of all students meet the minimum annual target for meeting or exceeding standards for reading and mathematics.
3. At least 95 percent of all students meet the minimum annual target for attendance rate for elementary and middle schools or graduation rate for high schools.

Additionally, state education agencies must determine the yearly progress of districts and identify districts in need of improvement. Some states, including Missouri, have lowered standards in order to assure the success of their schools and districts meeting AYP.

=== Unsuccessful progress ===
Every state education agency is required to determine which schools do not meet AYP every year. However, a specific designation by the U.S. Department of Education called "Federal school improvement status" applies only to schools that receive Title I funds. State education agencies are required to determine what larger goals are required of every school as they fail to perform annually.

If Title I schools do not meet AYP for two consecutive years, they are placed in "Choice" School Improvement Status, which means they must develop an improvement plan, provide students the option to transfer to a different school and provide them transportation to get there, and use part of their Title I funds for professional development for their teachers and staff. If a school does not make AYP for three consecutive years, they will be in "Supplemental Services" School Improvement Status, which means that in addition to all the "Choice" requirements above, they must also use some of their Title I funds to support students by providing tutoring or after-school programs from a state-approved provider. If a school fails AYP for four years in a row they enter "Corrective Action" Improvement Status, where they must provide both "Choice" and "Supplemental Services", as well as choose one of the following: replace responsible staff, implement a new curriculum, decrease a school's management authority, appoint an external expert to advise the school, or restructure the internal organization of the school. Lastly, if a school fails AYP for five years or more, they must implement one of the following:

- Chartering: closing and reopening as a public charter school
- Reconstitution: replacing school staff, including the principal, relevant to the failure in the school
- Contracting: contracting with an outside entity to operate the school
- State takeovers: turning the school operations over to the state education agency
- Any other major governance restructuring: engaging in another form of major restructuring that makes fundamental reforms

These "other major governance restructuring" strategies were most popular in restructuring schools in 2007–2008, and allow schools to do a variety of things to improve their schools such as narrow the grade range, re-open as a theme school, close the school, create smaller learning communities, or create their own option that is not provided by the Department of Education.

The option of extending NCLB-required sanctions to non-Title I schools does exist; however, there is little current research indicating the implementation of this practice.

== Strategies for improving AYP ==
State education agencies across the United States have developed numerous strategies designed to improve AYP. For instance, steps taken by the Georgia Department of Education include new and more rigorous curriculum, the placement of "graduation specialists" in each high school across the state, comprehensive high school redesign focused on rigorous and relevant education, and integrated technology throughout learning, including the Georgia Virtual School and a free online SAT prep course.

However, outside critics and analysts continue to make their own suggestions on improvements for Adequate Yearly Progress. One example of this is Robert Manwaring (a Senior Policy Analyst at Education Sector), who has many suggestions at the federal, state and local levels. On the federal level, Manwaring believes that No Child Left Behind has been too "hands-off" and that states have been avoiding hard choices such as replacing people in failing schools. He believes intervention in low-performing districts has been too slow to occur. He believes the key is for the federal government to insist on heavier oversight from the states and to propose shorter timelines for quicker actions to be taken with consistently failing schools. He believes the federal government should continue to invest in school improvement, but move from a "formula-driven program" to competitive grants, which will reward schools who make drastic improvement in low-performing schools. He believes that states should be in charge of approving the "other major restructuring plans" (as discussed above) for schools, in order to ensure that they are the right steps to drastically improve student performance. Lastly, he believes Title I funding "comparability" requirements should be changed to make sure that all Title I schools receive an accurate amount of state and local funding.

On the state level, Manwaring believes that states are reluctant to intervene in low-performing schools, and that many state departments lack the experience or capacity to facilitate school turnaround anyway. He suggests that states should identify schools in need of improvement, and require districts to implement an intervention model, during which the state will provide support and monitor progress. He believes they should take control of charter schools by ensuring effective charter oversight, closing low-performing charter schools and providing a fair amount of funding and facilities to successful charters. Lastly, he states should monitor school restructuring closely and be prepared to step in when needed.

On the local level, Manwaring believes that since local school districts are closest to the schools, and have the flexibility necessary to act immediately for students, they should change their policies to ensure that schools have an equal amount of resources, and to reinforce the fact that long-term failure is unacceptable. He suggests that districts push for collective bargaining agreements that allow for improving the staff at low-performing schools, including evaluation systems that allow for the timely removal of poor performing teachers. He also believes that school leaders must be able to make radical changes quickly in order to turn around low-performing schools, with high teacher investment in such policies. Lastly, he believes that school districts need to be prepared to establish new schools in order to close the lowest-performing schools over time.

== Controversy ==
Schools across the country have restructured according to standards dictated by the federal government, rather than local needs. A principal of one such school remarked, "Putting all of the neediest special education students in a few schools seems to create insoluble challenges under No Child Left Behind." Those determinations often come down to the performance of small numbers of students that do not reflect the progress of the whole school. As of 2006, the Program for International Student Assessment (PISA), which performs math and reading assessments of national education systems, does not include special education students as a significant portion of their assessment population.

Criticisms are being met with a series of innovations on the state level. In 2007, the top official of the Ohio Department of Education diagnosed that NCLB "paid no attention to whether students below proficient were making strides, or (those) above proficiency." Ohio is proposing a more subtle "growth model" that would allow schools to better demonstrate progress without jeopardizing past academic accomplishments.

Another controversial concern of NCLB is that it produces unintended consequences on other school subjects. Since AYP is based mostly on standardized state testing on the subjects of math and reading, it is believed that this may cause schools to neglect other subjects. Also, NCLB is thought to provide teachers with the motive to focus energy in the classroom towards the types of questions that students will face on proficiency-based tests as opposed to other questions and topics that should be addressed equally.

The New York State Department of Education is among a group of state education agencies that have voiced support for AYP.

== NCLB effect on teacher quality ==
NCLB was not set in place just to make sure students meet proficiency, but also to encourage teachers to become more qualified and agree to working in different environments depending on need. States have developed a variety of incentives to encourage this. These include tuition benefits, loan forgiveness programs, and housing assistance, to encourage people to enter the profession in general, to better their qualifications, or to work in particular school settings. NCLB required that Illinois stop the use of unqualified teachers and in place offered more training so that teachers could come back under NCLB guidelines. After this, employment of not-fully certified teachers was much less prevalent even in the schools with highest poverty and numbers of minorities, where not-fully certified teachers are most seen.

== Present state of NCLB ==
On January 8, 2002, George W. Bush signed the No Child Left Behind Act. According to Arne Duncan, U.S. Secretary of Education, it has created an artificial goal of proficiency that actually encouraged states to lower their standards to make it easier for students to meet goals and bring the school to meet AYP. Duncan also believes that this kind of system narrows curriculum and mislabels schools as failing, even though they may be demonstrating academic growth in other ways other than state tests. Over the years since NCLB has been in place, 44 states have made strides in raising their standards but are now having to explain why their schools are "failing". To fix this, the secretary of state believes the law needs to be less prescriptive and allow school districts to create their own improvement plans unique to their needs. In 2015, the Obama administration offered states flexibility from NCLB in exchange for their own fair and flexible plans to raise standards. So far, 42 states have shown interest in this system and are currently working with the Department of Education. Congress's efforts to reauthorize NCLB ultimately led in 2015 to the Every Student Succeeds Act, which replaced it, modifying but not replacing provisions related to standardized testing.

== See also ==
- Education in the United States
