= Prairie State Achievement Examination =

School standardized test in Illinois, United States

PSAE logo

The Prairie State Achievement Examination (PSAE) was a two-day standardized test taken by all high school Juniors in the U.S. state of Illinois. On the first day, students take the ACT, and on the second day, a WorkKeys examination and Illinois State Board of Education-developed science examination. The test is no longer administered in Illinois schools; however, it was required for all Illinois High School Students from 2001 to 2014.

== Areas of assessment ==
The PSAE attempted to assess students in the areas of math, reading, science and writing.

== Exemptions ==
Students were required to take the PSAE to achieve a high school diploma, unless they met one of the following requirements:

- The student's Individualized Education Program is incompatible with the PSAE, and the test cannot be modified to comply. In this case, the student takes the Illinois Alternate Assessment instead.
- The student is not proficient in English. In this case the student takes the Illinois Measure of Annual Growth in English instead.
- The student is enrolled in an alternative Education program, including an adult education program, or high school equivalency certificates.
