= West Central Conference (Illinois) =

- Conference: IHSA
- Founded: 1969
- No. of teams: 11
- Region: Western Illinois

The West Central Conference is a high school conference in western central Illinois. The conference participates in athletics and activities in the Illinois High School Association. The conference comprises 11 small public high schools and 1 private high school with enrollments between 120-590 students in Adams, Hancock, McDonough, Pike, and Warren counties.

== History ==
The West Central conference was formed in 1969 with Brown County, Camp Point Central, Carthage, Hamilton, Mendon Unity and Warsaw its charter football members. The first new addition to the football wars was Rushville in 1984. There was no West Central conference for football in 1998, the league's teams participated under the Western Illinois Conference which the North division consisted of Avon/Roseville coop, Carthage, Monmouth Yorkwood, Sciota NW/LaHarpe coop, Spoon River Valley and Stronghurst Southern. The South consisted of Brown County, Camp Point Central coop, Hamilton, Mendon Unity, Rushville and Warsaw coop. The West Central name was restored in 1999 for football with the previous 7 teams plus Beardstown, Pittsfield and the Sciota NW/La Harpe coop forming a 10 team loop. In 2003 Colchester joined the Sciota NW/LaHarpe coop and it was renamed West Prairie. In 2004 Hamilton and Warsaw began the West Hancock coop and the Biggsville Union/Stronghurst Southern coop addition kept this a 10 team circuit. In 2005 both Brown County and the Biggsville/Stronghurst coop left and Pleasant Plains was added. From 2006-07 to 2009-10 the league's football teams played in the West Prairie Trail mega football conference. In 2010 Beardstown and Rushville-Industry left for the Prairieland Conference; and West Prairie left for the Lincoln Trial Conference. In 2010 Macomb, Monmouth-Roseville, Orion, Rockridge, and Sherrard joined from the Olympic Conference; Griggsville-Perry, Liberty, and Payson-Seymour joined from the Pike County Conference, the latter three schools (along with Pittsfield and Western) maintaining concurrent membership in both conferences.

== Member Schools ==
West Central Conference Members (clickable map)

=== North Division ===
School	Location (Population)	Mascot	Colors	School type	2017 9–12 enrollment	Year joined	Joined from
North Division
Central; High School	Camp Point, Illinois (1,132)	Panthers	Black and Gold	Public	241	1969	
Hamilton; High School	Hamilton, Illinois (2,951)	Titans	Red, Black, and White	Public	174	1969	
Illini West High School	Carthage, IL	Chargers	Blue, Orange, and White	Public	346	1969, 2021	Prairieland Conference
Quincy Notre Dame High School	Quincy, Illinois (40,633)	Raiders	Navy, Gold, and White	Private	416 / 686.40 (multiplied)	2013-14 (football only); 2018-19 (full)	Mid-State 6 Conference
Warsaw; High School	Warsaw, Illinois (1,607)	Titans	Red, Black, and White	Public	196	1969	
South Division
Liberty; High School	Liberty, Illinois (516)	Eagles	Red and White	Public	182		
Payson-Seymour High School	Payson, Illinois (1,026)	Indians	Blue and White	Public	152		
Rushville-Industry High School	Rushville, Illinois	Rockets	Purple, Gold, and White	Public	353	1984, 2021	Prairieland Conference
Southeastern; High School	Augusta, Illinois (587)	Suns	Blue and Gold	Public	122		
Unity; High School	Mendon, Illinois (953)	Mustangs	Maroon, White, and Blue	Public	228	1969	
Western; High School	Barry, Illinois (1,318)	Wildcats	Red, Silver, and Black	Public	142		

Sources:IHSA Conferences, IHSA Coop Teams, and IHSA Member Schools Directory.

=== 2017-18 Administration and Leadership ===
President: Cyle Rigg, Southeastern High School

Contact: Matt Long, Central High School

=== Cooperative Arrangements ===
- Hamilton+Warsaw=West Hancock coop for all sports
- Payson-Seymour and Unity coop for football
- Western and Pleasant Hill (Pike County Conference) coop only for football

=== Football ===
The West Central Conference for football has 3 teams. Those 3 teams are: West Hancock(Hamilton/Warsaw), Quincy Notre Dame, and Macomb. The rest of the schools play in nearby conferences. The Payson-Seymour and Unity coop play in the Western Illinois Valley (North) Conference. Also Central plays in the Western Illinois Valley (North) Conference. The Western and Pleasant Hill coop plays in the Western Illinois Valley (South) Conference. Liberty and Southeastern do not play football.

== Former Members ==
School	Location	Mascot	Colors	2017 9-12 Enrollment	Year Departed	Conference Joined
Beardstown; High School	Beardstown, IL	Tigers	Black and Orange	419	2010	Prairieland Conference
Griggsville-Perry High School	Griggsville, Illinois	Tornadoes	Maroon and White	115	2013	Pike County Conference
Orion High School	Orion, Illinois	Chargers	Scarlet and Black	344	2013	Three Rivers Conference (Illinois)
Illini West; High School	Carthage, Illinois	Chargers	Blue, Orange, and White	346	2018	Prairieland Conference
Macomb High School	Macomb, Illinois	Bombers	Orange and Black	581	2021	Prairieland Conference
Monmouth-Roseville High School	Monmouth, Illinois	Titans	Navy, Silver, and White	515	2021	Three Rivers Conference
Pittsfield; High School	Pittsfield, IL	Saukees	Red and Black	316	2013	Pike County Conference
Rockridge High School	Taylor Ridge, Illinois	Rockets	Maroon and White	367	2013	Three Rivers Conference (Illinois)
Rushville-Industry; High School	Rushville, IL	Rockets	Purple and Gold	353	2010	Prairieland Conference
Sherrard High School	Sherrard, Illinois	Tigers	Purple and Gold	475	2013	Three Rivers Conference (Illinois)
West Prairie; High School	Sciota, IL	Cyclones	Black and Silver	162	2010	Lincoln Trail Conference

Sources:IHSA Conferences, IHSA Coop Teams, and IHSA Member Schools Directory.

== Competitive Success ==
The West Central Conference has won 11 state championships in IHSA sponsored athletics and activities, 12 including championships my member school participating in the West Prairie Trail conference, at the conclusion of the 2008-2009 academic year.

=== State Champions ===
Boys Basketball

- Pittsfield (1990-1991 A)
- Warsaw (1996-1997 A)

Boys Football

- Carthage (1995-1996 1A)
- Carthage (1998-1999 1A)
- Carthage (1999-2000 1A)
- Carthage (2000-2001 1A)
- Illini West (2008-2009 3A)*
- Illini West (2010-2011 3A)

*as member of West Prairie Trail Conference

Boys Golf

- Pittsfield (1982-1983 A)

Girls Basketball

- Carthage (1992-1993 A)
- Hancock Central (1991-1992 A)
- West Hancock (Hamilton-Warsaw) (2007-2008 2A)

== Conference Shakeup ==
The makeup of the West Central Conference changed dramatically in 2010. Many member schools departed, many of them for the Prairieland Conference. In their place came the remaining members of the now-dissolved Olympic Conference. The conference then divided into north and south divisions for most athletics and activities.

== See also ==
- List of Illinois High School Association member conferences
