= History of Nauvoo, Illinois =

The history of Nauvoo, Illinois, starts with the Sauk and Meskwaki tribes who frequented the area, on a bend of the Mississippi River in Hancock County, some 53 miles (85 km) north of today's Quincy. They called the area "Quashquema", in honor of the Native American chief who headed a Sauk and Fox settlement numbering nearly 500 lodges. Permanent settlement by non-natives was reportedly begun in 1824 by Captain James White. By 1830, the community was called "Venus", and it was the site of the first post office in the county. In 1834 the name was changed to "Commerce" in anticipation that the town would prosper under the United States's westward expansion.

In late 1839, arriving Mormons bought the small town, and in April 1840 it was renamed "Nauvoo" (a Hebrew word meaning "they are beautiful") by Joseph Smith, the leader and prophet of the Latter Day Saint movement. Nauvoo grew rapidly and was one of the most populous cities in Illinois for a few years. Within two years of Joseph Smith's being killed by a mob in 1844, most of the Mormon population had departed, fleeing armed violence. The majority headed west with the group led by Brigham Young.

In 1849 Icarians moved to the Nauvoo area to implement a utopian socialist commune, which continued until 1856. After the departure of most Icarians, Nauvoo became the largest German-speaking community in Illinois and remained so until the First World War. By that time, the community was religiously diverse, including Catholic, Lutheran, Methodist, and Presbyterian congregations.

Today, a plurality of Nauvoo's population is Methodist or another Christian faith. Nauvoo is an important tourist destination for Latter Day Saints (Mormons) and others who come to see its restored historic buildings and visitor centers.

== Sauk and Meskwaki village (before 1824) ==
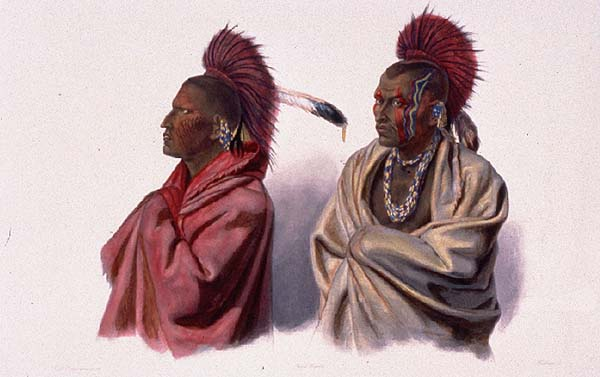
Sac and Fox Indians

A large village of Sauk (Sac) and Meskwaki (Fox) was established along the Mississippi River, near what is now Nauvoo, in the late 18th century; this village had as many as 1,000 lodges. In 1823 or 1824, Captain James White purchased the village from Quashquame, a Sauk leader. White gave Quashquame "a little sku-ti-apo [liquor], and two thousand bushels of corn" for the land. Quashquame's village moved to the west side of the river, merging with an existing Sauk village near what is now Montrose, Iowa.

In 1841, Joseph Smith, living in Nauvoo, was visited by Sauk and Meskwaki from the Iowa village. "The ferryman brought over a great number on the ferry-boat and two flat boats for the purpose of visiting me. The military band and a detachment of Invincibles (part of the Legion) were on shore ready to receive and escort them to the grove, but they refused to come on shore until I went down. I accordingly went down, and met Keokuk, Kis-ku-kosh, Appenoose, and about one hundred chiefs and braves of those tribes, with their families." Smith then discussed the Mormon religion with them, followed by a feast and dancing by the Indians.

== Early European settlement: Venus and Commerce (1824-1839) ==
By 1827 other white settlers had built cabins around the area that Captain James White had purchased from Quashquame. The community came to be called "Venus". Hancock County had been created in 1825 and organized in 1829. By 1829, this area of Hancock County had grown sufficiently that a post office was needed, and this first post office in Hancock County opened in Venus on March 13, 1830. The first postmaster was George Y. Cutler, a graduate of Yale. In 1832 the town was one of the contenders for the new county seat. However, a location closer to the center of the county was selected, and that place became the nearby city of Carthage.

On October 11, 1834, the name Venus was changed to "Commerce" because the settlers felt that the new name better suited their goals. Plans were made for significant redevelopment, and absentee investors A. White and J. B. Teas laid out and plotted the town of Commerce. By 1839, the town had failed to attract settlers, and only a few frame houses had been built. The hopes of commercial success, based on the townsite being beside a necessary portage trail past seasonal rapids, were dashed by the fact that the site and surrounding lands were also most of the time a malarial swamp.

== Nauvoo as the home of the Latter Day Saints (1839-1846) ==
In early 1839, Latter Day Saints were forced to flee Missouri as a result of the 1838 Mormon War and a non-legal proclamation known as Missouri Executive Order 44 issued by Governor Lilburn W. Boggs. They regrouped in Quincy, whose non-Mormon citizens were shocked by the harsh treatment given them in Missouri and opened their homes to the refugees.

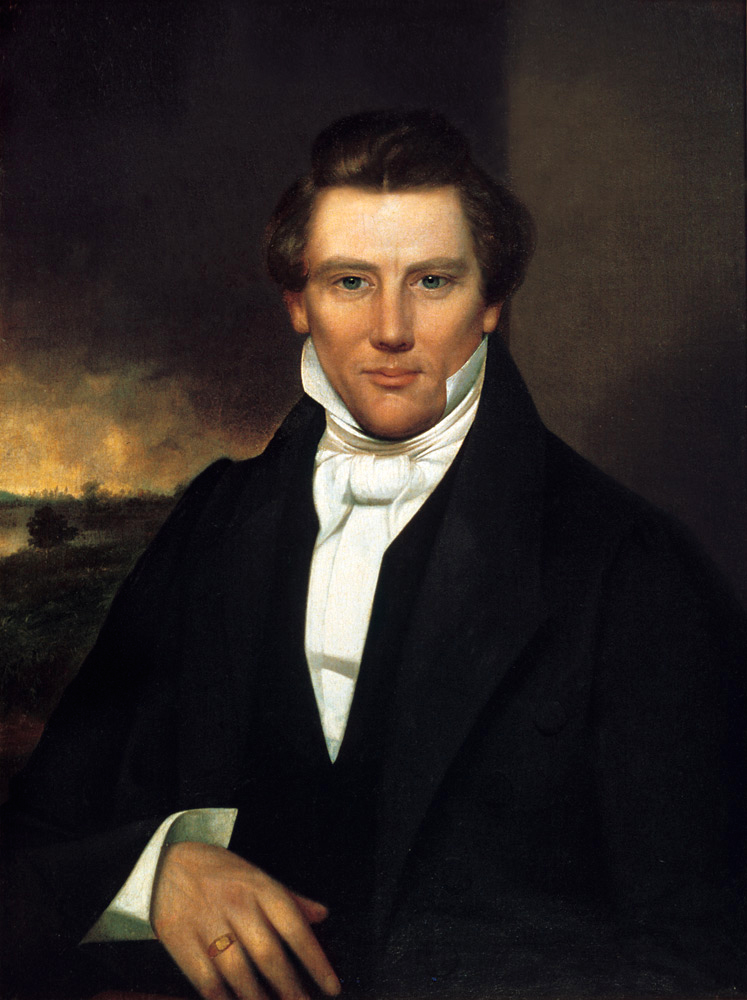
Joseph Smith, Jr.

Joseph Smith, Jr., prophet and president of the Church of Jesus Christ of Latter Day Saints, remained imprisoned in Missouri, but his chief counselor in the First Presidency, Sidney Rigdon, had been released and rejoined the main body of the church in Quincy. Church member Israel Barlow fled Missouri and entered Illinois further north than the main group of Latter-day Saints. Learning from Isaac Galland, a land agent, that a large amount of land was for sale in the Commerce area, he contacted church leaders. Galland approached Rigdon in Quincy and offered church leaders title to land in Hancock County and additional land across the river in the Iowa Territory's Lee County. Church leaders purchased this land as well as the mostly vacant Commerce plat in 1839, and Latter Day Saints began to settle the area immediately.

Physically weak from months of imprisonment, Smith and other leaders were permitted to escape from prison in Missouri. They rejoined the Latter Day Saints in Commerce by May 1839. He renamed the town "Nauvoo", meaning "to be beautiful". Latter Day Saints often referred to Nauvoo as "the city beautiful", or "the city of Joseph".

Despite the name, the site was, at first, an undeveloped swamp. Epidemics of cholera, malaria and typhoid took their toll on the struggling Mormons until the swamp was drained. The smaller community of Commerce had few buildings, so construction began promptly to meet the immediate demand for housing. Elements of Joseph Smith's generalized city plan, known as the "plat of Zion" (first introduced in 1833) were used in the street layout and lot allotments in Nauvoo. The community was characterized by wood frame homes with outbuildings, gardens, orchards and grazing plots on large lots laid out on an orderly grid system. In general, the buildings were detached single-family dwellings reminiscent of New England construction styles, with commercial and industrial buildings in the same pattern.

=== Building up the city ===
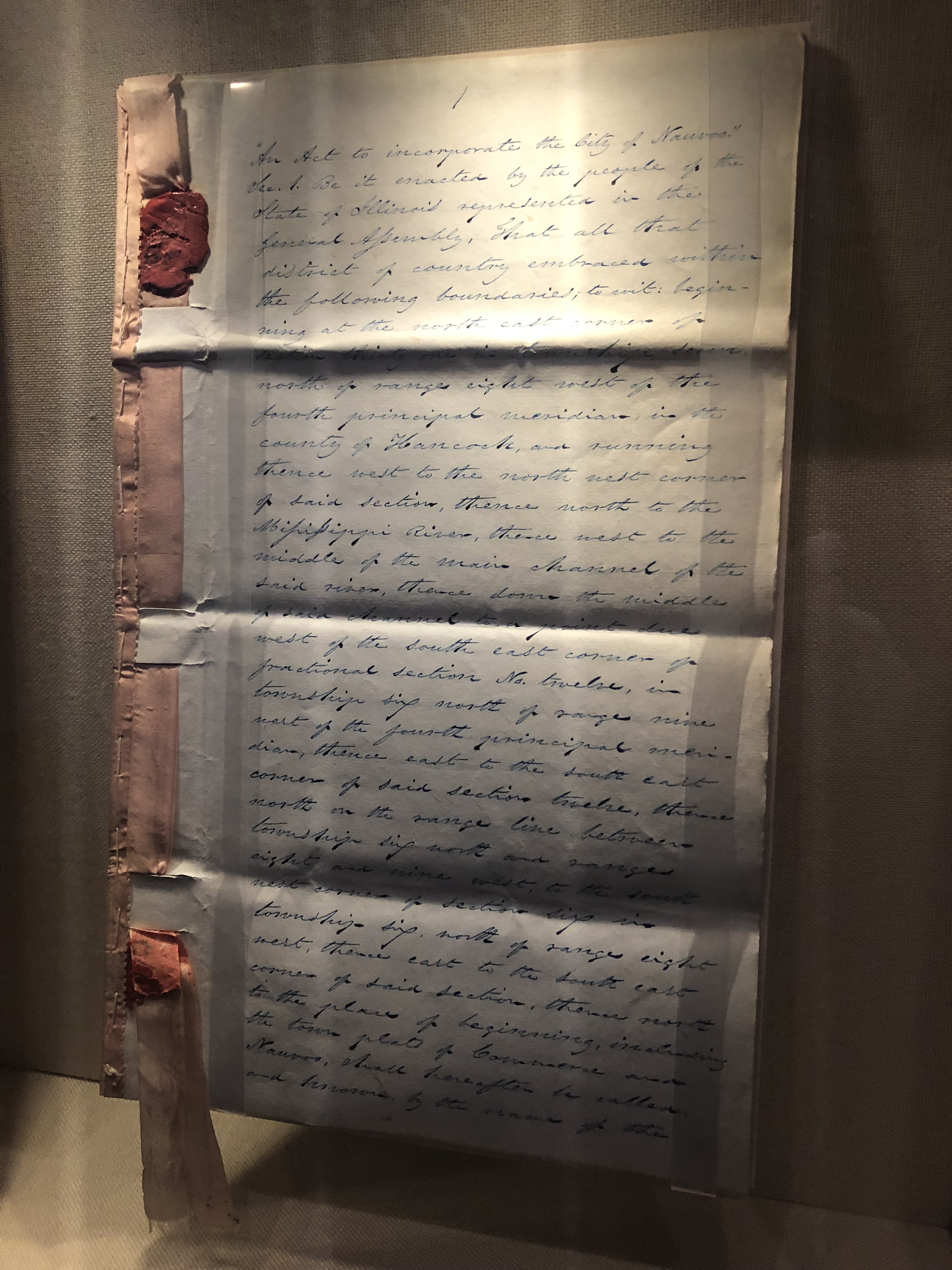
Nauvoo Charter

In the spring of 1840, John C. Bennett, the Quarter Master General of the Illinois State Militia, converted to Mormonism and became Joseph Smith's friend and confidant. Bennett's experience with Illinois government allowed him to help Smith craft a city charter for Nauvoo. After passing both houses of the Illinois Legislature, Governor Thomas Carlin signed the Nauvoo City Charter on December 16, 1840. Based closely on the Springfield, Illinois, charter, the document gave the city a number of important powers, including the establishment of the Municipal Court of Nauvoo, the University of Nauvoo, and an independent militia unit. At the time, the Illinois state government was closely balanced between members of the Democratic party and members of the Whig party. Both hoped to attract Mormon votes, and both were quick to place the charter into effect. After the charter was passed, Bennett was elected Nauvoo's first mayor, and Smith made Bennett a member of the church's First Presidency. A militia unit named the "Nauvoo Legion" was established, and Smith and Bennett were made its commanding generals.

The city grew quickly as Mormons gathered. At its height Nauvoo's population was as large as Quincy's or Springfield's, although it remained smaller than contemporary Chicago, still in its infancy. Many new residents came from the British Isles, as a result of a successful LDS mission established there. The Latter Day Saints published two newspapers in the city, the religious and church-owned Times and Seasons and the secular and independently owned Wasp (later replaced by the Nauvoo Neighbor). Although it mostly existed on paper, the University of Nauvoo was established, with Bennett as chancellor.

The Nauvoo Legion, a militia with 2,000 men, was headed by Joseph Smith, who was given the commission of lieutenant-general by Illinois' Governor Carlin. The Nauvoo militia consisted of a corps of riflemen.

On April 6, 1841, the Nauvoo Legion drilled in a great parade to honor the laying of the cornerstone for a new temple. and Sidney Rigdon gave the dedicatory speech. The foundation of the Nauvoo Temple was 83 by 128 feet (25 by 39 m) and, when finished, its steeple rose to a height of over 100 feet (30 m). Church elder Alpheus Cutler was put in charge of the construction of the ambitious stone structure. Another church committee began construction of a large hotel on the city's Water Street, to be called the Nauvoo House. John D. Lee was put in charge of constructing a meeting hall for the quorums of the Seventies.

In October 1841, a Masonic lodge was established in Nauvoo in the building currently referred to as the Cultural Hall. George Miller, one of the church's bishops, was made its "Worshipful Master" or leader. The lodge admitted far more members than was normal in Masonic practice and quickly elevated church leaders to high roles. This was the most significant time in which the Latter Day Saints were involved in Freemasonry.

=== Developments in the church ===
At the time of Nauvoo's foundation, the church was led by a First Presidency, consisting of a prophet and two counselors. The presiding high council, known as the Nauvoo High Council, led by Nauvoo Stake President William Marks, was next in administrative authority, overseeing the church's legislative and judicial affairs. The church's "Traveling High Council" (or Quorum of the Twelve) led by President Brigham Young oversaw its missionary activities.

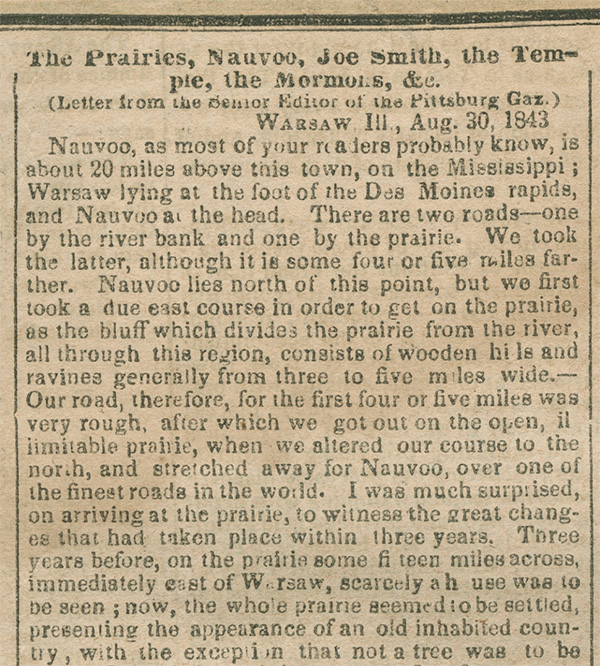
1843 interview of Joseph Smith published in the New York Weekly Express (clipping)

Joseph Smith, Jr., introduced and expanded a number of distinct practices while the Latter Day Saint church was headquartered in Nauvoo. These included baptism for the dead, rebaptism, the Nauvoo-era endowment, and the ordinance of the second anointing. In addition, he created a new inner council of the church — containing both men and women — called the Anointed Quorum.

Although not publicly acknowledged, Smith had been practicing plural marriage for some time, and in Nauvoo he began to teach other leaders the doctrine. Controversy arose because Smith's counselor in the First Presidency and Mayor, John C. Bennett, was caught in adultery (which Bennett considered and referred to as "spiritual wifery" or having multiple "spiritual" wives), claiming that Joseph Smith endorsed it and practiced it himself. Bennett was subsequently expelled from Nauvoo in the summer of 1842, and Smith himself became the city's second mayor. Bennett's fall led to Brigham Young's becoming more prominent among Smith's confidants. Young proved more loyal than Bennett, helping Smith promote the teachings of the Church and the practice of plural marriage with greater discretion.

Another key development was Smith's 1844 establishment of the Council of Fifty based upon his political theory of theodemocracy. An extension of the Mormon belief of an imminent millennium, this council was meant to be a political organization which could immediately fill the roles of purely secular governments which would be destroyed at Christ's Second Coming. The organization was meant to be fully functional only in the absence of secular government, and its governing principles were to be based on the United States Constitution. Reports of the organization, which met in secret, helped fuel rumors of an aggressive theocracy with Joseph Smith as its king. The council remained in existence long after the Nauvoo period.

Nevertheless, Joseph Smith ran for president of the United States in 1844 advocating for a "theodemocracy". He wrote, "I go emphatically, virtuously, and humanely, for a Theodemocracy, where God and the people hold the power to conduct the affairs of men in righteousness."

=== Growing hostility towards Mormons ===
As the Mormon population grew, non-Mormons in Hancock County, especially in the towns of Warsaw and Carthage, felt threatened by the political power of the growing Mormon voting bloc. In Nauvoo, Joseph Smith was not only president of the church, he was mayor, head of the municipal court, and general of the militia. This power base, plus the fact that Mormons benefited from collective group efforts as opposed to the more isolated and independent non-Mormon farmer, caused many non-LDS in the nearby areas to become suspicious and jealous.

Throughout much of the Nauvoo period, officials from Missouri attempted to arrest Smith and extradite him on charges relating to the Mormon War. When he was apprehended, Smith would appeal to the Nauvoo Municipal Court, which would issue writs of habeas corpus and force his release. The court occasionally did the same when non-Mormons tried to arrest Latter Day Saints on other charges. Although the local court exceeded their authority in some of these cases, in at least one instance Governor Ford honored the Nauvoo court's decision to deny extradition. Illinoisans, generally unaware of the Church's and Smith's legal history in Missouri, began to consider this a serious subversion of the judiciary which weakened the legal position of Nauvoo and the Latter Day Saint leadership.

Dissatisfaction with the perceived theocracy also arose from within. In 1844, First Presidency member William Law — an important merchant and counselor to Smith — broke with the church president over both the issue of plural marriage and the legal issues in Nauvoo. Law was excommunicated and founded a reformed church called the True Church of Jesus Christ of Latter Day Saints. He also established a newspaper named the Nauvoo Expositor, which threatened to expose the practice of plural marriage; after the first issue was published, the press was destroyed at Smith' request and no further issues were published.

On June 10, 1844, Smith held a meeting of the city council which, after two full days of meeting, condemned the Expositor as "a public nuisance" and empowered him to order the press destroyed. A portion of the Nauvoo Legion, Smith's militia, marched into the office, wrecked the press and burned every copy of the Nauvoo Expositor that could be found.

The destruction of the press was seen as an opportunity by critics such as Thomas Sharp, whose paper in nearby Warsaw had been openly calling for destruction of the church. Fanned by Sharp and others, public sentiment held that the action was illegal and unconstitutional. Some non-Mormons and disaffected church members in and around Hancock County began to call for Smith's arrest. Smith, his brother Hyrum, and several other church leaders submitted to arrest. While awaiting trial in Carthage, the county seat, under assurance of safety from Illinois governor Ford, Joseph and Hyrum Smith were assassinated when a vigilante mob attacked the jail. (See Death of Joseph Smith.)

=== "Mormon War in Illinois" and the Mormon Exodus ===
Battle of Nauvoo Illinois Mormon War
- Part of the Mormon Wars
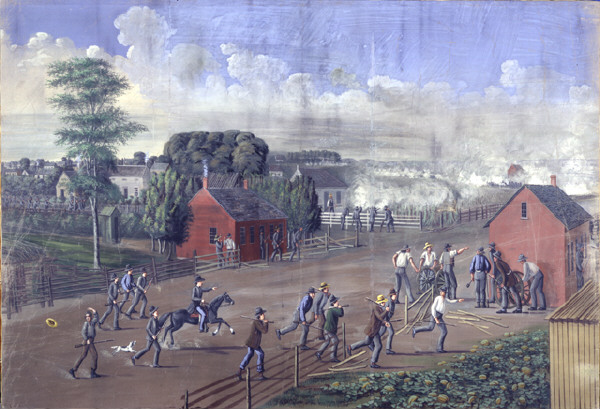
- Depiction of the Battle of Nauvoo, by C.C.A. Christensen
Date	June 10, 1844 – September 16, 1846
Location	Nauvoo, Illinois 40°33′N 91°22′W
Result	Mormon Exodus to Utah Territory

Belligerents
Illinois Militia	Nauvoo Legion

Commanders and leaders
Illinois Governor Thomas Ford; Thomas Brockman	Joseph Smith X Brigham Young; Hosea Stout; Daniel H. Wells

Strength
About 1,000	Less than 150

Casualties and losses
Unknown number wounded	About ten killed, unknown number wounded

After Smith's assassination, the agitation against Mormons continued. The conflict escalated into what has sometimes been called the "Mormon War in Illinois". Opponents of the Mormons in Warsaw and Carthage began to agitate for the expulsion from Illinois of the Latter Day Saints. In October 1844, a great gathering was announced in Warsaw. Although it was purported to be a "wolf hunt", it was known that the "wolves" to be hunted were the Mormons. When Governor Thomas Ford became aware of it, he sent militia troops to disperse the gathering. However, as he later recalled:

The malcontents abandoned their design, and all the leaders of it fled to Missouri. The Carthage Greys fled almost in a body, carrying their arms along with them. During our stay in the county the anti-Mormons thronged into the camp and conversed freely with the men, who were fast infected with their prejudices, and it was impossible to get any of the officers to aid in expelling them.

Vigilante bands continued to roam the county, forcing Latter Day Saints in outlying areas to abandon their homes and gather in Nauvoo for protection.

When the Illinois state legislature met in December 1844, there was great support for the repeal of the Nauvoo Charter. Governor Ford conceded that the charter's privileges had been "much abused" by the Mormons, but he urged that the legislature merely amend the document, saying, "I do not see how ten or twelve thousand people can do well in a city without some chartered privileges." However, on January 29, 1845, the repeal was overwhelmingly passed by a vote of 25–14 in the Senate and 75–31 in the House.

After its legal disincorporation, Nauvoo government and civil institutions were legally dissolved and the church administrative structure operated as a default government. This more theocratic organization was known informally by its residents as the "City of Joseph" while disincorporated. After a succession crisis, Brigham Young gained support from the majority of church members and so controlled Nauvoo. Informal security procedures were established, including what were known as "whittling and whistling brigades". These were made up of Mormon men and boys who "whistled" while "whittling" with large knives held close to any suspicious strangers who entered Nauvoo. According to one witness:

The process of whittling out an officer was as follows: A great tall man by the name of Hosea Stout was the captain of the Whittling society, and he had about a dozen assistants. They all had great bowie knives and would get a long piece of pine board and get up close to the officer and pretend to be cutting the pine board, but would cut over it and cut near the officer. In the meantime, small boys would get tin pans, old bells and all sorts of things to make a noise with and surround the officer. No one would touch or say a word to him, but the noise drowned all that he would say.

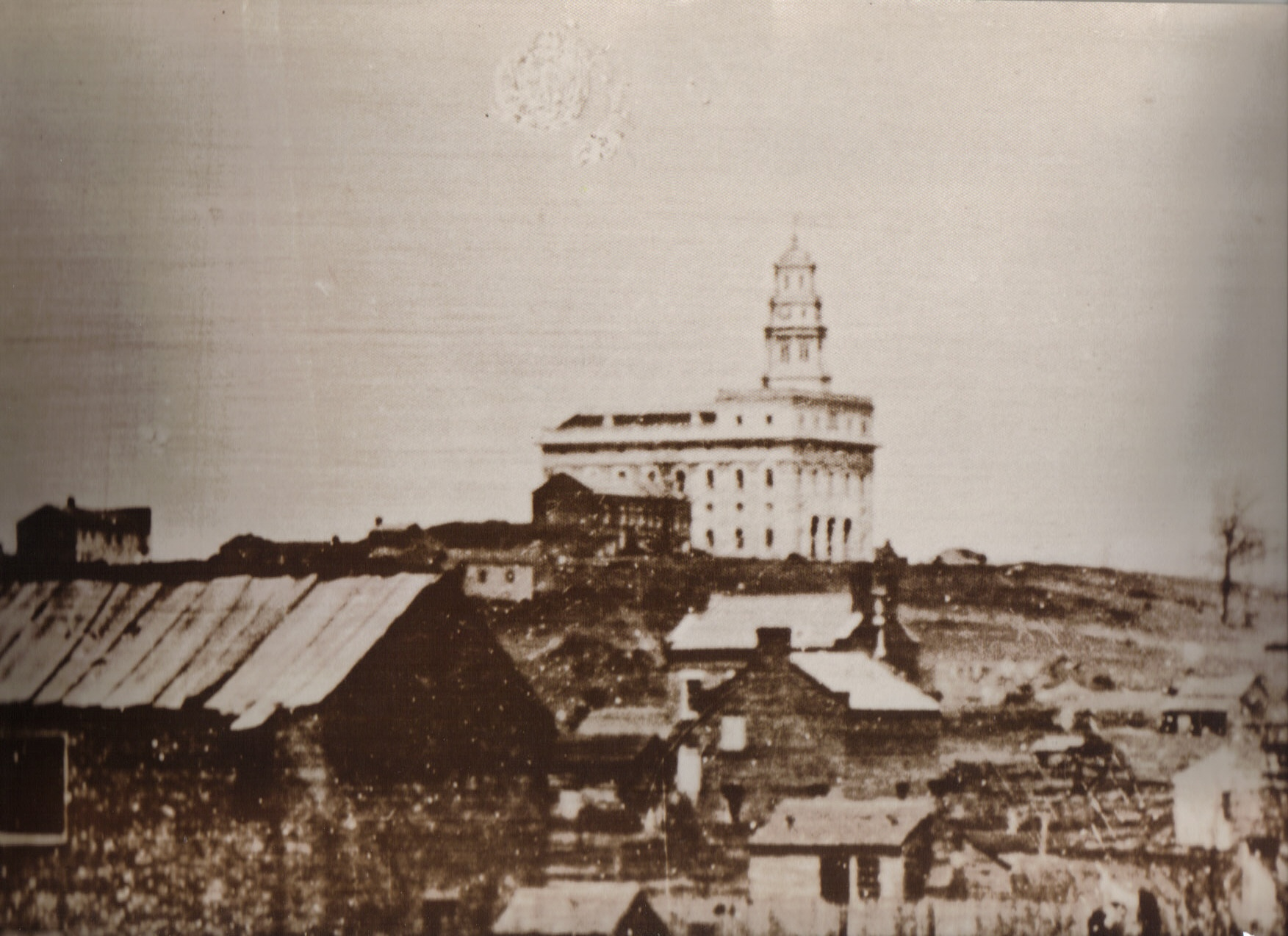
Daguerreotype of the city as it appeared at the time of the Mormon exodus

Nauvoo's population peaked at about this time in 1845; it may have had as many as 12,000 inhabitants (and several nearly as large suburbs)—rivaling Chicago, whose 1845 population was about 15,000.

By the end of 1845 it became clear that no peace was possible between LDS church members and antagonized locals. Mormon leaders negotiated a truce so that the Latter Day Saints could prepare to abandon the city. The winter of 1845-46 saw the enormous preparations for the Mormon Exodus via the Mormon Trail. In early 1846, the majority of the Latter Day Saints left the city. On September 10, 1846, a mob of about 1,000 anti-Mormons besieged Nauvoo. Three of the fewer than 150 Mormon defenders were killed, and skirmishing left wounded on both sides. About a week later, on September 16, Daniel H. Wells and the Mormon leadership of Nauvoo surrendered to the mob and arranged for their people's evacuation from the town and expulsion across the Mississippi River into the Iowa Territory. After the departure of the Mormons, the temple stood until destroyed by arsonists on November 19, 1848. On April 3, 1999, plans were announced to rebuild the temple on the historic site where it once stood. LDS church leaders broke ground for the new temple on October 24, 1999. After construction was completed, the new temple was dedicated for use by members of the LDS church on June 27, 2002.

159 years later, on April 1, 2004, the Illinois House of Representatives unanimously passed a resolution of regret for the forced expulsion of the Mormons from Nauvoo in 1846.

=== Smith family members in Nauvoo after 1846 ===
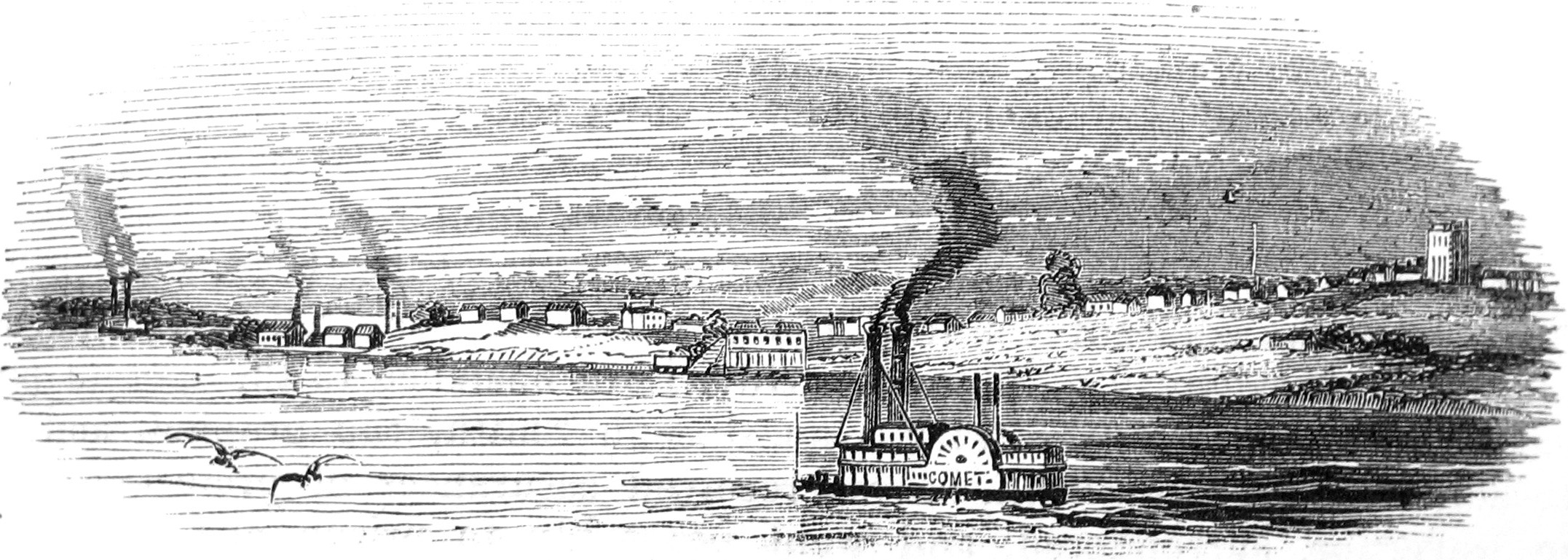
Nauvoo in 1865

Emma Hale Smith, Joseph's widow, continued to live in Nauvoo with her family after the departure of the majority of the Latter Day Saints. In 1860, their son, Joseph Smith III, said he received a revelation to take his place as Prophet/President of a group known as the "Church of Jesus Christ of Latter Day Saints". He continued to live in Nauvoo, which functioned as headquarters of this church (now known as the Community of Christ) until 1865. In 1866, Smith moved from Nauvoo to Plano, Illinois, where the church's printing house had been established. He personally took over the editorship of the Saint's Herald, and Plano became the headquarters of the church. In his final years, members of the church began to move to Independence, Missouri, which Smith's father had designated as the "center place" of the "City of Zion". Latter Day Saints had wanted to return to this theologically important ground since their expulsion in 1833.

== Icarian period (1849-1856) ==
In 1849, Icarians moved to the Nauvoo area to implement a utopian socialist commune based on the ideals of French philosopher Étienne Cabet. At its peak, the colony numbered about 500 members, amounting to nearly half the 1850 census population of 1,130.

In 1851, cholera passed through the area, resulting in the rapid death of more than 50 residents of Nauvoo. The disease apparently came to Nauvoo and western Illinois with French Icarian settlers, who had passed through New Orleans.

Dissension over legal matters led the Icarian community to disband in 1856. Cabet and about 175 followers relocated to St. Louis in Nov. 1856, but Cabet died two days after arriving there. Icarians resettled in East St. Louis, Illinois and in Iowa and California, but descendants of this Icarian colony still live in Hancock and McDonough counties.

The Icarian historical collection is located at the Western Illinois University library in Macomb.

== Germanic period (1856-World War I) ==
After the departure of most French Icarians in 1856, the remaining members of the community were German, Swiss, English, Irish, and Scottish, with Germans composing the largest group. German was spoken around the town more commonly than English, and several churches conducted services in German. During this era, Nauvoo was the largest German-speaking community in Illinois, and it remained so until the First World War.

During the Germanic era, grape production and wine-making thrived in Nauvoo. In January 1866, Nauvoo had 250 vineyards and 23 stone-arched wine cellars. Wine shipments often went to St. Louis, Missouri and St. Paul, Minnesota, in 50 barrel lots. Grape shipments from Nauvoo began in the 1870's, being transported by steam boat, ferry, and rail. The German and Swiss residents of Nauvoo often had three gardens planted around their homes, one for flowers, one for vegetables, and one for fruits and berries. Notable residents from this era include the Swiss memoirist Heinrich Lienhard, who lived for many years in the former home of the Mormon leader Heber C. Kimball.

World War I changed the community, and most of Nauvoo's native-German speaking residents stopped using German in public. The Lutheran Church introduced English language ceremonies in 1915 and stopped German language ceremonies entirely in 1918. The use of German faded away by the Second World War.

== Catholic presence in Nauvoo ==
The early Catholic history of Nauvoo traces to missionary priests traveling the Mississippi River, who stopped in this area in 1820. The early missionaries included Rev. J. C. Alleman and Rev. P. St. Cyr, who visited annually, and Rev. P. Lefevre, who came between 1835 and 1840. From Sept. 1848 to May 1849, the Rev. Fr. Griffith was the first resident pastor of Saints Peter and Paul Church. The church was originally called St. Patrick Church and was located in a storefront at the southeast corner of Wells and Young St. The permanent church edifice was begun in 1867 and dedicated in 1873.

=== St. Mary's Academy and Convent ===
On October 15, 1874, Sister Ottilia Hoeveler and four other sisters came from St. Scholastica Convent in Chicago to start a girls school. Originally named St. Scholastica Academy, it opened on November 2, 1874. Seven girls from Nauvoo and the vicinity were enrolled. In 1875, Hoeveler purchased the Baum Estate. and built a convent.

In 1879 the community became an independent congregation. The name of the school was changed to St. Mary's Academy, and the convent became St. Mary's Convent. The convent was expanded in 1892 and a new school building built in 1897. In 1907 a boys school, Spalding Institute, was built. Spalding did not last long and closed in 1920. In 1925 it was reopened as a new boys school named St. Edmund's Hall. This school closed in 1940, and the building was used as the new convent, named Benet Hall.

In the 1950s and 1960s many new buildings were built: a monastery (1954), high school (1957), and dormitory (1967). Enrollment fluctuated after the 1960s. Due to declining enrollment St. Mary's Academy closed in June 1997. In 2001 the Sisters of St. Benedict, after having built a new monastery in Rock Island, Illinois, departed Nauvoo. St. Mary's was sold and used as the Joseph Smith Academy until the winter semester of 2006 and began to be torn down in September 2007.

Sts. Peter and Paul Elementary continues to provide education for grades PK-6.

== See also ==
- Missouri Executive Order 44 (1838 Missouri)
- Nauvoo Brass Band
- Nauvoo Historic District
