= Winchester High School =

Winchester High School may refer to:

- Winchester High School (Illinois), Winchester, Illinois, United States
- Winchester High School (Kentucky), Winchester, Kentucky, United States
- Winchester High School (Massachusetts), Winchester, Massachusetts, United States
- Winchester High School for Girls, a former name of The Westgate School, Winchester, Hampshire, United Kingdom
