= Rushville High School =

Rushville High School may refer to:

- Gordon-Rushville High School — Nebraska
- Rushville Consolidated High School — Indiana
- Rushville-Industry High School — Illinois
- Rushville High School, a fictional institution located in Rushville, Nebraska in the TV show Lanterns
