= Carrollton High School =

Carrollton High School may refer to:

- Carrollton High School (Carrollton, Georgia) — Carrollton, Georgia
- Carrollton High School (Carrollton, Kentucky) — Carrollton, Kentucky
- Carrollton High School (Carrollton, Illinois) — Carrollton, Illinois
- Carrollton High School (Carrollton, Michigan) — Carrollton, Michigan
- Carrollton High School (Carrollton, Ohio) — Carrollton, Ohio
- Carrollton High School (Texas) — Carrollton, Texas
- Carrollton Area Career Center — Carrollton, Missouri
- West Carrollton High School — West Carrollton, Ohio
