= Winchester High School (Illinois) =

Location
- 200 West Cross Street; Winchester, Scott County, Illinois 62694; United States
- 39.62764°N 90.45961°W

Information
- Type: Public, Coeducational
- School district: Winchester Community Unit School District 1
- Superintendent: Dr. Kevin Blankenship
- NCES School ID: 174266004288
- Principal: Dennis Vortman
- Grades: 9–12
- Gender: coed
- Enrollment: 165 (2022-23)
- Colors: Black, Silver
- Athletics conference: Western Illinois Valley
- Mascot: Cougars
- Website: www.winchesterschools.net/o/wcsd/page/high-school

Winchester High School, or WHS, is a public four-year high school located at 200 West Cross Street in Winchester, Illinois, the county seat of Scott County, Illinois, in the Midwestern United States. WHS serves the communities and surrounding areas of Winchester, Alsey, and Manchester. The campus is located 19 miles southwest of Jacksonville, Illinois, and serves a mixed village and rural residential community.

== Academics ==
Winchester High School did not make Adequate Yearly Progress, with 53% of students meeting or exceeding standards, on the Prairie State Achievement Examination, an Illinois state test part of the No Child Left Behind Act. The average high school graduation rate in the period 1999-2010 was 95.6%.

== Athletics and activities ==
Winchester High School competes in the Western Illinois Valley Conference and is a member school in the Illinois High School Association. Their mascot is the Cougars, with school colors of black and silver. The school has 1 state championships on record in team athletics and activities, Girls Basketball in 2011 (1A).

Due to relatively small student enrollments, WHS combines in a co-op with neighboring Bluffs High School for all athletics. Their combined enrollment is 288. The co-op is called the West Central Co-op, not to be confused with West Central High School, or the West Central Conference. The co-op selected a new mascot and colors when it formed. Prior to the co-op, Winchester High School was the Wildcats with purple and gold, while Bluffs were the Blue Jays with blue and white school colors.

== History ==
Winchester High School incorporated neighboring Alsey High School in approximately 1949. They also incorporated neighboring Manchester High School sometime around that period.
