= Warsaw High School (Illinois) =

Location
- 340 South 11th Street; Warsaw, Illinois 62379; United States; 40.356°N 91.429°W

Information
- Type: Comprehensive public high school
- School district: Warsaw Community Unit School District 316
- Teaching staff: 16.38 (FTE)
- Grades: 9–12
- Enrollment: 175 (2023–2024)
- Student to teacher ratio: 10.68
- Campus type: Rural
- Colors: Red, white, black
- Athletics conference: West Central Conference
- Mascot: Titan
- Website: Warsaw High School

Warsaw High School, or WHS, is a public four-year high school located in Warsaw, Illinois, a small city in Hancock County in the Midwestern United States. WHS serves the communities of Warsaw, Basco, Colusa, Nauvoo, Niota, Sutter and Tioga. The campus is located 35 miles (56 km) north of Quincy, 40 miles (64 km) west of Macomb and serves a mostly rural residential community.

== History ==
Warsaw High School consolidated with Nauvoo-Colusa High School in 2008–2009, which itself existed as a separate high school from 1961 to 2008. Surrounding communities may have also possessed high schools at some time which were consolidated into the current WHS.

== Athletics ==
Warsaw High School competes in the West Central Conference and is a member school in the Illinois High School Association. Due to its small enrollment, WHS co-operates with nearby Hamilton High School for most athletics under the mascot of the Titans and the colors of red, white and black. The school has two state championships on record in team athletics and activities: boys' basketball in 1996-1997 (A) and girls' basketball in 2007-2008 (2A).
