= Hamilton High School (Hamilton, Illinois) =

Location
- 1100 Keokuk Street; Hamilton, Hancock County, Illinois 62341; USA
- Coordinates: 40.390641°N 91.34348°W

Information
- Type: Comprehensive Public High School
- School district: Hamilton Community Consolidated School District 328
- Principal: Brad Gooding
- Teaching staff: 14.25 (FTE)
- Grades: 7–12
- Enrollment: 177 (2023–2024)
- Student to teacher ratio: 12.42
- Campus type: Small city
- Colors: Red, Black, White
- Athletics conference: West Central
- Mascot: Titans
- PSAE average: 58%
- Feeder schools: Hamilton Junior High School
- Website: Hamilton Schools

Hamilton High School, or HHS, is a public four-year high school located at 1100 Keokuk Street in Hamilton, Illinois, a small city in Hancock County. HHS is part of Hamilton Community Unit School District 328, which serves the communities of Hamilton and Elvaston, and also includes Hamilton Junior High School, and Hamilton Elementary School. The campus is located 35 miles west of Macomb, Illinois, and serves a mixed small city, village, and rural residential community. The school does not lie within a metropolitan or micropolitan statistical area.

== Academics ==
In 2009 Hamilton Junior/Senior High School made Adequate Yearly Progress, with 58% of high school students meeting standards, on the Prairie State Achievement Examination, a state test that is part of the No Child Left Behind Act. The school's average high school graduation rate between 1999 and 2009 was 96%.

== Athletics ==
Hamilton High School competes in the West Central Conference and is a member school in the Illinois High School Association. The HHS mascot is the Titans, with school colors of red, black, and white. Hamilton co-ops with neighboring Warsaw High School for most athletics, under the team name West Hancock.
