= Pleasant Hill, Illinois =

Pleasant Hill
- Village
- Location of Pleasant Hill in Pike County, Illinois.
- Coordinates: 39°26′26″N 90°52′31″W
- Country: United States
- State: Illinois
- County: Pike

Area
  - Total: 0.79 sq mi (2.05 km^{2})
  - Land: 0.76 sq mi (1.98 km^{2})
  - Water: 0.023 sq mi (0.06 km^{2})
- Elevation: 459 ft (140 m)

Population (2020)
  - Total: 924
  - Density: 1,207.3/sq mi (466.15/km^{2})
- Time zone: UTC-6 (CST)
  - Summer (DST): UTC-5 (CDT)
- ZIP code: 62366
- Area code: 217
- FIPS code: 17-60534
- GNIS feature ID: 2399692

Pleasant Hill is a village in Pike County, Illinois, United States. As of the 2020 census, Pleasant Hill had a population of 924.

Pleasant Hill is the site of the annual Pike County Fair, as well as the location of the Bi-State Annual Demolition Derby, which was previously held at Mid America Adventure in Eureka, Missouri.

== Geography ==
According to the 2010 census, Pleasant Hill has a total area of 0.805 square miles (2.08 km^{2}), of which 0.78 square miles (2.02 km^{2}) (or 96.89%) is land and 0.025 square miles (0.06 km^{2}) (or 3.11%) is water.

== Demographics ==
Historical population
Census	Pop.	Note	%±
1870	230		—
1880	276		20.0%
1890	310		12.3%
1900	390		25.8%
1910	576		47.7%
1920	433		−24.8%
1930	700		61.7%
1940	706		0.9%
1950	856		21.2%
1960	950		11.0%
1970	1,064		12.0%
1980	1,112		4.5%
1990	1,030		−7.4%
2000	1,047		1.7%
2010	966		−7.7%
2020	924		−4.3%
U.S. Decennial Census

According to the 2010 US Census, Pleasant Hill had 966 people. Among non-Hispanics, this included 949 whites, 3 blacks, 1 of some other race, and 1 from two or more races. The Hispanic or Latino population included 12 people.

There were 406 households, out of which 29.1% had children under the age of 18 living with them, 53.4% were married couples living together, 10.6% had a female householder with no husband present, and 32.5% were non-families. 28.8% of all households were made up of individuals, and 32.0% had someone living alone who was 65 years of age or older. The average household size was 2.38 and the average family size was 2.89.

Of the villages residents, 76.1% were over the age of 18, and 17.2% were 65 years of age or older. The median age was 41.3 years. The gender ratio was 48.8% male and 51.2% female. Among 406 occupied households, 79.1% were owner-occupied and 20.9% were renter-occupied.

As of the census of 2000, there were 1,047 people, 442 households, and 288 families residing in the village. The population density was 1,372.8 inhabitants per square mile (530.0/km^{2}). There were 483 housing units at an average density of 633.3 per square mile (244.5/km^{2}). The racial makeup of the village was 98.66% White, 0.57% from other races, and 0.76% from two or more races. Hispanic or Latino of any race were 0.57% of the population.

There were 442 households, out of which 30.5% had children under the age of 18 living with them, 50.9% were married couples living together, 10.4% had a female householder with no husband present, and 34.8% were non-families. 32.8% of all households were made up of individuals, and 21.9% had someone living alone who was 65 years of age or older. The average household size was 2.32 and the average family size was 2.88.

In the village, the population was spread out, with 25.8% under the age of 18, 5.3% from 18 to 24, 24.4% from 25 to 44, 21.4% from 45 to 64, and 23.2% who were 65 years of age or older. The median age was 40 years. For every 100 females, there were 96.1 males. For every 100 females age 18 and over, there were 83.7 males.

The median income for a household in the village was $25,156, and the median income for a family was $31,029. Males had a median income of $24,583 versus $16,534 for females. The per capita income for the village was $12,682. About 10.8% of families and 17.0% of the population were below the poverty line, including 19.3% of those under age 18 and 21.0% of those age 65 or over.

== Education ==
Pleasant Hill has two schools: an elementary school for Grades Kindergarten - 8 and a High School for Grades 9 - 12.
