= Winchester Community Unit School District 1 =

School district in Illinois, United States

Address
- 149 South Elm Street Winchester, Illinois, 62694; United States

District information
- Grades: K–12
- Superintendent: Dr. Kevin Blankenship
- NCES District ID: 1742660

Other information
- Website: www.winchesterschools.net

Winchester Community Unit School District 1 is a school district in Winchester, Illinois. The district consists of two schools, Winchester Elementary School and Winchester High School. As of 2021 the district is responsible for educating 576 students ranging from Kindergarten to twelfth grade.
