= Griggsville-Perry High School =

Location
- 202 North Stanford Street, PO Box 439; Griggsville, Pike County, Illinois 62340; USA
- 39.710°N 91.725°W

Information
- Type: Comprehensive Public High School
- School district: Griggsville-Perry Community Unit School District 4
- Principal: Jillian Theis
- Teaching staff: 10.30 (FTE)
- Grades: 9–12
- Enrollment: 107 (2023–2024)
- Student to teacher ratio: 10.39
- Campus type: Small city
- Colors: Maroon, White
- Athletics conference: Pike County
- Mascot: Tornadoes/Lady Tornadoes
- Newspaper: The Tornado Times
- Yearbook: Griggoneer
- Feeder schools: Griggsville-Perry Elementary School, Griggsville-Perry Middle School
- Website: Griggsville-Perry High School

Griggsville-Perry High School, or GPHS, is a public four-year high school located at 202 North Stanford Street in Griggsville, Illinois, a small city in Pike County, Illinois, in the Midwestern United States. GPHS serves the communities of Griggsville, Perry, and Fishhook, Maysville, Valley City, Griggsville Landing and Perry Springs. The campus is located 35 miles west of Jacksonville, Illinois, and serves a mixed small city, village, and rural residential community.

== Academics ==
Griggsville-Perry High School offers academic courses in English, Mathematics, History, Computer Sciences, Spanish, Home Economics, Agriculture, Physical Education and more offerings. Extracurricular groups include opportunities such as interscholastic athletics, Future Farmers of America (FFA), Yearbook Staff, Chess Club, Student Council and more. Excelling students have the opportunity to be named to the National Honor Society. The school year traditionally begins in mid-to-late August, and ends in late May or early June.

Potential reference/citation:

== Athletics ==
Griggsville-Perry High School competes in the Western Illinois Valley Conference and is a member school in the Illinois High School Association. The school was previously a longtime member of the Pike County Conference. Their mascot is the Tornadoes, with school colors of maroon and white. The school has no state championships on record in team athletics and activities, but does have one state tournament appearance in boys' basketball in 1928. That year, the Griggsville Maroons finished the tournament in fourth place with a record of 22–8. The Tornadoes have two IHSA Super-Sectional appearances (2011 girls' softball, 2014 boys' baseball).

The district independently operates athletic programs in girls' volleyball, boys' basketball, girls' softball and boys' baseball. Due to their small enrollment, GPHS participates in co-op agreements with nearby Pittsfield High School for football and girls' basketball, and Meredosia-Chambersburg High School for Track & Field.

Several GPHS athletes have gone on to participate in smaller collegiate-level athletic programs since 2000, but the district does boast a pair of athletes at elite levels. Nathan Emrick, a 2002 GPHS graduate and multi-sport star in basketball and baseball, went on to be a four-year member of the Southern Illinois University-Carbondale baseball team. Lew Hitch, born in Griggsville, was a 6'8" forward/center from Kansas State University. Hitch played six seasons (1951–1957) in the National Basketball Association as a member of the Minneapolis Lakers, Milwaukee Hawks, and Philadelphia Warriors. He averaged 5.0 points per game in his career and won two championships with the Lakers.

Prior to the annexation, Griggsville and Perry independently operated school athletic programs, as the Tornadoes and Pioneers, respectively.

== History ==
Griggsville-Perry High School was formed out of the annexation of the Perry school district to the Griggsville school district in 1995. Discussions of a consolidation of the two districts started as early as the early 1970s, with most talks reaching dead ends.
