= Sam Coonrod =

American baseball player (born 1992)

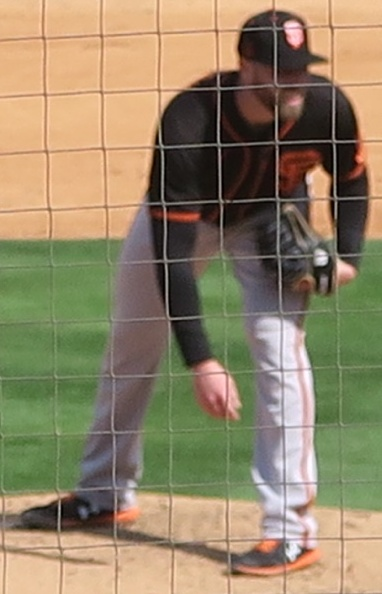
- Sam Coonrod pitching for the Giants

Free agent
- Pitcher
- Born: September 22, 1992 (age 34); St. Louis, Missouri, U.S.
- Bats: Right Throws: Right

MLB debut
- May 26, 2019, for the San Francisco Giants

MLB statistics (through 2023 season)
- Win–loss record: 7–5
- Earned run average: 5.54
- Strikeouts: 101
- Stats at Baseball Reference

Teams
- San Francisco Giants (2019–2020); Philadelphia Phillies (2021–2022); New York Mets (2023)

Samuel Timothy Coonrod (born September 22, 1992) is an American professional baseball pitcher who is a free agent. He has previously played in Major League Baseball (MLB) for the San Francisco Giants, Philadelphia Phillies, and New York Mets.

Coonrod was born in St. Louis, Missouri, and raised in Carrollton, Illinois. He played high school baseball at Carrollton High School, where he helped his team win a state championship his senior season and became the first player in school history to have his jersey number retired. After high school, Coonrod spent three years playing college baseball with the Southern Illinois Salukis of the Missouri Valley Conference. He also played for two collegiate summer baseball teams: the Quincy Gems in 2012 and the Yarmouth-Dennis Red Sox in 2013.

The Giants selected Coonrod in the fifth round of the 2014 MLB draft. He spent the 2014 season with the Arizona League Giants, and continued to rise through the Giants' farm system before making his major league debut in 2019. He struggled during the pandemic-shortened 2020 season, allowing more than one run per inning pitched and recording a 9.82 earned run average in 18 games. Coonrod was traded during the offseason, and began 2021 in the Phillies' bullpen.

== Early life ==
Samuel Timothy Coonrod was born on September 22, 1992, to Tim and Karen Coonrod in St. Louis, Missouri, and was raised in Carrollton, Illinois. Growing up, he was a fan of the St. Louis Cardinals of Major League Baseball (MLB), and attended many of the team's home games at Busch Stadium. He was a shortstop and pitcher for the baseball team at Carrollton High School, posting a career 16–3 win–loss record and a 1.82 earned run average (ERA), with six saves and 212 strikeouts in 119 innings pitched. During his senior season in 2011, Coonrod posted an 11–0 record, including five no-hitters, a 1.35 ERA, and 113 strikeouts in 62 innings pitched. He additionally helped lead the team to a state championship title. In 2015, Coonrod became the first Carrollton baseball player to have his jersey number retired.

== College career ==
Dan Callahan, the coach at the time for the Southern Illinois Salukis of the Missouri Valley Conference (MVC), recruited Coonrod after watching him play at the State Journal-Register Baseball Classic. Coonrod was credited with the win in his college baseball debut, pitching two innings in the Salukis' 4–2 victory over North Florida on February 18, 2012. Coonrod pitched in 18 games and 64 innings in his freshman season at SIU, posting a 3–5 record, a 4.64 ERA, and 54 strikeouts. That summer, he played collegiate summer baseball with the Quincy Gems of the Prospect League, going 2–1 with a 1.80 ERA in three games started and striking out 18 batters in 20 innings pitched.

The following season, Coonrod returned to the Salukis as a starting pitcher. He recorded at least one strikeout per start until February 23, 2013, when he walked a career-high six batters in four innings against Jacksonville State. The following month, on March 22, Coonrod struck out a career-high nine batters in seven innings against Indiana State, an outing that coach Ken Henderson said was "the best he's been all year". He faced Indiana State again in the second game of the 2013 MVC Tournament, giving up three runs and taking the loss in a 5–0 shutout. Coonrod finished his sophomore season with a 3–6 record, a 4.29 ERA, and 68 strikeouts in 15 starts and 79 2/3 innings. That summer, he played for the Yarmouth-Dennis Red Sox of the Cape Cod Baseball League. His Red Sox coach, Scott Pickler, had previously coached Coonrod's future MLB teammates Joe Panik and Buster Posey during their respective times in the Cape Cod League. He pitched in 8 games and 16 2/3 innings with the Red Sox, posting a 1–1 record and 4.86 ERA. Coonrod credited his time with the Red Sox for helping him "mature as a player and be able to handle failure".

As a junior in 2014, Coonrod was one of four Salukis named to the MVC Scholar-Athlete first team. He posted a 2.87 ERA and 77 strikeouts in 84 2/3 innings and 15 games started, in addition to maintaining a 3.48 grade-point average. In three seasons of college baseball, Coonrod posted an 8–17 record, a 3.86 ERA, and 199 strikeouts in 228 1/3 innings pitched.

== Professional career ==
=== Draft and minor leagues ===
On June 6, 2014, the San Francisco Giants selected Coonrod in the fifth round, 148th overall, of the 2014 Major League Baseball draft. He was assigned to the Rookie Arizona League Giants, pitching in 15 games and starting in five, and earning his first professional win against the Arizona League Rangers. He recorded 1–0 record in 2014, with a 3.90 ERA and 25 strikeouts in 27 2/3 innings. In 2015, Coonrod was assigned to the Single-A Augusta GreenJackets of the South Atlantic League, earning his first win on May 21 in a 6–0 shutout of the Asheville Tourists. On July 27, Coonrod was named the South Atlantic League Pitcher of the Week, following a win against the Hickory Crawdads. In his final season start with the GreenJackets on September 6, 2015, Coonrod struck out nine batters in five innings, the second-highest that season, in a 4–2 victory over the Charleston RiverDogs. He finished the season with a 7–5 record and 3.14 ERA in 23 games and 111 2/3 innings.

Coonrod opened the 2016 season with the High–A San Jose Giants of the California League, pitching at the front of the starting rotation. After going 5–0 with a 0.57 ERA and holding his opponents to a .179 batting average in his first month with San Jose, Coonrod was named the California League Player of the Month for May 2016. In June, Coonrod was one of four San Jose Giants named to the 2016 California League All-Star team. That same month, he was promoted to the Double-A Richmond Flying Squirrels of the Eastern League, with whom he went 3–2 with a 3.12 ERA in his first eight starts. For the 2016 season, Coonrod posted a combined 9–6 record, 2.55 ERA, and 94 strikeouts in 24 games and 141 innings with San Jose and Richmond.

Entering the 2017 season, Keith Law of ESPN ranked Coonrod the eighth-best prospect within the Giants system. He spent the season with the Flying Squirrels, going 4–11 with a 4.69 ERA and 94 strikeouts in 24 games and 103 2/3 innings. Coonrod missed most of the 2018 season so that he could recover from Tommy John surgery. He returned from rehab at the end of the season to pitch in 10 games for San Jose, posting a 5.40 ERA.

Coonrod began the 2019 season with the Triple-A Sacramento River Cats, posting a 7.00 ERA in 18 innings. Despite being used as a starting pitcher for most of his career, the River Cats used Coonrod as a reliever.

=== San Francisco Giants (2019–2020) ===
Coonrod was called up to the Giants on May 26, 2019, and made his MLB debut the same day, throwing a perfect eighth inning, including his first major league strikeout, in a 6–2 loss to the Arizona Diamondbacks. He recorded his first MLB win on July 23, pitching in the 13th inning of the Giants' 5–4 win against the Chicago Cubs. He retired three of the Cubs' top hitters—Javier Báez, Kris Bryant, and Anthony Rizzo—in what ended up being the final inning. He finished the season with a 5–1 record, a 3.58 ERA, and 20 strikeouts in 33 games and 27 2/3 innings with the Giants. Coonrod traveled between the River Cats and Giants a total of five times in 2019. The third time that he was called up to the Giants, on July 22, he told The Telegraph, "I was thinking, man I don't want to go back down again. I want to stay up the rest of the year."

During the 2020 season, Coonrod became the subject of attention when he became the only player on either team not to kneel ahead of the playing of "The Star Spangled Banner" before the Giants' game against the Los Angeles Dodgers, a gesture done ahead of some games to indicate support for the Black Lives Matter movement. Coonrod justified his decision by saying that, as a Christian, he "can't kneel before anything besides God".

"I'm a Christian, like I said, and I just can't get on board with a couple of things that I have read about Black Lives Matter. How they lean towards Marxism and they've said some negative things about the nuclear family. I just can't get on board with that."

Giants manager Gabe Kapler said that he spoke with Coonrod after the incident, and that the pitcher would engage in conversations with others about issues of racial justice. Later that season, Coonrod recorded his first major league save, pitching a scoreless ninth inning in a 4–1 win over the Diamondbacks. In his final appearance of the season, on September 25, 2020, Coonrod gave up a walk-off home run to Trent Grisham of the San Diego Padres, causing the Giants to lose 6–5. The following day, Coonrod was placed on the 10-day injured list with a right shoulder strain, keeping him out for the remainder of the season. In 2020, Coonrod posted a 0–2 record and a 9.82 ERA in 18 games and 14 2/3 innings.

=== Philadelphia Phillies (2021–2022) ===
On January 9, 2021, the Philadelphia Phillies acquired Coonrod from the Giants in exchange for right-handed pitcher Carson Ragsdale. Giants president of baseball operations Farhan Zaidi clarified shortly afterwards that the trade was made for "clear and obvious baseball reasons" and was unrelated to Coonrod's comments about the Black Lives Matter movement. The Phillies, who were in the process of rebuilding their bullpen under new president Dave Dombrowski, made a point to acquire power pitchers like Coonrod and José Alvarado. While Coonrod's velocity made him a strong contender for a bullpen position, there were some concerns about his control. Going into the regular season, Coonrod was placed in competition for a bullpen position with left-handed reliever JoJo Romero. Although their statistics were nearly identical throughout spring training, manager Joe Girardi chose Coonrod over Romero because the former threw more strikes. Romero was optioned to the minor leagues on March 28, giving Coonrod a place on the Phillies roster.

Coonrod pitched two scoreless innings in his Phillies debut, a 5–3 win against the New York Mets on April 6, 2021. On April 28, after Cardinals reliever Génesis Cabrera struck both Bryce Harper and Didi Gregorius with pitches, Coonrod began to scream at the Cardinals' dugout and had to be escorted off the field by catcher Andrew Knapp. He said later, "It's just like, once you hit somebody in the face, you kind of need to make sure you don't hit the next guy." On April 30, Coonrod pitched a scoreless ninth inning to earn his first save with the Phillies in a 2–1 win over the Mets. An elbow injury sent Coonrod to the injured list on June 25; a month later, he blamed the injury on a new slider that he had been trying out, inspired by Trevor Bauer. Coonrod was activated off of the injured list on August 25.

On April 14, 2022, Coonrod was placed on the 60-day injured list with a shoulder strain. He was activated on August 15. Coonrod made 12 appearances for Philadelphia in 2022, struggling to a 7.82 ERA with 12 strikeouts in 12.2 innings pitched.

On January 30, 2023, Coonrod was designated for assignment by the Phillies after the signing of Josh Harrison was made official.

=== New York Mets (2023) ===
On February 6, 2023, Coonrod was claimed off waivers by the New York Mets. On April 6, Coonrod was placed on the 60-day injured list with a high-grade lat strain. After pitching 9 1/3 rehab innings for the Single–A St. Lucie Mets and Triple–A Syracuse Mets, Coonrod was activated from the injured list on August 14. He was non-tendered and became a free agent on November 17.

=== Gateway Grizzlies ===
On March 5, 2025, Coonrod signed with the Gateway Grizzlies of the Frontier League. In 6 games 6.1 innings of relief he went 1-0 with a 0.00 ERA with 15 strikeouts and 3 saves.

=== Minnesota Twins ===
On May 29, 2025, Coonrod signed a minor league contract with the Minnesota Twins.

== Pitcher profile ==
Although he has been primarily used as a reliever in his major league career, Coonrod's experience as a starting pitcher gives him an expanded pitch repertoire. In 2020, he used five different pitches, with his primary two being a sinker that averaged 97.9 mph (157.6 km/h) and a four-seam fastball that averaged 98.7 mph (158.8 km/h). He ranked fifth among all pitchers in four-seam fastball velocity for the season, and has been capable of pitching up to 101 mph (163 km/h). Coonrod fills out the rest of his pitching repertoire with an 89 mph (143 km/h) changeup, an 89 mph (143 km/h) slider, and an 82 mph (132 km/h) curveball.

Despite praise for Coonrod's speed, his coaches have noted that difficulty maintaining control and focus on the mound have limited him. Kapler said that the key to turning Coonrod into an elite reliever is "getting in the zone and staying in the zone", rather than the quality of his pitches. After being traded to the Phillies, Coonrod saw an increase in his pitch control, which he attributed to the relatively higher humidity in Philadelphia and in the new spring training location of Clearwater, Florida. He told reporters that the humid weather in those places "helps me with what I throw, the sink and the changeup". Coonrod also said that his Phillies teammate Brandon Kintzler helped him improve his pitching technique going into the 2021 season, particularly with regards to his sinker.

== Personal life ==
Coonrod married his girlfriend Kara Kimball on November 24, 2017, in Fenton, Missouri. He continues to lift weights and practice pitching during the offseason by using the gymnasium at St. John's Elementary School in Carrollton.
