= Warsaw, Illinois =

- City
- Location of Warsaw in Hancock County, Illinois.
- Coordinates: 40°21′42″N 91°25′14″W
- Country: United States
- State: Illinois
- County: Hancock

Area
  - Total: 7.47 sq mi (19.34 km^{2})
  - Land: 6.52 sq mi (16.89 km^{2})
  - Water: 0.95 sq mi (2.46 km^{2})
- Elevation: 656 ft (200 m)

Population (2020)
  - Total: 1,510
  - Density: 231.6/sq mi (89.42/km^{2})
- Time zone: UTC-6 (CST)
  - Summer (DST): UTC-5 (CDT)
- ZIP Code(s): 62379
- Area code: 217
- FIPS code: 17-78942
- GNIS feature ID: 2397200
- Website: warsawillinois.org

Warsaw is a city in Hancock County, Illinois, United States. The population was 1,510 at the 2020 census, a decline from 1,607 in 2010.

== History ==
The city of Warsaw began in 1814, when young Major Zachary Taylor founded Fort Johnson on the eastern bank of the Mississippi River across from the mouth of the Des Moines River. Fort Johnson was occupied only for a few weeks before it was burned. In 1815 another military camp, Fort Edwards, was built nearby at a different location. Warsaw became an important fur trading post and one of the earliest American settlements in northern Illinois.

During the 1840s, Warsaw was a center of opposition to Mormon settlement in Nauvoo and other areas in Hancock County during the conflict sometimes known as the "Mormon Illinois War". The local newspaper at the time, the Warsaw Signal edited by Thomas C. Sharp, was a vocal opponent of Mormon settlement and practices in western Illinois. The Mormons, led by Willard Richards, attempted to establish a settlement at a site just south of Warsaw during this period, but abandoned these plans due to local opposition and other problems.

The city is notable for its well-preserved downtown with a number of remaining historic businesses. Founded by German immigrants, the Warsaw Brewery opened in 1861 and operated for more than 100 years, ending production in 1971. The facility was renovated and reopened in 2006 as a bar and restaurant.

== Geography ==
Warsaw is located in southwestern Hancock County. It is bordered to the west and northwest by the Mississippi River, which forms the state border with Missouri. The community of Alexandria, Missouri lies due west across the Mississippi, Keokuk, Iowa lies 3.5 miles to the northeast, and the city of Hamilton lies approximately six miles to the east-northeast.

According to the 2021 census gazetteer files, Warsaw has a total area of 7.47 square miles (19.35 km^{2}), of which 6.52 square miles (16.89 km^{2}) (or 87.29%) is land and 0.95 square miles (2.46 km^{2}) (or 12.71%) is water.

== Demographics ==
Historical population
Census	Pop.	Note	%±
1860	2,896		—
1870	3,583		23.7%
1880	3,105		−13.3%
1890	2,721		−12.4%
1900	2,335		−14.2%
1910	2,254		−3.5%
1920	2,031		−9.9%
1930	1,866		−8.1%
1940	1,895		1.6%
1950	2,002		5.6%
1960	1,938		−3.2%
1970	1,758		−9.3%
1980	1,842		4.8%
1990	1,882		2.2%
2000	1,793		−4.7%
2010	1,607		−10.4%
2020	1,510		−6.0%
U.S. Decennial Census

=== 2020 census ===
As of the 2020 census, Warsaw had a population of 1,510. The median age was 43.6 years. 23.2% of residents were under the age of 18 and 22.3% of residents were 65 years of age or older. For every 100 females there were 97.9 males, and for every 100 females age 18 and over there were 100.9 males age 18 and over.

0.0% of residents lived in urban areas, while 100.0% lived in rural areas.

There were 651 households in Warsaw, of which 28.3% had children under the age of 18 living in them. Of all households, 49.6% were married-couple households, 20.3% were households with a male householder and no spouse or partner present, and 22.9% were households with a female householder and no spouse or partner present. About 29.0% of all households were made up of individuals and 13.2% had someone living alone who was 65 years of age or older.

There were 762 housing units, of which 14.6% were vacant. The homeowner vacancy rate was 3.7% and the rental vacancy rate was 24.3%. The population density was 202.17 inhabitants per square mile (78.06/km^{2}), and housing units averaged 102.02 per square mile (39.39/km^{2}).

Racial composition as of the 2020 census
Race	Number	Percent
White	1,427	94.5%
Black or African American	4	0.3%
American Indian and Alaska Native	7	0.5%
Asian	11	0.7%
Native Hawaiian and Other Pacific Islander	1	0.1%
Some other race	0	0.0%
Two or more races	60	4.0%
Hispanic or Latino (of any race)	19	1.3%

=== Income and poverty ===
The median income for a household in the city was $53,920, and the median income for a family was $73,092. Males had a median income of $53,472 versus $25,859 for females. The per capita income for the city was $31,066. About 5.3% of families and 10.1% of the population were below the poverty line, including 14.1% of those under age 18 and 6.0% of those age 65 or over.

== Education ==
Warsaw Community Unit School District 316 is the community school district. It operates two schools, Warsaw Elementary School and Warsaw High School.

Before 2008, Warsaw CUSD 316 operated its own junior high school; as of 2008, students at the junior high level attend Nauvoo-Colusa Junior High School in the Nauvoo-Colusa Community Unit School District 325.

== Notable people ==
- William H. Folsom (1815–1901), architect who lived in Warsaw
- John Milton Hay, private secretary to Abraham Lincoln, served as United States Secretary of State
- Benjamin F. Marsh, congressman, buried in Warsaw
