= Western High School (Illinois) =

Location
- 401 McDonough Street; Barry, Pike County, Illinois 62312; United States
- Coordinates: 39.697°N 91.045°W

Information
- Type: Comprehensive Public High School
- School district: Western Community Unit School District 12
- Principal: Connie Thomas
- Teaching staff: 13.53 (FTE)
- Grades: 9–12
- Enrollment: 135 (2023-2024)
- Student to teacher ratio: 9.98
- Campus type: Small city
- Colors: Red, Silver, Black
- Athletics conference: West Central
- Mascot: Wildcats
- Website: Western High School

Western High School, also known as Barry Western, or WHS, is a public four-year high school located at 401 McDonough Street in Barry, Illinois, a small city in Pike County, Illinois, in the Midwestern United States. WHS serves the communities of Barry, Hull, New Canton, and Kinderhook. The campus is located 30 miles southeast of Quincy, Illinois, 45 miles west of Jacksonville, Illinois, and serves a mixed small city, village, and rural residential community.

== Athletics ==
Western High School competes in the West Central Conference and is a member school in the Illinois High School Association. Their mascot is the Wildcats, with school colors of red, silver, and black. The school has no state championships on record in team athletics and activities. Due to their small enrollment, WHS co-ops with nearby Pleasant Hill High School for some athletics.

== History ==
In the Fall of 2007, West Pike High School and Barry High School closed their doors to become united as one high school known as Western High School.
