= Warsaw Community Unit School District 316 =

School district in Illinois, United States

Location
- Warsaw, Illinois Hancock County, Illinois United States

District information
- Type: Public Coed
- Grades: PreK–6, 9–12
- President: Jeff Harness
- Superintendent: Bob Gound
- Schools: Warsaw High School (9–12); Warsaw Elementary school (PreK–6)

Students and staff
- Athletic conference: West Central Conference
- District mascot: Titans
- Colors: Red; Black; White

Other information
- Website: www.warsawschool.com

Warsaw Community Unit School District 316 is a school district headquartered in Warsaw, Illinois.

It operates two schools, Warsaw Elementary School and Warsaw High School. Students at the junior high level grades 7th through 8th attend Nauvoo-Colusa Junior High School in the Nauvoo-Colusa Community Unit School District 325.

== History ==
In 2007 the Warsaw school district and the Nauvoo-Colusa Community Unit School District 325 agreed to a plan in which Nauvoo-Colusa would close Nauvoo-Colusa High School and send its students to Warsaw High. In return the Warsaw district would close its junior high school and send its students to Nauvoo-Colusa Junior High School. On Tuesday February 12, 2008 voters in both districts approved the consolidation plans.
