= Israel Barlow =

Early Latter-day Saint Member and Pioneer (1806–1883)

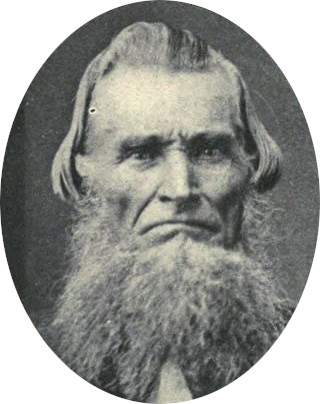
- Born: September 13, 1806; Granville, Massachusetts
- Died: November 1, 1883 (aged 77); Bountiful, Utah
- Known for: Mormon pioneer

Israel Barlow (September 13, 1806 – November 1, 1883) was one of the founders of Nauvoo, Illinois, and a noted early member of the Church of Jesus Christ of Latter-day Saints.

== Early life and conversion ==
Israel Barlow was born in Granville, Massachusetts, on September 13, 1806, to Jonathan Barlow and Annis Gillett. After the death of his father in 1820, his family moved to Mendon, New York. About the age of 24, Barlow first heard the preaching of missionaries of the Church of Christ, the original name of the Church of Jesus Christ of Latter-day Saints. In late 1831 or early 1832, Barlow traveled about 250 miles to Hiram, Ohio, to meet the founder of the new faith, the Prophet Joseph Smith. After talking with him for two or three hours, Barlow said he knew Joseph Smith was a prophet of God. In May 1832, Barlow was baptized into the Church in Mendon by Brigham Young, a recent convert himself and boyhood friend.

== Zion's Camp and Kirtland Temple ==
Israel Barlow and his mother, brothers, and sisters moved from New York to Ohio late in 1832 or early 1833 to join with other Latter-day Saints gathering in the Kirtland area. Barlow participated in the 1834 Zion's Camp march led by Joseph Smith, from Kirtland, Ohio, to Clay County, Missouri, in an unsuccessful attempt to regain land from which the Saints had been expelled by non-Mormon settlers. In 1835, Barlow was ordained a seventy by Sidney Rigdon and was called as one of the inaugural members of the First Quorum of the Seventy. Barlow participated in the construction of the Kirtland Temple and attended its dedication on March 27, 1836.

== Battle of Crooked River ==
In 1837, Israel Barlow and his family moved to Far West, Missouri. Confrontations arose between local citizens and the new Latter-day Saint settlers in Missouri during 1838. On October 25, 1838, Barlow was present at the Battle of Crooked River near Far West where three Latter-day Saints were killed or mortally wounded, including Apostle David W. Patten. Barlow was one of the stretcher bearers who carried Patten back to Far West, where he died that night.

== Seeking refuge and purchase of Nauvoo ==
In late 1838, Apostle Brigham Young counseled Israel Barlow and 32 other Latter-day Saints to leave Far West to search for a place for more than 12,000 homeless Saints to find refuge. While journeying in exile, Barlow would separate from the group and eventually make the acquaintance of Dr. Isaac Galland, the owner of properties near Montrose, Iowa, and Commerce, Illinois. After hearing of the dire plight of the Saints, Galland offered Barlow to sell the Saints the properties on good terms, an offer that Barlow relayed to Church leaders. The Church purchased the properties from Galland and the dispersed Saints once again began to gather together, particularly along the Mississippi River at Commerce, which they renamed Nauvoo in 1840.

== Nauvoo Temple construction ==
Israel Barlow participated in the construction of the Nauvoo Temple. As told by his grandson Joseph S. Barlow, “My grandfather was assisting in the building of the Temple at Nauvoo and was driving a pair of beautiful high-spirited black mares. One day while backing his wagon in at the quarry which was down by the river’s edge, the Prophet came over to him and said ‘Israel, on your next trip, stop and buy yourself a buggy whip,’ to which grandfather assented. On his next trip up town he bought a buggy whip and returned for another load of rock. Backing the team in this time, he attempted to stop them as usual by saying, ‘Whoa,’ to which they paid no attention, but kept backing until Israel, in excitement, was compelled to use the whip which the Prophet had told him to buy. The horses jumped forward and the wagon stopped right at the edge of the quarry, beyond which they would have plunged below. Grandfather frequently told this story as an illustration of what obedience meant. Grandfather accepted everything the Prophet Joseph Smith told him and never questioned ‘why?’ Some would call this blind obedience, but not so. Israel Barlow knew full well the divine calling of the Prophet and bore that testimony to the day of his death.”

== Migration to Salt Lake Valley ==
Two years after Smith's death, the Barlow family left Nauvoo on June 15, 1846, and began their westward journey with other pioneers of the Church of Jesus Christ of Latter-day Saints to the Salt Lake Valley. On September 23, 1848, the family arrived in the Salt Lake Valley, where they spent their first winter at the Old Pioneer Fort. In 1849, Israel Barlow settled in Bountiful, where he would become the first nurseryman in Davis County.

== Missionary and patriarch ==
He served a mission from 1853 to 1855 in England, where he was president of the Birmingham Conference of the Church. In 1882, President of the Quorum of the Twelve Apostles Wilford Woodruff ordained Barlow as a Patriarch.

== Wives ==
Israel Barlow and his wife Elizabeth Haven practiced plural marriage as taught by church leaders. In January 1846, Israel married his first plural wife Elizabeth Barton in Nauvoo. In December 1855, Israel married his third wife Lucy Heap of Lichfield, Staffordshire, England, in Salt Lake City. In May 1865, Israel married his fourth wife Cordelia Maria Dalrymple in Salt Lake City.

== External references ==
- Israel Barlow Family Association
- The Joseph Smith Papers, Israel Barlow
