= Perry, Illinois =

Perry
- Village
- Location of Perry in Pike County, Illinois.
- Coordinates: 39°46′57″N 90°44′42″W
- Country: United States
- State: Illinois
- County: Pike

Area
  - Total: 0.39 sq mi (1.00 km^{2})
  - Land: 0.39 sq mi (1.00 km^{2})
  - Water: 0 sq mi (0.00 km^{2})
- Elevation: 587 ft (179 m)

Population (2020)
  - Total: 314
  - Density: 813.6/sq mi (314.14/km^{2})
- Time zone: UTC-6 (CST)
  - Summer (DST): UTC-5 (CDT)
- ZIP code: 62362
- Area code: 217
- FIPS code: 17-59156
- GNIS feature ID: 2399656

Perry is a village in Pike County, Illinois, United States. As of the 2020 census, Perry had a population of 314.

== History ==
Perry was the birthplace of Mary Baird Bryan, wife of William Jennings Bryan, and the earliest known presentation of Bryan's famous 'Cross of Gold' speech was at a church social at the Perry Presbyterian Church. The text of the speech was printed in the local newspaper, now long-defunct.

Perry maintained a local public high school, graduating its first class in 1879, until it was consolidated with neighboring Griggsville, IL to form the Griggsville-Perry High School

Perry is named for Commodore Oliver Hazard Perry, the hero of the Battle of Lake Erie.

== Geography ==
According to the 2010 census, Perry has a total area of 0.38 square miles (0.98 km^{2}), all land.

== Demographics ==
Historical population
Census	Pop.	Note	%±
1850	402		—
1870	798		—
1880	770		−3.5%
1890	705		−8.4%
1900	642		−8.9%
1910	649		1.1%
1920	491		−24.3%
1930	451		−8.1%
1940	456		1.1%
1950	444		−2.6%
1960	442		−0.5%
1970	451		2.0%
1980	487		8.0%
1990	491		0.8%
2000	437		−11.0%
2010	397		−9.2%
2020	314		−20.9%
U.S. Decennial Census

As of the census of 2000, there were 437 people, 198 households, and 120 families residing in the village. The population density was 1,143.5 inhabitants per square mile (441.5/km^{2}). There were 222 housing units at an average density of 580.9 per square mile (224.3/km^{2}). The racial makeup of the village was 98.86% White, 0.23% Asian, and 0.92% from two or more races.

There were 198 households, out of which 25.8% had children under the age of 18 living with them, 52.5% were married couples living together, 5.6% had a female householder with no husband present, and 38.9% were non-families. 35.4% of all households were made up of individuals, and 23.2% had someone living alone who was 65 years of age or older. The average household size was 2.21 and the average family size was 2.89.

In the village, the population was spread out, with 23.8% under the age of 18, 5.3% from 18 to 24, 22.7% from 25 to 44, 21.7% from 45 to 64, and 26.5% who were 65 years of age or older. The median age was 44 years. For every 100 females, there were 83.6 males. For every 100 females age 18 and over, there were 85.0 males.

The median income for a household in the village was $26,458, and the median income for a family was $35,750. Males had a median income of $27,083 versus $19,375 for females. The per capita income for the village was $20,383. About 18.2% of families and 24.4% of the population were below the poverty line, including 33.3% of those under age 18 and 22.1% of those age 65 or over.
