= Pleasant Hill High School (Illinois) =

Location
- 501 East Quincy Street, PO Box 207; Pleasant Hill, Pike County, Illinois 62366; USA
- Coordinates: 39.441°N 90.868°W

Information
- Type: Comprehensive Public High School
- School district: Pleasant Hill Community Unit School District 3
- Principal: Ryan Lowe
- Teaching staff: 11.39 (FTE)
- Grades: 9–12
- Enrollment: 104 (2023-2024)
- Student to teacher ratio: 9.13
- Colors: Blue, Gold
- Athletics conference: Pike County
- Mascot: Wolves
- Website: Pleasant Hill High School

Pleasant Hill High School, or PHHS, is a public four-year high school located at 501 East Quincy Street in Pleasant Hill, Illinois, a village in Pike County, Illinois, in the Midwestern United States. PHHS serves the community of Pleasant Hill. The campus is located 55 miles southwest of Jacksonville, Illinois, and serves a mixed village and rural residential community.

== Athletics ==
Pleasant Hill High School competes in the Western Illinois Valley Conference and is a member school in the Illinois High School Association. Their mascot is the Wolves, with school colors of blue and gold. PHHS coops with nearby Western High School or Calhoun High School for some athletics (Western for football, Calhoun for track and field).
