= Nauvoo, Illinois =

City in Illinois, United States

- City
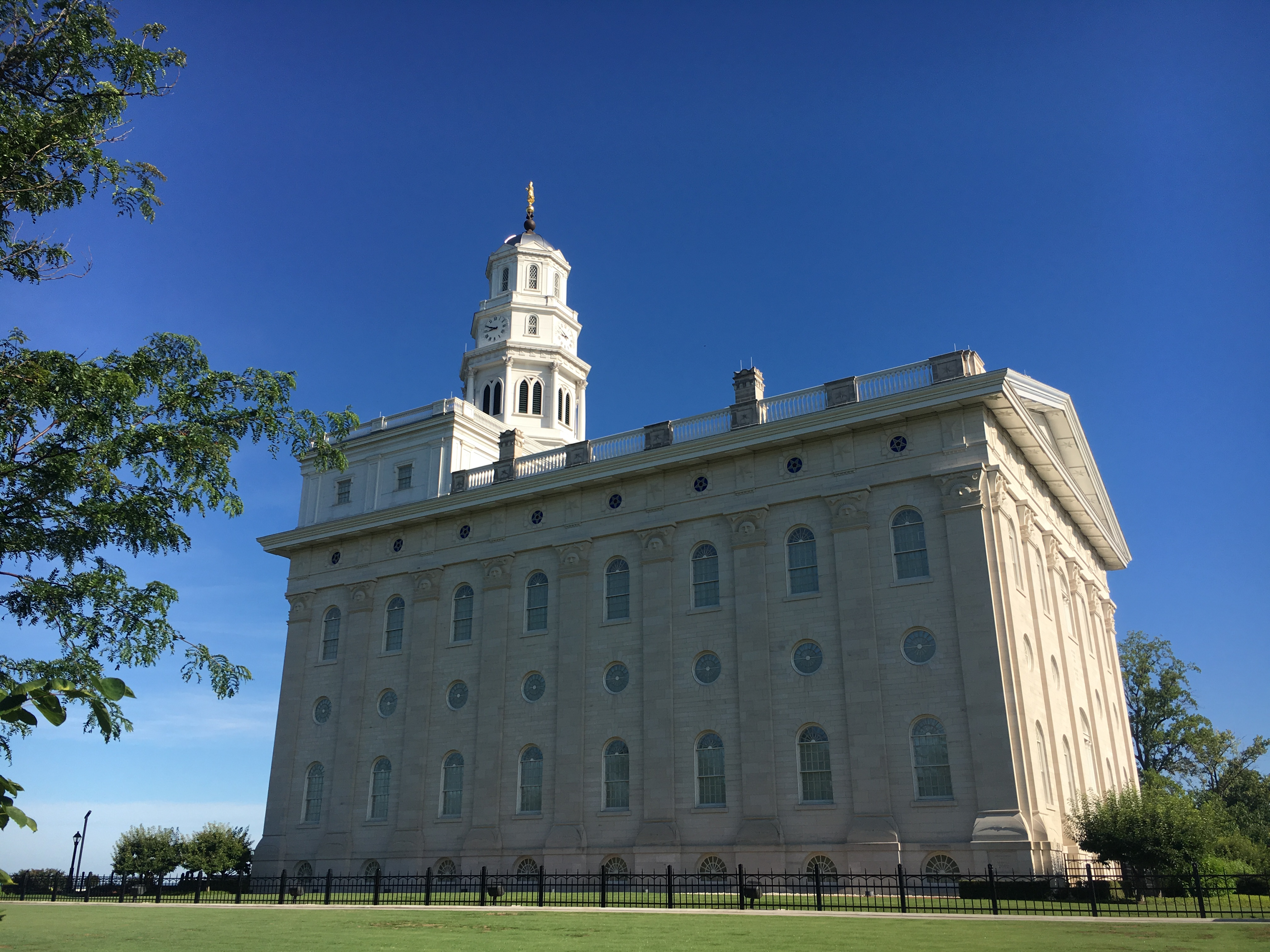
- The rebuilt Nauvoo Illinois Temple, completed in 2002

- Logo

- Location of Nauvoo in Hancock County, Illinois
- Interactive map of Nauvoo, Illinois
- Coordinates: 40°32′40″N 91°22′30″W
- Country: United States
- State: Illinois
- County: Hancock
- Townships: Nauvoo, Sonora
- First settled: 1824
- Founder: James White

Government
  - Mayor: Jim Boyles

Area
  - Total: 4.83 sq mi (12.50 km^{2})
  - Land: 3.39 sq mi (8.77 km^{2})
  - Water: 1.44 sq mi (3.73 km^{2})
- Elevation: 600 ft (180 m)

Population (2020)
  - Total: 950
  - Estimate (2024): 910
  - Density: 280.5/sq mi (108.32/km^{2})
- Time zone: UTC-6 (CST)
  - Summer (DST): UTC-5 (CDT)
- ZIP Code: 62354
- Area code: 217
- FIPS code: 17-51791
- GNIS feature ID: 2395160
- Website: beautifulnauvoo.com

Nauvoo (/ˈnɔːvuː/ NAW-voo; from the Hebrew: נָאווּ, Modern: Navu, Tiberian: Nâwû, 'they are beautiful') is a small city in Hancock County, Illinois, United States, on the Mississippi River near Fort Madison, Iowa. The population of Nauvoo was 950 at the 2020 census. Nauvoo attracts visitors for its historic importance and its religious significance to members of The Church of Jesus Christ of Latter-day Saints, Community of Christ, and other groups stemming from the Latter Day Saint movement, as well as the Icarians. The city and its immediate surrounding area are listed on the National Register of Historic Places as the Nauvoo Historic District.

== History ==
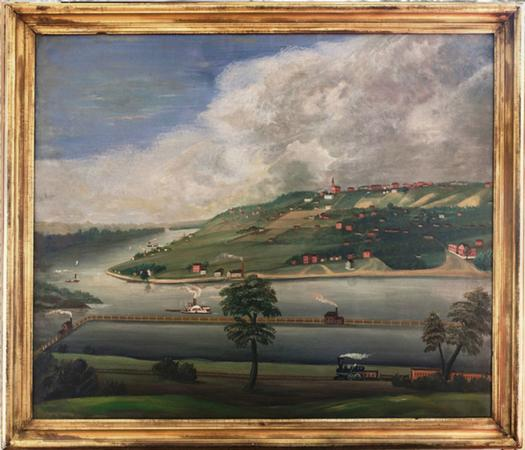
1859 painting by Johann Schroder of Nauvoo from a vantage point of eastern bluffs on the opposite side of the Mississippi River

The area of Nauvoo was first called Quashquame, named in honor of the Native American chief who headed a Sauk and Meskwaki settlement numbering nearly 500 lodges. By 1827, white settlers had built cabins in the area, and by 1830, it was sufficiently settled to warrant a post office, established on March 13 of that year. In 1832, the town, by then called Venus, was one of the contenders for the new county seat. However, the honor was awarded to a nearby city, Carthage. On October 11, 1834, the name Venus was changed to Commerce.

In late 1838, Apostle Brigham Young counseled Israel Barlow and 32 other Latter-day Saints to leave Far West, Missouri, to search for a place for more than 12,000 homeless Saints to find refuge. While journeying in exile, Barlow would separate from the group and eventually make the acquaintance of Dr. Isaac Galland, the owner of land near Montrose, Iowa, and Commerce, Illinois. After hearing of the dire plight of the Saints, Galland offered Barlow to sell the Saints the properties on good terms, an offer that Barlow relayed to Church leaders. The Church purchased the property from Galland in 1839 and the dispersed Saints once again began to gather together, particularly along the Mississippi River at Commerce.

On April 21, 1840, Commerce was renamed Nauvoo by Joseph Smith, who led the Latter-day Saints there to escape conflict with the state government in Missouri following the 1838 Mormon War. The name Nauvoo is derived from the traditional Hebrew language with an anglicized spelling. The word comes from Isaiah 52:7, "How beautiful (נָּאווּ, nâwû) upon the mountains". By 1844 "Nauvoo's population had swollen to 12,000, rivaling the size of Chicago" at the time.

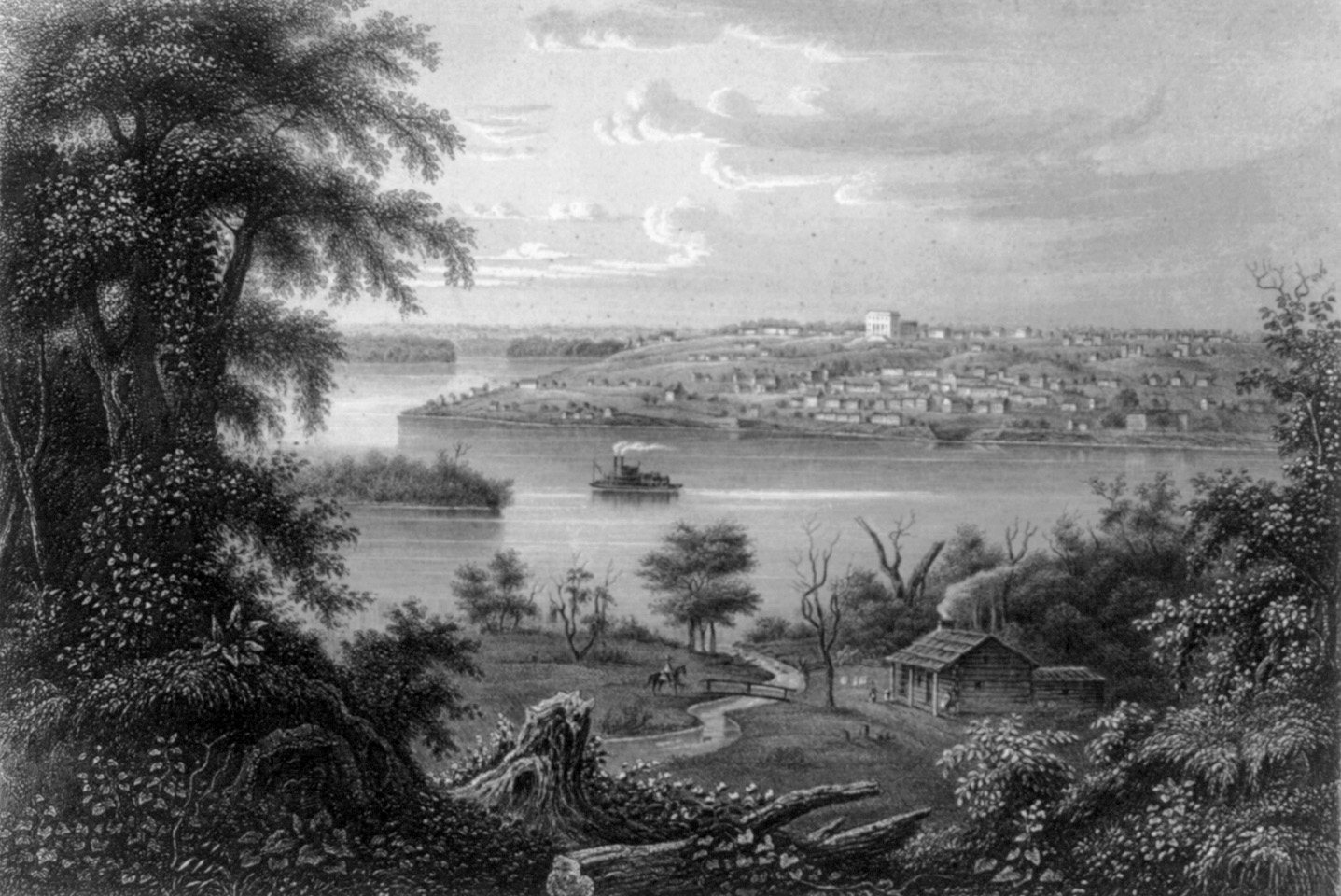
Engraving of Nauvoo, c. 1855

John C. Bennett, Smith's Assistant President and first commander of the Nauvoo Legion, was elected mayor of Nauvoo in 1841. He was replaced by Smith himself in 1842. After Smith's death two years later, continued violence from surrounding non-LDS members forced most Latter-day Saints to leave Nauvoo. Most of these followers, led by Brigham Young, emigrated to the Great Salt Lake Valley.

In 1849, Icarians moved to the Nauvoo area to implement a utopian socialist commune based on the ideals of French philosopher Étienne Cabet. The colony had nearly 500 members at its peak, but the community disbanded in 1856. Cabet and 175 followers relocated to St. Louis in Nov. 1856, and Cabet died two days later.

After the departure of the Icarians, Nauvoo became the largest German-speaking community in Illinois and remained so for fifty years. German was spoken widely in town and in the Catholic, Lutheran, Presbyterian, and Methodist churches. During this period, wine-making and fruit production thrived in Nauvoo. Notable residents from this era included the Swiss memoirist Heinrich Lienhard. During World War I, most of Nauvoo's native-German speaking residents stopped using German in public, and the use of German had entirely faded away by World War II.

=== Nauvoo today ===
On the city's higher ground are the temple, residential areas, and the business district along Mulholland Street (Illinois Route 96), much of it devoted to the needs of tourists and those interested in Latter-Day Saint history. The flatlands are occupied by a small number of 19th-century brick houses and other buildings that have survived the city's vicissitudes, with large empty spaces between them where houses and whole neighborhoods have disappeared.

Community of Christ previously owned much of the southern end of the flatlands as well as several key historic sites in and around Nauvoo, including the Joseph Smith Homestead, the Nauvoo House, the Red Brick Store, the Mansion House, and the Smith Family Cemetery. On March 5, 2024, it was announced that the Church of Jesus Christ of Latter-day Saints had acquired all of these properties with the exception of the Smith Family Cemetery as part of a larger transfer of historically significant properties and artifacts from Community of Christ.

The Church of Jesus Christ of Latter-day Saints also owns most of the other historic sites in Nauvoo, including the homes of Brigham Young, Heber C. Kimball, Jonathan Browning, and other early members of the church, as well as other significant buildings. Most of these sites are open to the public, with demonstrations and displays, and there are self-guided driving tours as well as wagon tours. These tours are free, as are the stage and riverside theatrical productions. There is a large visitors' center complete with two theaters and a relief map of 1846 Nauvoo.

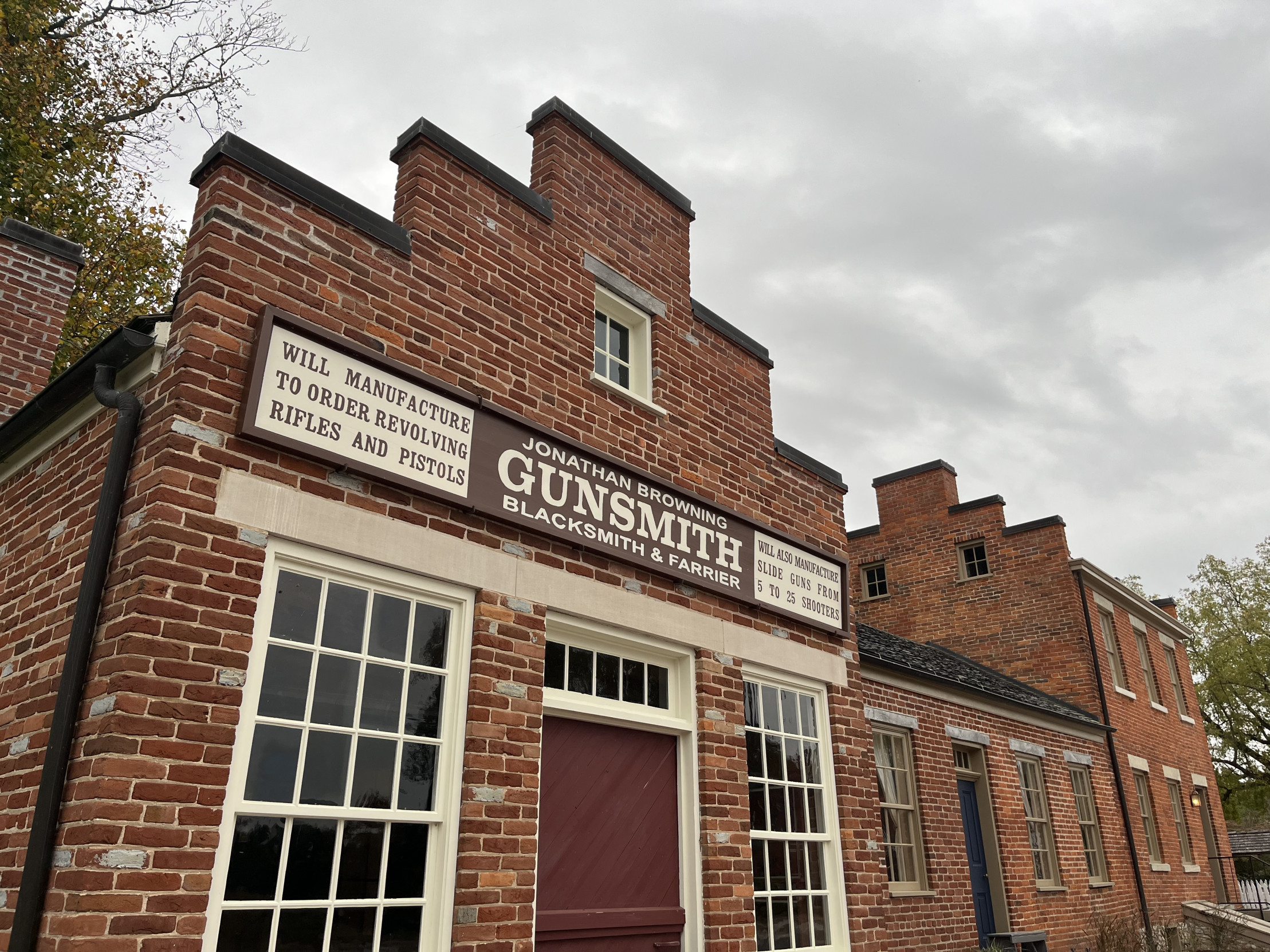
The J. Browning house and gunsmith

The creation of Nauvoo as a historical tourism destination was largely a result of the work of J. LeRoy Kimball (1901–1992). Kimball was a descendant of early LDS leader Heber C. Kimball, and bought his ancestor's home in 1954 with the intention of restoring it. He was the president of Nauvoo Restoration, Inc. from 1962 to 1986.

A Church of Jesus Christ of Latter-day Saints congregation was established in Nauvoo in 1956, from its inception consisting largely of elderly LDS couples serving as missionaries and historical guides. The City of Joseph pageant, an outdoor musical produced by the Church of Jesus Christ of Latter-day Saints, began to run each summer in 1976. A stake was organized with headquarters at Nauvoo in 1979. In addition to the many homes that had been restored, the Relief Society Memorial Garden was dedicated in 1978, featuring statues designed by Dennis Smith and Florence Hansen.

In June 2002, the Church of Jesus Christ of Latter-day Saints completed construction of a new temple on the site of the original temple. The exterior, and much of the interior, is a copy of the original. The exterior matches the original exactly except in three ways: The temple was positioned 12.5 feet (3.8 m) south to allow for parking on the north side, there are two new exterior doors (with an entrance on the north for disabled persons and emergency exits in the basement on the east) and there is a standing Angel Moroni as is seen on most modern temples; the original was an unspecified flying angel, also with a horn in hand but in a horizontal position with the compass, square and flame above.

The rebuilding of the Nauvoo Temple was an occasion of great joy and enthusiasm for members of the Church of Jesus Christ of Latter-day Saints. During the public open house prior to its dedication, 331,849 visitors toured the building. Following Church custom, the temple is now used only by Church members.

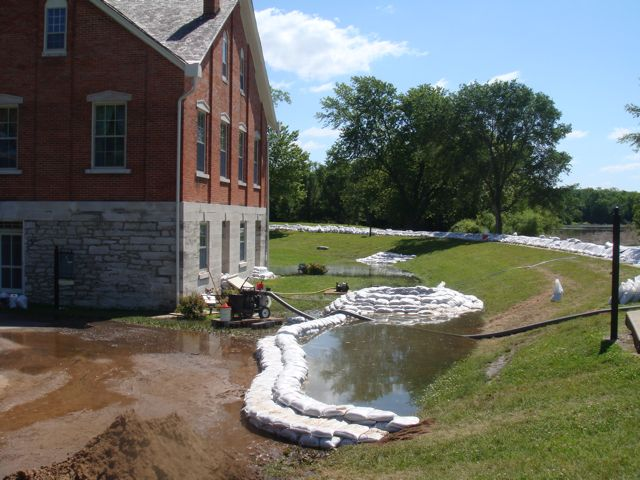
Nauvoo House during the 2008 flood

The work to renovate various sites of historical significance in the area is coordinated by Nauvoo Restoration, Incorporated. NRI is a nonprofit organization supported by the Church of Jesus Christ of Latter-day Saints and Community of Christ, as well as others interested in Nauvoo's history. Due to the work of NRI and its members, Nauvoo has been dubbed the "Williamsburg of the Midwest." In March 2007, Nauvoo was nominated to compete as one of the Seven Wonders of Illinois.

The Church of Jesus Christ of Latter-Day Saints sponsors numerous activities throughout the year in Nauvoo including The Nauvoo Pageant (July/August). The 2020 pageant was cancelled due to the COVID-19 pandemic. The community sponsors the Grape Festival (Labor Day weekend) and Pumpkin Walk (October).

Because most of the city is well above flood level, Nauvoo has not historically had problems when the Mississippi River has risen. In both the floods of 1993 and 2008, very little damage was sustained within city limits. Topography maps show a unique feature of Nauvoo with main street starting at the edge of the Mississippi River on the south side of town and ending at the Mississippi River's edge on the north.

Nauvoo has many places of worship, among them: United Methodist Church, St Peter & Paul Catholic Church, Cornerstone of Zion Church, Living Hope Church (non-denominational), a Community of Christ (formerly known as The Reorganized Church of Jesus Christ of Latter-day Saints), and three wards of the Church of Jesus Christ of Latter-day Saints.

== Geography ==
Situated on a wide bend in the Mississippi River, Nauvoo has most of the historic district in the lower flat lands (called the flats) that are no more than a few feet above the water line. A prominent hill rises as one moves further east, at the apex of which stands the rebuilt Nauvoo Temple. Beginning with the temple, this elevated land (called the uptown) continues flat for many miles eastward.

According to the 2021 census gazetteer files, Nauvoo has a total area of 4.83 square miles (12.51 km^{2}), of which 3.39 square miles (8.78 km^{2}) (or 70.15%) is land and 1.44 square miles (3.73 km^{2}) (or 29.85%) is water.

== Demographics ==
Historical population
Census	Pop.	Note	%±
1840	2,450		—
1850	1,130		−53.9%
1860	1,394		23.4%
1870	1,578		13.2%
1880	1,402		−11.2%
1890	1,208		−13.8%
1900	1,321		9.4%
1910	1,020		−22.8%
1920	972		−4.7%
1930	966		−0.6%
1940	1,088		12.6%
1950	1,242		14.2%
1960	1,039		−16.3%
1970	1,047		0.8%
1980	1,133		8.2%
1990	1,108		−2.2%
2000	1,063		−4.1%
2010	1,149		8.1%
2020	950		−17.3%
U.S. Decennial Census

Non-census data indicates that the population of Nauvoo grew from 100 in 1839 to about 4,000 in 1842, 12,000 in 1844, and stood at about 11,000 in 1845.

=== 2020 ===
As of the 2020 census there were 950 people, 313 households, and 245 families residing in the city. The population density was 196.81 inhabitants per square mile (75.99/km^{2}). There were 645 housing units at an average density of 133.62 per square mile (51.59/km^{2}). The racial makeup of the city was 90.95% White, 0.32% African American, 1.16% Native American, 0.21% Asian, 0.11% Pacific Islander, 1.26% from other races, and 6.00% from two or more races. Hispanic or Latino of any race were 2.84% of the population.

There were 313 households, out of which 33.2% had children under the age of 18 living with them, 67.41% were married couples living together, 7.67% had a female householder with no husband present, and 21.73% were non-families. 17.25% of all households were made up of individuals, and 9.27% had someone living alone who was 65 years of age or older. The average household size was 3.15 and the average family size was 2.88.

The city's age distribution consisted of 25.4% under the age of 18, 7.7% from 18 to 24, 27.6% from 25 to 44, 10.6% from 45 to 64, and 28.7% who were 65 years of age or older. The median age was 38.6 years. For every 100 females, there were 116.4 males. For every 100 females age 18 and over, there were 104.9 males.

The median income for a household in the city was $50,938, and the median income for a family was $53,224. Males had a median income of $38,500 versus $12,708 for females. The per capita income for the city was $20,386. About 23.3% of families and 30.2% of the population were below the poverty line, including 36.9% of those under age 18 and 8.5% of those age 65 or over.

== Economy ==
The Nauvoo Blue Cheese company began to produce cheese in the 1930s. It was discovered the cool, moist wine cellars in the area were ideal for aging cheese. The wine cellars, and the wine-making business originally started by the Icarians, saw a decline in use because of prohibition. In 2003 the Nauvoo Cheese company went out of business when Saputo food company purchased it and relocated to other facilities.

Nauvoo is also home to Baxter's Vineyards, a small family-owned winery begun in 1857 by Emile Baxter that is Illinois' oldest established winery.

Tourism is the major industry in Nauvoo, with Nauvoo Restoration Inc., employing approximately 30, while an estimated 200 missionaries (unpaid) from the Church of Jesus Christ of Latter-Day Saints also provide a boost to local businesses during the tourist season.

Due to lack of sustainable industries, the city has lost several key businesses and services including the High School and multiple small businesses.

== Government and politics ==
Nauvoo city government consists of the mayor and five city council members. The position of city clerk is also elected. Additionally, there are appointed positions for city treasurer, chief of police, and public works positions. Tacy Nelson is the acting mayor with the councilmen as follows: Jim Boyles, Brenda Adkisson, Barb Schafer, Ron Grant and Scott Sumner.

Separate from the city are the Nauvoo Fire Protection District (FPD) and Nauvoo-Colusa School System. The Nauvoo FPD covers all of the city plus the surrounding five townships. The fire department currently provides both fire and EMS coverage for its district. In 1991 the Nauvoo FPD became a BLS non-transporting agency, relying on the county ambulance service to transport patients to local hospitals. Because of longer response times from county-run ambulances, the citizens of the Nauvoo FPD passed a referendum by 74% on April 17, 2007, for ambulance services that would transfer the ambulance tax money to the FPD that was being paid to the county. The Nauvoo FPD completed its fundraising efforts on November 30, 2007, to purchase its ambulance, which entered service in January 2008.

== Education ==
The Nauvoo-Colusa Community Unit School District 325 runs the local elementary and junior high school. Prior to 2008 high school residents attended Nauvoo-Colusa High School from 1961 to 2008. Since 2008 residents have attended Warsaw Community Unit School District 316's Warsaw High School.

Nauvoo is also home to the private Sts. Peter & Paul Catholic School, which provides a faith based education for students from preschool through 6th grade.

== Parks and recreation ==
Nauvoo is home to three parks, one of which is a state park.

- Nauvoo City Park
- Nauvoo Park District
- Nauvoo State Park

== Infrastructure ==
=== Highway ===
- Illinois Route 96 (Mulholland Street)

=== Healthcare ===
Nauvoo is serviced by Memorial Medical Clinic, whose main campus is approximately 24 miles (38.6 km) east of Nauvoo. There is a walk-in clinic located within the city itself.

== Notable people ==
- Elijah Abel
- Israel Barlow
- Samuel Bent
- Lewis C. Bidamon
- Edward Bonney
- Anson Call
- George Q. Cannon
- Duncan Spears Casper
- Sarah M. Cleveland
- Ina Coolbrith
- Lorin Farr
- King Follett
- Robert D. Foster
- Isaac Galland
- Mary Field Garner
- Joseph L. Heywood
- Chauncey L. Higbee
- Francis M. Higbee
- Abraham Hoagland
- David Patten Kimball
- Hiram Kimball
- Martha McBride Knight
- Wilson Law
- Edwin T. Layton
- Heinrich Lienhard
- Lucy Smith Millikin
- Freeman Nickerson
- Stillman Pond
- Samuel W. Richards
- Miles Park Romney
- James Sloan
- Alexander Hale Smith
- David Hyrum Smith
- Elbert A. Smith
- Emma Smith
- Joseph Smith
- Joseph Smith III
- Julia Murdock Smith
- Daniel Spencer
- John Taylor
- Ezra Thayre
- Alice Willard
- Ann Eliza Young

== See also ==
- History of Nauvoo, Illinois
- Nauvoo Neighbor
- Nauvoo Expositor
- Times and Seasons
- The Wasp (newspaper)
- Nauvoo, Alabama – the town was named by Tom Carroll after Nauvoo, Illinois in 1888 during the construction of the Northern Alabama Railway along State Highway 5 in Walker County in central Alabama.
