= Carrollton High School (Carrollton, Illinois) =

Public school in Carrollton, Illinois, United States

Location
- 950 Third Street; Carrollton, Illinois 62016-1506; United States; 39°17′38″N 90°24′09″W

Information
- Type: Public, Coeducational
- Established: 1956
- School district: Carrollton Community Unit School District 1
- Superintendent: Jason Bauer
- Principal: Ronda Smith
- Teaching staff: 18.00 (FTE)
- Grades: 9-12
- Enrollment: 186 (2023-2024)
- Student to teacher ratio: 10.33
- Colors: Kelly Green, White
- Athletics conference: Western Illinois Valley
- Mascot: Hawk
- Website: Carrollton CUSD #1

Carrollton High School is the high school for the Carrollton Community Unit School District #1, located in Carrollton, Illinois.

== History ==
The current high school was dedicated in 1956.

== Athletics ==
Carrollton High School's athletic teams are known as the Hawks and Lady Hawks. Carrollton fields seven athletic teams (football, volleyball, cross-country, boys' and girls' basketball, baseball, softball, and boys' and girls' track and field).

The Hawks are members of the Western Illinois Valley Conference and compete in the IHSA playoffs. In 2001 and 2002, Carrollton won back-to-back girls' basketball state championships. In 2011, the baseball team won the Class 1A State Championship and finished the season with a school best 31-1-1 record.

In 2025, the Lady Hawks softball team set the school record for wins and became the first softball team in school history to win the IHSA Class 1A State Championship, finishing the season with a record of 38 wins and only one loss.

== Notable alumni ==
- Sam Coonrod, major league pitcher for the Philadelphia Phillies
- Sid Simpson, politician
