= Rushville-Industry High School =

Location
- 730 North Congress Street; Rushville, Schuyler County, Illinois 62681; USA
- Coordinates: 40.128°N 90.564°W

Information
- Type: Comprehensive Public High School
- Established: 2005
- School district: Schuyler-Industry Community Unit School District 5
- Principal: Jerry Ellerman
- Faculty: 27.98 (FTE)
- Grades: 9–12
- Enrollment: 283 (2022–23)
- Student to teacher ratio: 10.11
- Campus type: Small Village
- Colors: Purple, Gold
- Athletics conference: West Central
- Team name: Rockets
- Yearbook: Re-Echo
- Website: Rushville-Industry High School Website

Rushville-Industry High School, or RIHS, is a public four-year high school located at 730 North Congress Street in Rushville, Illinois, a small city in Schuyler County, Illinois, in the Midwestern United States. RIHS serves the communities of Rushville, Industry, Browning, Camden, Frederick, and Littleton. The campus is located 25 miles south of Macomb, Illinois, and serves a mixed small city, village, and rural residential community.

== Music ==
The Rushville-Industry High School marching band, the Marching Rockets, participated in the McDonald's Thanksgiving Day Parade in Chicago, Illinois on 25 November 2010.

== Athletics ==
Rushville-Industry High School competes in the Prairieland Conference and is a member school in the Illinois High School Association. The RIHS mascot is the Rockets, with school colors of purple and gold. The school has no state championships on record in team athletics and activities.

== History ==
Rushville and Industry High Schools consolidated to form Rushville-Industry High School in 2005. Surrounding communities may have also possessed high schools at some time which were consolidated into the current RIHS.
