= Isaac Galland =

American merchant, postmaster and doctor

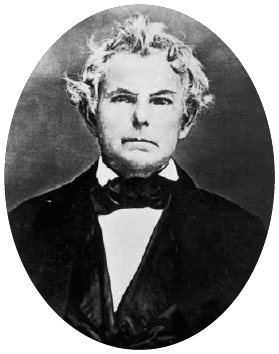
Isaac Galland c. 1850. Anonymous photographer. The Caleb Forbes Davis Collection, Keokuk Savings Bank and Trust Company, Keokuk, Iowa.

Isaac Galland (May 15, 1791 – September 27, 1858) was a merchant, postmaster, land speculator, and doctor. He is best known for selling large tracts of land around Commerce, Illinois, to The Church of Jesus Christ of Latter-day Saints in 1839.

== Early life ==
Galland was born in Somerset, Pennsylvania on May 15, 1791, to Matthew Galland and Hannah Fenno during their move from Norfolk, Virginia, to the Western frontier. He was the second of five children. His siblings were Abel (March 9, 1787 – 1857), Matthew Jr. (1794–1812), David (May 10, 1795 – November 26, 1872), and Mary (Polly) (September 8, 1798 – April 27, 1870). Shortly after his birth, his family relocated to land near Marietta, Ohio, which was located in Ohio's Donation Tract. "The remote location of the Galland homestead did not hinder Isaac's education, since his mother, an educated woman, took on the responsibility of teaching him as much as she could until he was thirteen."

Although little is known of his teenage life before his marriage at 18, according to family tradition, he left Marietta to study at The College of William and Mary in Williamsburg, Virginia, when he was thirteen; some sources indicate that he left home to search for gold in Mexico, was seized by the Spanish government, and spent one year in a Santa Fe prison for "suspicion of evil design."

== Adult life and relocations ==
Galland married Nancy Harris on March 22, 1811, in Madison County, Ohio. Five years later, in 1816, he married his second wife, Margaret Knight, and moved to Washington County, Indiana. He relocated several times, living in Owen County, Indiana, by 1820 and Edgar County, Illinois, shortly thereafter. He moved to Horse Lick Grove, Illinois, in 1824, a place later renamed Fountain Green.

Galland left both women behind when he traveled down the Ohio River to Indiana Territory. He studied and practiced medicine among settlers, which is why he is referred to as "Doctor" Galland in some documents. He learned "several American Indian languages and gained the trust of the Indians, among whom he would live and trade for much of his life". He married his third wife, Hannah Kinney, on October 5, 1826. In 1827, they moved to a remote site on the eastern bank of the Mississippi River at Yellow Banks, the site of present-day Oquawka, Illinois, where he established a trading post.

Two years later, in 1829, Galland sold his post and moved across the river arriving in unorganized U.S. territory, four years before permanent settlement began in Iowa. He established the settlement of Nashville on the west bank of the Mississippi River in what is now Lee County, Iowa, where he practiced medicine and founded a trading post. He promoted Nashville as a future commercial center and when families joined the settlement, Galland hired a teacher and built a log house founding the first school in a what would become Iowa Territory. In the harsh frontier conditions, his wife died, leaving him with two very young children.

In 1832, before the beginning of the Black Hawk War, Galland moved himself and his children back across the river to Fort Edwards at present day Warsaw, Illinois. Galland served as a colonel during the war, and at age 41, married (for a fourth and last time) on April 25, 1833, Elizabeth Wilcox. She was the sister of the commanding officer at Fort Edwards. Galland ran for Illinois state representative in 1834, but lost. In about 1836, he sat for a portrait painted by George Caleb Bingham, now in the collection of the State Historical Museum of Iowa, the same year that he ran for the Illinois state senate. His political opponent accused him of dishonest land dealings and Galland lost again. Galland speculated with land in the Half-Breed Tract in Lee County, Iowa Territory, which was designated for families of white traders who took Indian wives, so the legality of his land titles were questionable. In 1837, he platted the original town of Keokuk, Iowa (then in Wisconsin Territory) with David W. Kilbourne. The same year, Galland founded the newspapers Western Adventurer and Herald of the Upper Mississippi to encourage development. He bought land across the river in Illinois and "laid out the town of Commerce".

In the winter of 1838–39, Galland moved from Fort Edwards to Commerce. He lived with his family "in a large, two-story house" and while there, self-published five issues of the periodical Chronicles of the North American Savage. He sold the town and 19,000 acres of land in the Half-Breed Tract of Iowa to Joseph Smith, leader of the Church of Jesus Christ of Latter-day Saints, after the forced expulsion of its members from Missouri. The Iowa land was called the Zarahemla Stake. Galland also sold Smith many acres on the Illinois side of the Mississippi River, in what was called the Military tract. The Military tract was land given to U.S. Soldiers who had fought in the War of 1812 but were paid in land instead of money. These soldiers sold, often for pennies on the dollar, their land claims to speculators like Galland. Galland then in turned sold land to the Latter-day Saints on extremely liberal payment terms. Smith renamed the settlement on the east side of the river Nauvoo and encouraged Latter-day Saints to settle there.

In July 1839, Galland was baptized into the Church of Jesus Christ of Latter-day Saints and ordained an elder. He served missions to New Jersey and Pennsylvania and traveled east with Hyrum Smith to raise money to construct the Nauvoo Temple. He also served as Smith's secretary for over a year. Within that capacity he transcribed Smith's "'revelations' ... and he came to the conclusion that the prophet's claim to supernatural powers was a fraud." In 1840, he published Galland's Iowa Emigrant to promote immigration to the Iowa Territory. He then published Dr. Galland's Reply to Various Falsehoods, Misstatements, and Misrepresentations Concerning the LDS's Reproach called Mormons in July 1841.

Around 1842, Galland withdrew from the church and moved west across the river a second time. From 1842 to 1853 he resided in Keokuk, Iowa Territory. In 1851, at age 60, Galland ran for the Iowa state legislature, but again lost. His land transactions were scrutinized, and he decided to leave "until his legal difficulties were resolved".

In 1853, Galland moved to Sacramento, California, eventually settling in Petaluma, California, only to return three years later in 1856 to Fort Madison. He died there at the age of 67 years on September 27, 1858.

== Publication ==
Galland wrote a booklet called "Galland's Iowa Emigrant", published in 1840. The preface of the 1950 reprint of this booklet states that "Dr. Isaac Galland ... arrived in what is now Lee County, Iowa in 1829, four years before permanent settlement began in Iowa. ... Despite its brevity, the booklet has the advantage of closer personal observation and longer perspective than" other early works.
