= Hamilton, Illinois =

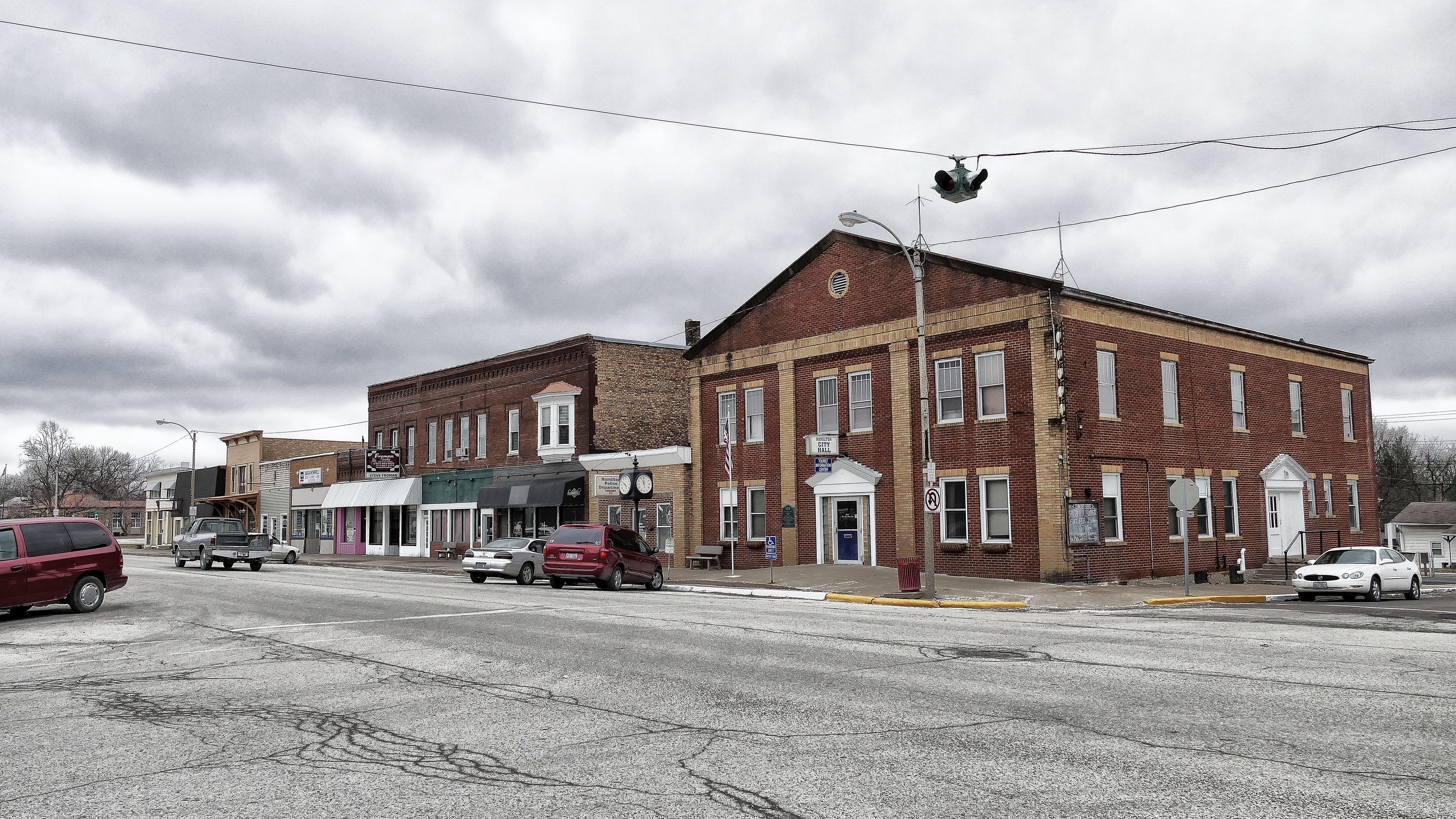
- Broadway Street in Hamilton

- Location of Hamilton in Hancock County, Illinois.

- Location within Illinois Location within the United States
- Coordinates: 40°23′47.42″N 91°20′15.32″W
- Country: United States
- State: Illinois
- County: Hancock

Government
  - Mayor: Bocephus Casey
  - City clerk: Michelle Dorthey
  - Police chief: Mike Boley
  - Fire chief: Steve Helenthal

Area
  - Total: 5.36 sq mi (13.87 km^{2})
  - Land: 3.56 sq mi (9.22 km^{2})
  - Water: 1.80 sq mi (4.65 km^{2}) 33.46%
- Elevation: 495 ft (151 m)

Population (2020)
  - Total: 2,753
  - Density: 773.1/sq mi (298.48/km^{2})
- Time zone: Central Standard
- ZIP code: 62341
- Area code(s): 217, 447
- FIPS code: 17-32434
- GNIS feature ID: 2394275
- Website: www.hamiltonillinois.org

Hamilton is a city in Hancock County, Illinois, United States. The population was 2,753 at the 2020 census, a decline from 2,951 in 2010. The city is located directly across the Mississippi River from Keokuk, Iowa. Hamilton is the largest city in Hancock County.

== History ==
Hamilton was laid out in 1852 by several men in the area, including Samuel Gordon and Bryant Bartlett. Hamilton was officially incorporated as a town in 1854, and then re-incorporated as a city in 1859. Artois Hamilton, for whom the town was named, was also active in the early history of the town.

== Geography ==
According to the 2021 census gazetteer files, Hamilton has a total area of 5.36 square miles (13.88 km^{2}), of which 3.56 square miles (9.22 km^{2}) (or 66.50%) is land and 1.79 square miles (4.64 km^{2}) (or 33.50%) is water.

Hamilton is located across the Mississippi River from Keokuk, Iowa, near Lock and Dam No. 19. The lock has a maximum lift of 38.2 feet, the second highest on the Mississippi River. The dam and Keokuk Energy Center have long been associated with hydroelectric power generation on the river.

== Demographics ==
Historical population
Census	Pop.	Note	%±
1880	1,025		—
1890	1,301		26.9%
1900	1,344		3.3%
1910	1,627		21.1%
1920	1,698		4.4%
1930	1,687		−0.6%
1940	1,642		−2.7%
1950	1,776		8.2%
1960	2,228		25.5%
1970	2,764		24.1%
1980	3,509		27.0%
1990	3,281		−6.5%
2000	3,029		−7.7%
2010	2,951		−2.6%
2020	2,753		−6.7%
U.S. Decennial Census

=== 2020 census ===
As of the 2020 census, Hamilton had a population of 2,753. The median age was 43.0 years. 21.8% of residents were under the age of 18 and 22.6% of residents were 65 years of age or older. For every 100 females there were 93.1 males, and for every 100 females age 18 and over there were 92.5 males age 18 and over.

98.1% of residents lived in urban areas, while 1.9% lived in rural areas.

There were 1,174 households in Hamilton, of which 27.5% had children under the age of 18 living in them. Of all households, 47.0% were married-couple households, 19.5% were households with a male householder and no spouse or partner present, and 26.4% were households with a female householder and no spouse or partner present. About 32.7% of all households were made up of individuals and 17.2% had someone living alone who was 65 years of age or older.

There were 1,308 housing units, of which 10.2% were vacant. The homeowner vacancy rate was 3.3% and the rental vacancy rate was 12.8%.

Racial composition as of the 2020 census
Race	Number	Percent
White	2,569	93.3%
Black or African American	25	0.9%
American Indian and Alaska Native	6	0.2%
Asian	19	0.7%
Native Hawaiian and Other Pacific Islander	0	0.0%
Some other race	30	1.1%
Two or more races	104	3.8%
Hispanic or Latino (of any race)	53	1.9%

=== Income and poverty ===
The median income for a household in the city was $49,566, and the median income for a family was $81,026. Males had a median income of $51,923 versus $29,063 for females. The per capita income for the city was $30,152. About 8.5% of families and 10.4% of the population were below the poverty line, including 21.2% of those under age 18 and 3.9% of those age 65 or over.

== Education ==
Hamilton Community Unit School District #328 consists of Hamilton Elementary, and Hamilton High School.

== Notable people ==
- Russell Lee Arms, actor and singer who starred on Your Hit Parade television program
- John Brock, MLB catcher for the St. Louis Cardinals
- Alden W. Clausen, president of the World Bank and CEO of Bank of America
