= Western Illinois Valley Conference =

- Conference: IHSA
- No. of teams: 14
- Region: West-central part of Illinois

The Western Illinois Valley Conference is a conference of the IHSA located in the west-central part of Illinois.

== Current members ==
A total of 14 school are members.

- Beardstown
- Carrollton
- Concord (Triopia)
- Greenfield
- Hardin (Calhoun)
- Jacksonville (Routt)
- Mt. Sterling (Brown County)
- Pleasant Hill
- White Hall (North Greene)
- Winchester
- Camp Point Central

== Past members ==
- Bunker Hill
- Meredosia
- New Berlin
- Northwestern
- Ursuline
- Illinois School of the Deaf (ISD)
- Virginia
- Bluffs

== Sanctioned sports ==
=== Football ===
For football, the conference is split into North and South divisions. Mendon(Unity) is included in the conference strictly for football.

=== Baseball ===
Just like football, baseball is also split into North and South divisions.

=== Softball ===
Softball is also split into North and South divisions.

=== Track & field ===
The conference meet is held near the end of every season at Illinois College.

== State finishes ==
=== Baseball ===
- Routt 1st (2007-2008 1A)
- Carrollton 1st (2010-2011 1A)
- Brown County 2nd (2021-2022 1A)

=== Boys basketball ===
- West Central 2nd (2010-2011 1A)
- Carrollton 2nd (2011-2012 1A)
- Triopia 4th (2018-2019 1A)
- West Central 1st (2023-2024 1A)

=== Football ===
- Triopia 2nd (1974-1975 1A)
- Triopia 1st (1975-1976 1A)
- Triopia 2nd (1976-1977 1A)
- Routt 1st (1984-1985 1A)
- Calhoun 2nd (1987-1988 1A)
- Greenfield 2nd (1991-1992 2A)
- Calhoun 1st (1992-1993 1A)
- Calhoun 1st (1993-1994 1A)
- Triopia 1st (2008-2009 1A)
- Carrollton 2nd (2014-2015 1A)
- Camp Point 2nd (2018-2019 1A)
- Carrollton 2nd (2021-2022 1A)
- Camp Point 1st (2022-2023 1A)

=== Girls basketball ===
- Carrollton 2nd (1998-1999 A)
- Carrollton 1st (2000-2001 A)
- Carrollton 1st (2001-2002 A)
- Routt 3rd (2006-2007 A)
- Routt 4th (2007-2008 1A)
- West Central 2nd (2008-2009 1A)
- Routt 2nd (2009-2010 1A)
- West Central 1st (2010-2011 1A)
- Carrollton 2nd (2013-2014 1A)
- Calhoun 2nd (2014-2015 1A)
- Calhoun 1st (2015-2016 1A)

=== Softball ===
- Carrollton 4th (1997-1998 A)
- Carrollton 2nd (2001-2002 A)
- Calhoun 4th (2010-2011 1A)
- Calhoun 1st (2015 1A)
- Calhoun 1st (2016 1A)
- Calhoun 4th (2018 1A)

=== Volleyball ===
- A-C Central 2nd (2008-2009 1A)
