= List of Illinois High School Association member conferences =

The following is a list of Illinois High School Association member conferences. Schools that belong to these conferences compete with each other on a local level in athletics and non-athletic activities. As of the 2023-24 school year, there are 70 conferences within the IHSA.

== Current Conferences ==
- Apollo Conference
- Big Northern Conference
- Big Twelve Conference
- Black Diamond Conference
- Cahokia Conference (contains three divisions)
- Central Illinois Conference
- Central State Eight Conference
- Central Suburban League (contains two divisions)
- Chicago Catholic League (contains two divisions)
- Chicago Prep Conference
- Chicago Public High School League (contains ten divisions)
- Chicagoland Christian Conference
- DuKane Conference
- DuPage Valley Conference
- East Central Illinois Conference
- Egyptian Illini Conference
- Fox Valley Conference
- Gateway Metro Conference
- Girls Catholic Athletic Conference
- Greater Egyptian Conference
- Heart of Illinois Conference
- Illini Prairie Conference
- Illinois Central Eight Conference
- Independent School League
- Inter County Athletic Conference
- Interstate Eight Conference
- Kishwaukee River Conference
- Lake Shore Athletic Conference
- Lincoln Prairie Conference
- Lincoln Trail Conference
- Little Illini Conference
- Little Okaw Valley Conference
- Little Ten Conference
- Metropolitan Prep Conference
- Mid-Illini Conference
- Midland Trail Conference
- Mid-Suburban League (contains two divisions)
- Mississippi Valley Conference
- MSM Conference
- National Trail Conference
- Noble Athletic Conference
- North Suburban Conference
- Northeastern Athletic Conference
- Northern Illinois Conference (NIC-10)
- Northern Lake County Conference
- Northwest Upstate Illini Conference (contains two divisions)
- Pike County Conference
- Prairieland Conference
- River Valley Conference
- Sangamo Conference
- South Central Conference (Illinois)
- South Egyptian Conference
- South Seven Conference
- South Suburban Conference
- Southern Illinois River-to-River Conference (with Mississippi and Ohio River divisions)
- Southland Athletic Conference
- Southwest Prairie Conference (contains two divisions)
- Southwest Suburban Conference
- Southwestern Conference
- Three Rivers Conference
- Tomahawk Conference (Illinois)
- Tri-County Conference
- Upstate Eight Conference (contains two divisions)
- Vermilion Valley Conference
- West Central Conference
- West Suburban Conference (contains two divisions)
- Western Big 6 Conference
- Western Illinois Valley Conference (contains two divisions)

== Former conferences ==
- Ambraw Valley Conference (1945-1955)
- Big 8 (1980-1995)
- Big Rivers Conference (football-only) (1999-2012)
- Bi-County Conference (1917-1919)
- Bi-County Conference (1970s-1998)
- Blackhawk Conference (West) (1934-1990)
- Blackhawk Conference (North) (1947-1972)
- Bureau Valley Conference (1970s-1990s)
- Capitol Conference (1964-1982)
- Cenois Conference (1963-1969)
- Central Conference (1956-1958)
- Central Egyptian Conference (1929-1940)
- Chicagoland Prep Conference (1961-1969)
- Coal Belt Conference (1946-1956)
- Cook County High School League (1889–1913)
- Corn Belt Conference (1950–2017)
- Des Plaines Valley Conference (1963-1985)
- East Okaw Conference (1981-1995)
- East Suburban Catholic Conference (1974-2026)
- Eastern Illinois Conference (1952-1969)
- Four Rivers Conference (2000-2006)
- Fox Valley Conference (1952-1966)
- Gateway East Conference (1979-1983)
- Greater Midwestern Conference (1983-1986)
- Heartland Conference (Illinois) (1978-1982)
- Heart of Illinois Conference (1970s) (1972–1978)
- Illini Central Conference (1985-1998)
- Illini 8 Conference (1966-1981)
- Illini Valley Conference (North Central) (1970-1972)
- Illini Valley Conference (South Central) (1928-1973)
- Illio Conference (1952-1975)
- Illowa Conference (1952-1974)
- Indian Valley Conference (1976-1994)
- Iroquois Conference (1970s-1980s)
- Kane County Conference (????-1917)
- Kankakee Valley Conference (1950-1979)
- La Moine Valley Conference (1952-1967)
- Little 6 Conference (1952–1975)
- Little 7 Conference (1921–1995)
- Little 8 Conference (North Central) (1921–1975)
- Little 8 Conference (Far North) (1920s–1980)
- Little 8 Conference (Northeast) (1919–19??)
- Little 8 Conference (Northwest) (1918–192?)
- Little 8 Conference (Southwest) (????–????)
- Little Egypt Conference (1960s-1970s)
- Little Five Conference (1923-1939)
- Little Four Conference (19??'s-1948)
- Meridian Conference (Central Illinois) (1959-1993)
- Meridian Conference (Northern Illinois) (????-????)
- Metro Catholic Conference (1960-1965)
- Metro Suburban Conference (2006-2024)
- Mid Northern Conference (1972-1995)
- Mid-South Conference (1983-2008)
- Mid-State Conference (1944-1997)
- Mid-State Six Conference (196?-2015)
- Midwest Conference (1948-1970)
- Midwestern Conference (1952-1970)
- Mississippi Valley Conference (1957-1968)
- New Salem Conference
- North Central Illinois Conference (1929-2011)
- North Egypt Conference (1938-2003)
- North Shore Conference (1904-1914)
- North Six Conference (1939-1946)
- Northern Illinois Big 12 Conference (2010-2018)
- Northwest Conference (1963-1974)
- Northwest Illinois Conference (NWIC) (1974-1996)
- Northwest 7 Conference (1972-1973)
- Northwest 8 Conference (1977-1990)
- Northwest Suburban Conference (1925-1997)
- Okaw Valley Conference (1950s-2017)
- Olympic Conference (1976-2010)
- PMSC Conference (1961-1973)
- Prairie State Conference (1985-????)
- Quad Cities Metro Conference (1950-1977)
- River Trails Conference (1990-1995)
- Rock River (Valley) Conference (1924-1948)
- Route 72 Conference (1952-1972)
- Sangamon Valley Conference (1948-2021)
- SHARK Conference (1946-1982)
- SICA — (South Inter-Conference Association, dissolved 2006)
- Southeast Suburban Conference (1962-1972)
- Southern Conference (IHSA) (????-????)
- Southern Illini Conference (1957-1974)
- Southern Illini Conference (1986-1993)
- Southwest Egyptian Conference (????-1993)
- Spoon River Conference (1959-1985)
- Stephenson County Conference (1958-1963) (Renamed "Northwest Illinois Conference")
- Suburban Catholic Conference (1960-1973)
- Suburban Catholic Conference (2009-2015)
- Suburban League (1913–1975)
- Suburban Prairie Conference (1995-2005)
- SWANI Conference (1946-1953)
- Tollway Athletic Conference
- Trailblazer Conference (1982-1984)
- Tri State Conference (1932-1935)
- Two Rivers Conference (19??-1958)
- United Conference (1958-1963)
- Upstate Illini Conference (1974-1976)
- Upstate Illini Conference (1991-2000)
- US Grant Conference (1950-1958)
- Vermilion Valley Conference (1950-1981)
- Wauseca Conference (1928-1989)
- West Prairie Trail Conference
- Western Area Conference (1974-1996)
- Western Athletic Conference (1908-1921)
- Western Sun Conference (2006-2010)
- Western Suburban Athletic Conference (1903-1910)
- Western Suburban Catholic Conference (1974-1988)
- Wilco Conference (1959-1973)
- Wil-Ro-Kee Conference (1954-1959) (Renamed "Kankakee Valley Conference" in 1960)
