= Northwest Suburban Conference (Illinois) =

- Conference: IHSA
- Founded: 1925
- Folded: 1997
- No. of teams: 25
- Region: Chicagoland (Cook, DuPage, Kane, Lake, and McHenry counties)

The Northwest Suburban Conference (NWSC) was a high school athletic conference in the northwestern suburbs of Chicago, primarily centered around western Lake County and northwestern Cook County. All of the schools were members of the Illinois High School Association (IHSA).

The conference housed 25 different schools in its 72-year history, with a high turnover rate of schools joining and leaving the conference. Wauconda was the only consistent member of the NWSC for its entire existence.

== History ==
The conference was formed in the spring of 1925 with seven original members: Antioch, Arlington, Barrington, Libertyville, Palatine, Warren, and Wauconda. By 1937, the conference had grown to 13 members with the additions of Leyden in 1926, Bensenville (renamed Fenton in 1955) in 1927, Ela-Vernon (renamed Lake Zurich in 1965) in 1928, Grant and Lake Forest in 1935, and Niles in 1937. Two years later, membership reduced down to 8 when Arlington, Lake Forest, Leyden, Libertyville, Niles, and Warren left and Northbrook joined, and the conference had a stable lineup for 13 years until 1952. Grayslake joined in 1952 when Barrington left for the North Suburban Conference and Northbrook closed, but one year later Northbrook's new school Glenbrook opened and joined the conference. In 1957, Fenton, Glenbrook, and Palatine left to create the Tri County Conference, while Lake Forest and Warren returned and Round Lake joined.

The conference had a stable lineup for 16 years until 1973, when Lake Forest left for the North Suburban and the NWSC added three new members: Cary-Grove, Stevenson, and Woodstock. With two more additions in 1976, Dundee and Jacobs, the NWSC had 12 members, and the conference was split into North and South divisions for football. The division format lasted only two seasons, however, as membership reduced down to 8 after Cary-Grove, Dundee, Jacobs, and Woodstock all left in 1978 to create the Fox Valley Conference.

Stevenson left in 1982 to join the North Suburban and was replaced with Johnsburg. One year later, Antioch and Warren also left to join the North Suburban (Antioch's departure left Wauconda as the sole charter member remaining in the NWSC), and they were replaced with Marengo and Marian Central, the latter being the only private school to ever be a member of the NWSC. In 1991, Lake Zurich left for the Fox Valley Conference and Marengo left for the Big Northern Conference, leaving the NWSC with only 6 teams for the remainder of its existence.

After Grayslake and Marian Central left in 1997 to join the Fox Valley and Suburban Catholic Conferences, respectively, the NWSC officially folded. The four remaining members, Grant, Johnsburg, Round Lake, and Wauconda, played the 1997 football season as independents, although unofficially they played a conference schedule where they each played each other twice for a total of 6 conference games. Johnsburg had joined the Big Northern for all other sports that year and later joined the BNC for football in 1998, while Grant, Round Lake, and Wauconda played all sports as independents until 2000 when they were all accepted into the North Suburban.

From the end of the NWSC until 2006, five schools (Grant, Johnsburg, Marengo, Round Lake, and Wauconda) continued to play tennis together in the "Spirit of the Northwest Suburban Conference" due to the Big Northern Conference (Johnsburg and Marengo's conference at the time) not having tennis as a conference sport. This conference was not recognized by the IHSA.

== All-Time Membership ==
School	Location	County	Mascot	Colors	Year Joined	Year Left	Total Years	Still open	Current Conference
Antioch Community High School	Antioch	Lake	Sequoits		1925	1983	58	Yes	Northern Lake County Conference
Arlington High School	Arlington Heights	Cook	Cardinals		1925	1939	14	No (Note: Closed in 1984.)	
Barrington High School	Barrington	Lake	Broncos/Fillies		1925	1952	27	Yes	Mid-Suburban League
Cary-Grove High School	Cary	McHenry	Trojans		1973	1978	5	Yes	Fox Valley Conference
Dundee Community High School	Carpentersville	Kane	Cardunals (Note: The nickname "Cardunals" was derived from the names of the four towns whose students went to Dundee: Carpentersville, East and West Dundee, and Algonquin. The school's mascot was a cardinal.)		1976	1978	2	No (Note: Consolidated with Irving Crown High School in 1983 to become Dundee-Crown High School.)	
Fenton High School	Bensenville	DuPage	Bison		1927	1957	30	Yes	Upstate Eight Conference
Glenbrook High School (Note: Renamed Glenbrook North High School in 1962.)	Northbrook	Cook	Spartans		1953	1957	4	Yes	Central Suburban League
Grant Community High School	Fox Lake	Lake	Bulldogs		1935	1997	62	Yes	Northern Lake County Conference
Grayslake Community High School (Note: Renamed Grayslake Central High School in 2004.)	Grayslake	Lake	Rams		1952	1997	45	Yes	Northern Lake County Conference
Jacobs High School	Algonquin	McHenry	Golden Eagles		1976	1978	2	Yes	Fox Valley Conference
Johnsburg High School	Johnsburg	McHenry	Skyhawks		1982	1997	15	Yes	Kishwaukee River Conference
Lake Forest High School	Lake Forest	Lake	Scouts		1935	1939	20	Yes	North Suburban Conference
Lake Forest High School	Lake Forest	Lake	Scouts		1957	1973	20	Yes	North Suburban Conference
Lake Zurich High School	Lake Zurich	Lake	Bears		1928	1991	63	Yes	North Suburban Conference
Leyden High School (Note: Renamed East Leyden High School in 1958; East and West Leyden have a combined athletics program that operates under "Leyden High School".)	Franklin Park	Cook	Eagles		1926	1939	13	Yes	West Suburban Conference
Libertyville High School	Libertyville	Lake	Wildcats		1925	1939	14	Yes	North Suburban Conference
Marengo Community High School	Marengo	McHenry	Indians		1983	1991	8	Yes	Kishwaukee River Conference
Marian Central Catholic High School	Woodstock	McHenry	Hurricanes		1983	1997	14	Yes	Chicagoland Christian Conference
Niles Township High School (Note: Renamed Niles East High School in 1959.)	Niles Center	Cook	Trojans		1937	1939	2	No (Note: Closed in 1980.)	
Northbrook High School	Northbrook	Cook	Vikings		1939	1952	13	No (Note: Closed in 1952 and replaced with Glenbrook High School in 1953.)	
Palatine High School	Palatine	Cook	Pirates		1925	1957	32	Yes	Mid-Suburban League
Round Lake High School	Round Lake	Lake	Panthers		1957	1997	40	Yes	Northern Lake County Conference
Adlai E. Stevenson High School	Lincolnshire	Lake	Patriots		1973	1982	9	Yes	North Suburban Conference
Warren Township High School	Gurnee	Lake	Blue Devils		1925	1939	40	Yes	North Suburban Conference
Warren Township High School	Gurnee	Lake	Blue Devils		1957	1983	40	Yes	North Suburban Conference
Wauconda High School	Wauconda	Lake	Bulldogs		1925	1997	72	Yes	Northern Lake County Conference
Woodstock High School	Woodstock	McHenry	Blue Streaks		1973	1978	5	Yes	Kishwaukee River Conference
