= North Suburban Conference (Illinois) =

High school sports conference

- Conference: IHSA
- Founded: 1948
- Sports fielded: 22 (11 boys; 11 girls)
- No. of teams: 8
- Region: Lake County Illinois

Current locations of North Suburban Conference Schools

The North Suburban Conference (NSC) is an extra-curricular conference of eight high schools located in Lake County, Illinois, in the northern suburbs of Chicago. All of the schools are members of the Illinois High School Association (IHSA).

== History ==
Founded in 1948, seven schools located in the northern suburbs of Chicago banded together to create the North Suburban Conference, not to be confused with the Northwest Suburban Conference which was formed in 1925. The original members included Crystal Lake, Grayslake, Lake Forest, Libertyville, Gurnee Warren, Woodstock and Zion-Benton. In 1952, Grayslake and Barrington would switch conferences with Grayslake heading to the Northwest Suburban and Barrington joining the North Suburban. In 1953, McHenry joined the league and Dundee entered in 1957. In the same year, Lake Forest and Gurnee Warren would leave and join the Northwest Suburban. Similar to the previous mentioned switch, Palatine would join the conference from the Northwest Suburban, also in 1957 but eventually leave for the Tri County Conference in 1964. To replace Palatine, North Chicago left the Tri County to join the North Suburban, also in 1964.

The league would continue for ten years, but in 1973 Woodstock would leave and Lake Forest would come back. In addition to Lake Forest, the conference also welcomed Dundee-Crown and Mundelein that same year, taking the total number of schools to 10. Five schools would leave the conference in the late 1970s, Dundee in 1976, Barrington in 1977 and Crown, Crystal Lake and McHenry all exiting for the newly formed Fox Valley Conference in 1978. Unfortunately the league could only add Maine North, from the O'Hare Suburban Conference, as a replacement school to keep the total at six. The following year, in 1979, as the conference pushed to expand, Fenton, from the O'Hare Suburban, Niles North, from the Central Suburban and West Leyden, from the Des Plaines Valley, all joined the league.

As the 1980s began, the conference totaled 9, however, in 1981, Maine North would close and West Leyden consolidated with East Leyden who was a member of the Des Plaines Valley, taking the total back down to 7 schools. Stevenson joined in 1982 and Antioch in 1983. Gurnee Warren made their return in 1983 as well. For the remainder of the 1980s the conference stayed status quo at 10 schools. After the 1991 school year, Niles North would leave and Fenton would do the same in 1995.

Four schools would be added for the 2000 school year and the league would be broken into 2 divisions. The existing schools; Antioch, Lake Forest, Libertyville, Mundelein, Stevenson and Warren formed the Lake Division and new comers; Grant, Round Lake, Vernon Hills, and Wauconda would join existing members North Chicago and Zion-Benton in the Prairie Division. The primary criteria for the separate divisions is school size, with the schools in the Lake Division being larger than the schools in the Prairie Division. In 2005, Lake Zurich joined the Lake Division and Lakes High School would be placed in the Prairie Division. Additionally, Antioch and Zion-Benton would switch divisions.

== Changes ==
Beginning with the 2016-17 athletic season, the NSC reduced its size as the members of the Prairie Division elected to leave the conference to form the Northern Lake County Conference. This conference consists of Antioch, Lakes, Grayslake Central, Grayslake North, Waucounda, Round Lake, Grant, and North Chicago. Vernon Hills also left the conference to join the Central Suburban League. The new NSC also welcomed Waukegan during the 2016–17 season.

== Schools ==
School	Town	Team Name	Colors	IHSA Classes	Reference
Lake Forest High School	Lake Forest	Scouts		AA/3A/4A/5A	
Lake Zurich High School	Lake Zurich	Bears		AA/3A/4A/6A	
Libertyville High School	Libertyville	Wildcats		AA/3A/4A/6A	
Mundelein High School	Mundelein	Mustangs		AA/3A/4A/7A	
Adlai E. Stevenson High School	Lincolnshire	Patriots		AA/3A/4A/8A	
Warren Township High School	Gurnee	Blue Devils		AA/3A/4A/8A	
Waukegan High School	Waukegan	Bulldogs		AA/3A/4A/8A	
Zion-Benton Township High School	Zion	Zee-Bees		AA/3A/4A/7A	

== Rivalries ==
=== Lake Forest Scouts-Libertyville Wildcats rivalry ===
One of the oldest within the conference, there has been a recorded instance of it for several decades.

One of the most well-known traditions associated with the rivalry was a plaque featuring a pipe, which was awarded annually to the winner of the football game. The tradition, which originated from a teacher who had worked at both schools, was discontinued on October 19, 2007, after Lake Forest won following years of losses, in a. 23–20 game. Lake Forest Scouts fans will often refer to Libertyville High School as the "Town Out West", an allusion to Ohio State Buckeyes coach Woody Hayes' nickname of the Michigan Wolverines.

The rivalry has had some incidents over the years, one of which was on October 6, 2021, when a senior from Lake Forest High School ran across the Libertyville football field and struck one of its players. Additionally, there was a fight on the same day that involved 40 individuals during a hockey game, which lead to Community High School District 128 to officially sever ties with the IceCats, Libertyville High School's hockey team.

== Membership timeline ==
NSC Full members Fox Valley Conference Northwest Suburban Conference Northern Lake County Conference) Central Suburban Conference) Additional Conference) Additional Conferences)

== Sports ==
The NSC sponsors competition for teams of young men and women in: basketball, cross country, golf, gymnastics, soccer, swimming & diving, tennis, volleyball, and track & field. There is also sponsorship for young men to compete in baseball, football, and wrestling, while there is sponsorship for young women in dance, cheer, badminton, bowling, and softball.
