= Little 7 Conference =

The Little 7 Conference was a high school athletic conference in Illinois. It was officially organized in October 1921 for 1921–1922 school year.

The first officially sanctioned sport was basketball, with the first game in December 1921 between Batavia and Sycamore (at Batavia). The first track meet was at St. Charles (spring 1922), won by Wheaton, led by Harold E. "Red" Grange in his senior year. The first officially sanctioned football season was fall 1922.

== Little 7 Conference (1921–1995) ==
=== The beginning ===
The seven founding members of the Little 7 Conference were:

High School	LSC Duration	Next Conference	Current Conference
Batavia High School	1921–1995	Suburban Prairie Conference	DuKane Conference
Dundee High School	1921–1957	North Suburban Conference	Fox Valley Conference
Geneva Community High School	1921–1995	Suburban Prairie Conference	DuKane Conference
Naperville High School	1921–1963	Upstate Eight Conference	DuPage Valley Conference
St. Charles High School	1921–1963	Upstate Eight Conference	DuKane Conference
Sycamore High School	1921–1995	Suburban Prairie Conference	Interstate Eight Conference
Wheaton High School	1921–1959	N/A	DuKane Conference

With the exception of Sycamore, the other six charter members were previously partners in the Bi-County League (Kane and DuPage Counties), 1917–1919. However, the schools did not like the set-up for the league and went their separate ways.

Two years later, the group of six would try again.

Naperville and Wheaton left the DuPage County League to join former Kane County Conference members Batavia, Dundee, Geneva and St. Charles to form a new league. Sycamore entered the conference, but it's unknown what league the Spartans left behind, if any.

Wheaton changed its name to Wheaton Community High School in 1925 and dropped out of the league in 1930. The Tiger program returned a few years later, but the return date is not officially known.

Batavia dropped its football program in 1934, but after three years, the Bulldogs (which were then called the Vikings) returned to the gridiron.

After 13 school years in the West Suburban Conference, West Chicago High School departed to join the Little 7 in 1936. “WeGo” previously held conference rivalries before as part of the Bi-County League during World War I. The addition to league was the first in the conference's history and it created an 8-team conference, yet at times in the 1940s, the Wildcats dropped their football program.

Throughout the life of the conference, the league fluctuated between seven and eight teams, but the name was never changed due to the fact when there were eight teams in the league, schools always had seven opponents.

=== Urban sprawl and change ===
Nearly, two decades of stability kept the Little 7 Conference motoring along. However that began to change in the mid 1950s. Suburban sprawl begin to push west from Chicago and with expressways making travel easier to downtown Chicago, more residents were beginning to move into LSC territory. The next two decades would see 13 different schools either join or leave the conference.

Wheaton ended conference play in football and basketball in 1955. Match-ups continued but were considered non-conference affairs.

On October 9, 1956, Dundee High School submitted a request to leave the conference. The school would become the first charter member to leave the conference after the 1956-57 school year. Dundee became a charter member of the newly formed North Suburban Conference.

The conference filled the opening a year later with the admission of Mooseheart High School in 1958. The league returned to eight teams. But after much speculation, Wheaton officially departed the league in all sports in 1959.

Belvidere High School jumped at the chance to get in the Little 7 in 1959. Applying for membership at least five years earlier, The Bucs were welcomed for a brief stint in the LSC.

With enrollment growing, Naperville sought a conference with similar numbers. In the spring of 1963, the Redskin program departed for the brand new Upstate Eight Conference. Belvidere would also leave the conference with Naperville.

In the fall of that year, two new additions to the Little 7 were Kaneland and Oswego. Kaneland High School, based in Maple Park, joined up from the smaller [Little 8 Conference] after just five school years and Oswego High School left the Fox Valley Conference to join the Little 7.

St. Charles was beginning to feel the added enrollment and was forced to find a conference that kept the Saints on a similar playing field. In the fall of 1965, St. Charles left their rivals to the south, Batavia and Geneva, behind and joined the Upstate Eight Conference after 44 seasons in the Little 7.

That fall, Plainfield High School filled the void left by St. Charles by joining the Little 7 from the Fox Valley Conference. Mooseheart departed after nine school years in the conference for the now-defunct Little 10 Conference.

In the fall of 1967, Cary-Grove High School joined the Little 7 from the Tri-County Conference and participated for six school years before departing for the Northwest Suburban Conference.

With Morris Community High School joining the Little 7 Conference in the fall of 1973, intense football rivalries jumped a notch thanks to the historic Redskin program. It also, forced the dissolution of the Illinois Valley Conference.

In 1975, West Chicago bolted after 39 years for the newly formed DuPage Valley Conference. The Wildcats won their only football state championship in their final season in the Little 7, but has struggled to keep up with the powerful DVC, only finishing above .500 once since 1982. Since 2000, “WeGo” officials have formally explored their way out of the league twice. The school finally made the move out of the DVC for the Upstate Eight Conference in 2013. The Wildcats now compete in the same division with old rivals Batavia, Geneva, and St. Charles East (formerly St. Charles).

In the fall, the league added Waubonsie Valley High School. Waubonsie was a newly built school in Aurora and it kept the league at eight teams. With the addition of the Warriors, the Little 7 would not have any movement for 16 years.

Waubonsie Valley began to dominate in most sports thanks to a massive surge in enrollment. It forced the Warrior program to leave the Little 7 for the Upstate Eight Conference in 1991. The school district would eventually split twice and now has 3 high schools in Aurora–Naperville-based district.

In the fall of that year, two teams were added to help fill the void left behind by the Warriors. Minooka High School bolted the now-defunct Northeast Conference to help deal with a local population surge and to pair up with natural rivalries with Morris, Oswego and Plainfield. Yorkville High School, feeling its own enrollment growth, joined the LSC from the Interstate Eight Conference.

=== End of an era ===
The final alignment of the league is shown below with only Batavia, Geneva, and Sycamore as members for the entire history of the conference.

1994–95 - Final Alignment	Joined	Next Conference	Current Conference
Batavia High School	1921	Suburban Prairie Conference	DuKane Conference
Geneva Community High School	1921	Suburban Prairie Conference	DuKane Conference
Kaneland High School	1963	Suburban Prairie Conference	Interstate Eight Conference
Minooka High School	1991	Suburban Prairie Conference	Southwest Prairie Conference
Morris Community High School	1973	Suburban Prairie Conference	Interstate Eight Conference
Oswego High School	1963	Suburban Prairie Conference	Southwest Prairie Conference
Plainfield High School	1965	Suburban Prairie Conference	Southwest Prairie Conference
Sycamore High School	1921	Suburban Prairie Conference	Interstate Eight Conference
Yorkville High School	1991	Suburban Prairie Conference	Southwest Prairie Conference

As the schools searched for ways to stay together and hold onto long-time rivalries, it was evident to all parties that the enrollment disparity between the nine schools would be problematic. The solution was to expand and split divisions, ending the tradition of the Little 7 Conference.

In 1995, the members of the Southwest Suburban Conference – Elmwood Park, Evergreen Park, Lemont, Ridgewood, Riverside-Brookfield and Westmont – and Fenton joined up with the Little 7 Conference to form the eventual 17-team super league, the Suburban Prairie Conference (Glenbard South would leave the DVC for the SPC in 1996).

The conference ultimately failed. In May 1995, Kaneland junior Josh Faber expressed some doubts to the Chicago Tribune.

"I don't know what to expect. Some of the teams I've never even heard of. I wished we kept the Little Seven or (go)…where other small schools like Burlington Central are. The distance is going to be a pain. I'm not looking forward to hour bus rides."

With divisions based on enrollment and not geography, the camaraderie that the Little 7 enjoyed struggled to take hold in the new SPC. Travel from Sycamore to Riverside-Brookfield was an example of why the league didn't work. A trip from one end to the other of the conference for a weekday afternoon contest was difficult. As the league struggled to return to a geographic based set up, conference officials found an old problem.

The years following the disbandment of the Little 7, Plainfield would split into four different high schools. Oswego would split and add Oswego East. Minooka's enrollment soared, while Morris's shrank. Geneva and Batavia would experience growth, but Yorkville and Kaneland did not get the expected bump in enrollment. In 2005, the SPC would split into 3 different leagues.

== Little 7 rivalries ==
Many of the conference rivalries developed on the football gridiron during the 74 years of the league.

One of the oldest rivalries in the state of Illinois is between Batavia and Geneva. The two neighboring schools separated by five miles played each other 68 times in Little 7 play. Geneva won the LSC stretch of the rivalry going 43–23–5 against the Bulldogs, including a 19-game winning streak that stretched from 1967–1986. Following the departure of legendary Viking coach Jerry Auchstetter, the Bulldogs snapped the streak with a 13-6 victory in 1986.

Their rivalry continues in the DuKane Conference.

There were many fierce battles in the late 1970s and early 1980s battles between Morris and Geneva. The two programs battled for the league's coveted playoff berth year in and year out prior to the IHSA admitting at-large entrants. Morris, under the direction of Dan Darlington, made five title game appearances while in the LSC, winning titles in 1980 and 1984 while Geneva was eliminated in the semifinal round on three occasions and fell in one title contest in 1975.

Morris collected 12 LSC titles and made it to the state title game in the league's final season. Geneva made the playoffs in 1992 falling in the 2nd round to conference-rival Oswego while the Panthers were on their way to the school's first state championship.

The two briefly resurrected the rivalry in 2005–06, with the Redskins dominating two games (including a playoff game) en route to a 2005 Class 6A state championship. The Vikings shutout Morris for the first time in 30 years to open the 2006 season en route to the Class 6A Semifinals, but fellat home to Batavia in the only playoff meeting between the schools. Geneva and Morris have not played since.

Around that time in the late 1980s with Geneva's program slipping to the middle of the pack, Oswego emerged as the Redskins chief rival. Morris and Oswego tuned up for the playoffs in the final years of the conference with low scoring battles in the final week of the season, typically with the LSC title on the line. In the league's final season, the two shared the conference crown.

Their rivalry continued until 2008, when Morris bolted the Southwest Prairie Conference for the smaller North Central Illinois Conference (NCIC). However, the two schools held a season opening match-up in 2010. Long-time Oswego head coach Karl Hoinkes, now at Yorkville, helped the Foxes to their first win at Morris in 50 years in 2012.

Other rivalries included, Sycamore and Kaneland, Naperville and Wheaton, and briefly Minooka and Morris. St. Charles enjoyed conference rivalries with both Batavia and Geneva. In fact, St. Charles original building was just blocks from Geneva's original school until the late 1970s. With the Saints departure to the Upstate Eight in 1965, those rivalries subsided a bit while Geneva and Batavia flourished.

The rivalries returned when Batavia and Geneva joined the now named St. Charles East (split with St. Charles North in 2001) in the Upstate Eight in 2010.

== Little 7 boys basketball ==
Rivalries have extended to other sports as well. Waubonsie Valley and Batavia battled for the basketball title in the late 1980s and early 1990s. Both were led by the greatest players its school has ever seen. Lance Broderson left as Waubonsie's all-time leading scorer and the high flying Warriors posted 94 points on Batavia in a meeting in 1989. It remains the school record for most in a single game. Meanwhile, the Bulldogs were led by Corey Williams, who eventually led the University of Arizona to a Final Four in 1994.

Williams on the rivalry during his jersey-retirement ceremony in February 2010: "The games I remember getting butterflies were the Waubonsie games. By sixth or seventh period at school you are ready to play. Cars parked all around the block. I remember those days."

The rivalry peaked in 1991 with both Batavia (27–2) and Waubonsie Valley (26–3) netted sectional titles. The Bulldogs used a roster with multiple Division-I prospects to reach the state quarterfinals, falling to Marshall from Chicago, a team featured in the documentary Hoop Dreams with star guard Arthur Agee. For Waubonsie, it remains the school's only sectional championship.

Dundee enjoyed a plethora of success in the late 1930s and early 1940s. The run peaked with a 34–1 season and a state championship in 1938 after a school-record 39-win season the previous year. After the title, Dundee returned downstate in 1940, 1946, and 1947. Eugene de Lacey compiled a record of 691–172 in 31 seasons at Dundee. The [IHSA] only acknowledges 675 wins, good enough for 16th all-time in Illinois history.

Don Blanken was the star of that Dundee title squad. Blanken continued on to Purdue and eventually the Dayton Metropolitans of the now-defunct NBL. He died in October 2009 at the age of 89.

There were plenty of trips to Champaign during the 74-year league. Wheaton made it downstate in 1929, Geneva went in 1963 and Oswego in 1974. Kaneland came up short in the title game in 1973, returning to Assembly Hall in 1982.

== Extra facts ==
- Red Grange was still in high school at Wheaton when the Little 7 Conference was being organized.
- Kaneland never won a football conference championship or qualified for the playoffs in LSC play. However, the Knights won the Little 8 crown the season prior to moving to the Little 7. After disbandment, the Knights won back-to-back state championships in 1997–98, led by All-State WR P. J. Fleck. He set numerous IHSA state records, went on to star at Northern Illinois Huskies, spent a short time with the San Francisco 49ers before now settling in as the head coach for the Minnesota Golden Gophers.
- Sycamore won 33 straight football games in the 1960s

Conference sports mentioned in the records examined included football, basketball, track, and baseball, and (beginning perhaps in 1958–59) wrestling and golf. The introduction of wrestling as a conference sport was discussed as early as March 1956, but no action was taken at that time. In addition, schools may have participated in other sports that were not official conference sports. For example, some participated in wrestling much earlier than 1958.

== Notable athletes ==
- Ken Anderson – Batavia (1962–66), Cincinnati Bengals – All-NFL QB
- Don Beebe – Kaneland (1979–83), Six-time Super Bowl Participant
- Scott Dierking – West Chicago (1970–74), New York Jets RB
- Kelly Dransfeldt – Morris (1989–93), Chicago White Sox – Infielder
- Mike Fisher – Batavia (1989–93), Virginia Cavaliers – All-American, two-time National Soccer Player of the Year
- Red Grange – Wheaton (1918–22), Illinois Fighting Illini – All-American Football Player, Chicago Bears – Pro Football Hall of Fame Player
- Dan Issel – Batavia (1962–66), Kentucky Colonels (ABA), Denver Nuggets (ABA/NBA) – Basketball Hall of Fame Player/Coach
- John Ivlow – Plainfield (1984–88), Chicago Bears, Denver Broncos, San Francisco 49ers (NFL), Bolingbrook High School Head Coach 8A Champions
- Gail Olson – Sycamore (1975–79), National Indoor High Jump Record Holder for 26 years (7'5" – 1978)
- Craig Sager – Batavia (1963–67), Northwestern Wildcats – Walk-On, TNT Sideline Reporter
- Todd Schulz – Morris (1990–94), Michigan State – Quarterback
- Ed Brady - Morris (1976–80), University of Illinois, LA Rams, Cincinnati Bengals (Super Bowl XXIII 1989), Tampa Bay Buccaneers
- Scott Spiezio – Morris (1987–91), 12-year MLB Player, member of Anaheim Angels – 2002 World Series Champions
- Hack Tison – Geneva (1957–61), Duke University – All-ACC Basketball Player and 1964 National Runner-Up
- Corey Williams – Batavia (1988–92), Arizona Wildcats – 1994 Final Four, 12-year International Pro-Basketball Player
- Rick Wohlhuter (born December 23, 1948, St. Charles, Illinois), graduated from Saint Charles High School in 1966 and is one of the final track and field record holders.
- Joey Goodspeed - Oswego (1993-1996), All-State RB and LB, Notre Dame LB and FB, NFL FB for the Saint Louis Rams, New Orleans Saints, and Minnesota Vikings
