= Fox Valley Conference =

High school extracurricular conference in Illinois, U.S.

- League: IHSA
- Founded: 1978
- No. of teams: 10
- Region: Northern Illinois (McHenry and Kane counties)

Locations of Fox Valley Schools

The Fox Valley Conference is an IHSA recognized high school extracurricular conference including the following schools, generally located in the northern part of the Fox River basin in Illinois, United States. The conference regularly produces strong athletic teams, including 6A Football State Champions Prairie Ridge (2016–17) and Cary-Grove (2018, 2021, 2023); 2017 4A State Baseball Champion Crystal Lake South; and 2019 4A State Softball Champion Huntley.

== Schools ==
The conference consists of 10 teams total. All enrollments and classifications are from the Illinois High School Association website. The schools who are part of the conference are Burlington Central, Hampshire High School, Huntley High School, Dundee Crown High School, Jacobs High School, Mchenry County High School, Crystal Lake South, Crystal Lake Central, Cary Grove, and Prairie Ridge High School

School	Town	Team Name	Colors	Year Joined	Enrollment	IHSA Classes 2/3/4 (Note: The state series class which a school competes in not only depends on the school's student population, but on the sport or activity. Some activities divide schools into two classes, some into three, and others into four. The listing here is in the order of two class, three class, and four class. The more "A"s in a class, the larger the schools competing. For more information on this, see Illinois High School Association#State Series Format.) (Note: Schools are not assigned a classification for football until they have qualified for the playoffs each year. A school's classification not only depends on their student population, but on the populations of the other schools who have qualified. Thus, some schools routinely move between classes.)
Cary-Grove High School	Cary	Trojans		1978	1326	AA / 2A / 3A
Central High School	Burlington	Rockets		2019	1585	AA / 3A / 3A
Crystal Lake Central High School	Crystal Lake	Tigers		1978	1404	AA / 2A / 3A
Crystal Lake South High School	Crystal Lake	Gators		1978	1255	AA / 2A / 3A
Dundee-Crown High School	Carpentersville	Chargers		1983	2569	AA / 3A / 4A
Hampshire High School	Hampshire	Whip-Purs		2011	2054	AA / 3A / 4A
Huntley High School	Huntley	Red Raiders		2003	2695	AA / 3A / 4A
Jacobs High School	Algonquin	Golden Eagles		1978	2059	AA / 3A / 4A
McHenry High School	McHenry	Warriors		1978	2185	AA / 3A / 4A
Prairie Ridge High School	Crystal Lake	Wolves		1997	1101	AA / 2A / 3A

=== Previous Members ===
School	Town	Team Name	Colors	Year Joined	Year Left	Total Years	Current Conference
Dundee Community High School	Carpentersville	Cardunals (Note: The nickname "Cardunals" was derived from the names of the four towns whose students went to Dundee: Carpentersville, East and West Dundee, and Algonquin. The school's mascot was a cardinal.)		1978	1983	5	Consolidated to become Dundee-Crown High School
Irving Crown High School	Carpentersville	Vikings		1978	1983	5	Consolidated to become Dundee-Crown High School
Woodstock High School	Woodstock	Blue Streaks		1978	2016	38	Kishwaukee River Conference
Lake Zurich High School	Lake Zurich	Bears		1991	2005	14	North Suburban Conference
Grayslake Central High School	Grayslake	Rams		1997	2016	19	Northern Lake County Conference
Grayslake North High School	Grayslake	Knights		2006	2016	10	Northern Lake County Conference
Johnsburg High School	Johnsburg	Skyhawks		2006	2014	8	Kishwaukee River Conference
Woodstock North High School	Woodstock	Thunder		2009	2016	7	Kishwaukee River Conference

== Changes ==
- Dundee Community High School and Irving Crown High School, both charter members of the FVC, consolidated to become Dundee-Crown at the start of the 1983–84 school year.
- Lake Zurich joined the conference in 1991–92.
- Grayslake (now known as Grayslake Central) joined in 1997–98. Prairie Ridge opened this year and joined the conference as well.
- Huntley joined in 2003–04. (This led to a scheduling issue for the football season. With 11 schools in the conference, it was impossible to have each school play all 10 other conference opponents because the football regular season is only 9 games.)
- Lake Zurich left to join the North Suburban Conference after the 2004–05 school year.
- Johnsburg and Grayslake North joined in 2006–07. The 12 schools were split into two divisions: the smaller schools (Crystal Lake Central, Grayslake Central, Grayslake North, Huntley, Johnsburg, Prairie Ridge) in the Fox Division, and the larger schools (Cary-Grove, Crystal Lake South, Dundee-Crown, Jacobs, McHenry, Woodstock) in the Valley Division.
- Woodstock North joined in 2009–10, being placed in the Fox Division. With Woodstock's enrollment split in half due to Woodstock North opening, it moved down to the Fox Division, and Huntley moved up to the Valley Division.
- Hampshire joined in 2011–12. They joined the Fox Division, and Prairie Ridge moved into the Valley Division.
- Johnsburg left to join the Big Northern Conference in 2014–15. Prairie Ridge moved back into the Fox Division.
- Woodstock and Woodstock North left in 2016–17 to become charter members of the Kishwaukee River Conference. Grayslake North and Grayslake Central also left this same year to become charter members of the Northern Lake County Conference. With only 9 remaining schools, the FVC eliminated its division format.
- Central joined in 2019–20.

== State championships ==
There have been 27 total IHSA State Championships earned by members of the FVC.

=== Football ===
- Woodstock
  - 1983–84 4A
  - 1997–98 5A
- Cary-Grove
  - 2009–10 6A
  - 2018–19 6A
  - 2021–22 6A
  - 2023–24 6A
- Prairie Ridge
  - 2011–12 6A
  - 2016–17 6A
  - 2017–18 6A
  - 2023-24 6A
  - 2024-25 6A

=== Volleyball (girls) ===
- Crystal Lake Central
  - 2007–08 3A
- Cary-Grove
  - 2009–10 4A

=== Cross country (boys) ===
- Crystal Lake Central
  - 1995–96 AA
- Grayslake Central
  - 2015–16 2A

=== Golf (boys) ===
- Crystal Lake South
  - 1980–81 AA

=== Soccer (boys) ===
- Prairie Ridge
  - 1999–00 A
- Crystal Lake South
  - 2018–19 2A
  - 2023 2A

=== Soccer (girls) ===
- Crystal Lake Central
  - 2023-24 2A
- Crystal Lake Central
  - 2025-26 2A

=== Competitive cheerleading ===
- Hampshire
  - 2014–15 M
- Crystal Lake Central
  - 2021–22 M

=== Competitive dance ===
- Crystal Lake Central
  - 2012–13 2A

=== Gymnastics (girls) ===
- Prairie Ridge
  - 2014–15
  - 2015–16
  - 2016–17
  - 2019–20
  - 2021–22

=== Baseball ===
- Prairie Ridge
  - 2007–08 4A
- Crystal Lake South
  - 2016–17 4A
- Crystal Lake Central
  - 2023-24 3A

=== Softball ===
- Huntley
  - 2018–19 4A

=== Journalism ===
- Huntley
  - 2021–22
  - 2023–24
