= Community Consolidated School District 46 =

School district in Illinois, United States

Address
- 565 Frederick Road Grayslake, Illinois, 60030; United States

District information
- Motto: Strive for excellence
- Grades: K-8
- Superintendent: Dr. Lynn Glickman

Other information
- Website: Official website

Community Consolidated School District 46 is a PK-8 school district located in the northern reaches of Lake County, Illinois; almost half of its schools are based in the village of Grayslake. The consolidated district is composed of seven schools: those seven schools can further be divided into two branches. The first branch is progressive, with students moving from school to school, and that list of progression is listed here; Meadowview School serves kindergarten through fourth grade. The principal of the school is Laura Morgan, and the school is located in Grayslake. There are three other elementary schools in the district, and they are named Avon Center School, Prairieview School, and Woodview School; these schools are all facilities in which those in kindergarten through fourth grade. Respectively, Avon Center is located in Round Lake Beach, Prairieview is located in Hainesville, and Woodview is located in Grayslake; Lynn Barkley is the principal of Avon Center, Dr. Amanda Schoenberg is the principal of Prairieview, and Jeff Knapp is principal at Woodview. All elementary schools feed into Frederick Intermediate School, which serves the early junior high grades five and six and is directed by principal Eric Detweiler; All graduates of Frederick Intermediate, in turn, attend Grayslake Middle School, which educates the seventh and eighth grade under the direction of principal Marcus Smith. The second branch is composed of one grade school, or a school that serves all grades within the same facility. This facility is called Park Campus and it is governed by principal Matt Melamed. Park Campus and Grayslake Middle School feed into Grayslake Community High School District 127, and into one of its two high schools: Grayslake North High School, or Grayslake Central High School.

The mascot of Avon Center School is the "Koalaty Kid," while the mascot at Prairieview is eagle and the mascot at Woodview is the owl. Frederick Intermediate School has the falcon as its mascot, and Grayslake Middle School is cheered on as the panthers. The wolf is the mascot of Park School Campus.
