= Mike Heimerdinger =

American football player and coach (1952–2011)

Personal information
- Born: October 13, 1952; DeKalb, Illinois, U.S.
- Died: September 30, 2011 (aged 58); Mexico

Career information
- College: Eastern Illinois

Career history
- Grant HS (IL) (1975–1977) Assistant coach; Johnsburg HS (IL) (1978–1979) Head coach; Florida (1980) Graduate assistant; Air Force (1981) Wide receivers coach; North Texas State (1982) Quarterbacks coach; Florida (1983–1987) Wide receivers coach; Cal State Fullerton (1988) Offensive coordinator; Rice (1989–1993) Offensive coordinator; Duke (1994) Offensive coordinator; Denver Broncos (1995–1999) Wide receivers coach; Tennessee Titans (2000–2004) Offensive coordinator; New York Jets (2005) Offensive coordinator; Denver Broncos (2006) Assistant head coach; Denver Broncos (2007) Assistant head coach / quarterbacks coach; Tennessee Titans (2008–2010) Offensive coordinator

Awards and highlights
- 2× Super Bowl champion (XXXII, XXXIII); George Halas Award (2011)
- Coaching profile at Pro Football Reference

Michael Heimerdinger (October 13, 1952 – September 30, 2011) was an American football coach who held various coordinator and position coach roles during 18 seasons in the National Football League (NFL). He began his career by coaching high school football in Illinois, and then held positions with six different college football teams. Heimerdinger died at the age of 58 in 2011, after suffering from cancer.

== Career ==
Heimerdinger was most recently the offensive coordinator for the Tennessee Titans, a position he had served in from 2000 to 2004 and again from 2008 to 2010. Prior to serving in this position, Heimerdinger was an assistant head coach for the Denver Broncos succeeding Gary Kubiak who took the head coaching position with the Houston Texans.

He played wide receiver at Eastern Illinois University from 1970 to 1974 and was roommates with Mike Shanahan. He was then the wide receivers coach at the University of Florida, when they won two consecutive SEC titles in 1984 and 1985, and after that, was receivers coach for Shanahan with the Denver Broncos, from 1995 until 1999. He was also offensive coordinator for the New York Jets for the 2005 season. Prior to that, he held positions in college football as Duke University's offensive coordinator, Rice University's offensive coordinator, Cal State Fullerton's offensive coordinator, the University of Florida wide receivers' coach, North Texas State's quarterbacks coach, and the U.S. Air Force Academy' wide receivers' coach.

With the Titans, Heimerdinger coached players such as Steve McNair, Eddie George, Derrick Mason, and Hall of Fame lineman Bruce Matthews. He helped Head Coach Jeff Fisher lead the Titans to the playoffs in 2000, 2002, and 2003.

He was hired by the Jets in 2005, as offensive coordinator, in what would be a disastrous season for the franchise. After the Jets' Head Coach Herman Edwards was released from his contract, Heimerdinger was interviewed and passed over for the head coaching position. Although it was obvious he would have preferred to void his contract with the Jets, he was initially informed by new coach Eric Mangini that he would be retained as offensive coordinator as per his original contract. He was later released from his contract by the Jets as part of an undisclosed agreement. He then took a position as the Denver Broncos' assistant head coach under Mike Shanahan, where he worked with quarterback Jay Cutler, transforming him into the Broncos' starting quarterback.

He returned to the Tennessee Titans as their new offensive coordinator, after the Titans fired Norm Chow. He was hired to help develop quarterback Vince Young, who was drafted ahead of Cutler in the 2006 NFL draft. Under Heimerdinger, veteran quarterback Kerry Collins, and a dominating defense led by defensive coordinator Jim Schwartz and defensive tackle Albert Haynesworth, the Titans had a 13–3 record (best in the league) and won the AFC South title.

On November 24, 2010, he began to undergo chemotherapy for treating cancer that had been recently diagnosed. His role as offensive coordinator was expected to be assumed by Titans quarterbacks coach Dowell Loggains and offensive line coach Mike Munchak during his absence however, Heimerdinger continued coaching every game throughout the remainder of the season.

On February 8, 2011, Heimerdinger was fired by newly hired head coach Munchak.

== Personal life ==
Heimerdinger had two children with his wife, Kathie. His children are Brian and Alicia. Heimerdinger died of cancer on September 30, 2011, in Mexico.
