= Big Northern Conference =

Organization of schools in Illinois

- Conference: IHSA
- Founded: 1991 (football), 1995 (all sports)
- No. of teams: 10
- Region: Northern Illinois (Boone, DeKalb, Lee, Ogle, Whiteside, and Winnebago counties)

Locations of Big Northern Schools

The Big Northern Conference (BNC) is an organization of ten high schools in northern Illinois. These high schools are members of the Illinois High School Association.

The high schools of the Big Northern Conference are located in the following counties: Boone, DeKalb, LaSalle, Lee, Ogle, Whiteside, and Winnebago.

== History ==
The conference was formed in 1991 as a football-only union of the Big Eight Conference and the Mid-Northern Conference. The original 12 members consisted of six Big Eight schools (Burlington Central, Genoa-Kingston, Hampshire, Harvard, Marengo, and Richmond-Burton), five Mid-Northern schools (Byron, Forreston, Oregon, Stillman Valley, and Winnebago), and one independent school (Ottawa Marquette). Of the remaining football teams from each conference, Pecatonica played in a co-op with Winnebago, Polo and Mt. Morris joined the Upstate Illini Conference, and Huntley played an independent schedule. Pecatonica, Polo, and Mt. Morris all continued to play in the Mid-Northern in other sports, and Huntley continued to do the same in the Big Eight.

In 1995, the Big Eight and Mid Northern merged for all sports, with Ottawa Marquette remaining the only football-only member. Forreston left the conference, moving to the Upstate Illini for all sports. Of the schools from either conference who didn't participate in the football-only merger, Huntley was the only one to join the full merger in 1995, replacing Forreston in football. Pecatonica (who ended their co-op with Winnebago in football) and Polo joined the Upstate Illini in 1995, while Mt. Morris closed in 1994 and merged with Oregon.

Few more changes occurred over the next 15 years. Johnsburg replaced Ottawa Marquette for football in 1998 after joining the BNC for all other sports in 1997, Huntley left in 2003 to join the Fox Valley Conference and was replaced by Rockford Lutheran, and Johnsburg left in 2006 to join the Fox Valley and was replaced by North Boone.

The conference has had several changes since 2011 and peaked at 16 schools during the 2014–15 and 2015–16 school years. Hampshire left for the Fox Valley Conference in 2011 and was replaced by Rock Falls. Mendota joined for all sports except for football in 2011, but began playing football in the BNC in 2012 along with Rockford Christian who joined that year as a full member. In 2014, Johnsburg rejoined the conference and Dixon became a new member.

Following the 2015–16 school year, Burlington Central, Harvard, Johnsburg, Marengo, and Richmond-Burton left the BNC to join Woodstock and Woodstock North in creating the Kishwaukee River Conference. With 11 schools in the 2016–17 school year, the BNC played as one division for the first time in conference history. In football, BNC schools played against only 8 conference opponents, with the 7 largest schools also playing one game against a team in the KRC.

From 1991–92 to 2005–06, the conference's two divisions for football were determined by school size, with the 6 larger schools in the BNC Red Division and the 6 smaller schools in the BNC White Division (with the exception of Ottawa Marquette, which was in the Red Division from 1991–92 to 1997–98 despite having the smallest enrollment in the BNC). Other sports also used the Red and White divisions from 1995–96 to 2000–01, but switched to East and West divisions in 2001–02 (football used East and West divisions in 2002–03 before switching back to Red and White divisions the next year). In 2006–07, the BNC permanently switched to East and West divisions for all sports until it ceased having two divisions in 2016–17.

In 2018, Rockford Christian moved to the Northeastern Athletic Conference in football while remaining in the BNC for all other sports. Having 10 teams in football made it possible for the BNC to have a full conference schedule, as there are 9 games in the regular season. Rockford Christian returned to the BNC for football in 2021. Five games into the 2024–25 football season, Rockford Christian cancelled its football season due to low numbers. They planned to switch to eight-man football in 2025, but cancelled their season. The Durand-Pecatonica Coop out of the Northwest Upstate Illini Conference will join the Big Northern Conference in the 2026-2027 school year putting the number of teams back at 10.

Mendota left the conference after the 2020–2021 school year to join the Three Rivers Conference.

== Membership ==
The conference's current members, as of 2025–26:

School	Town	Team Name	Colors	Year Joined	Enrollment	IHSA Classes 2/3/4 (Note: The state series class which a school competes in not only depends on the school's student population, but on the sport or activity. Some activities divide schools into two classes, some into three, and others into four. The listing here is in the order of two class, three class, and four class. The more "A"s in a class, the larger the schools competing. For more information on this, see Illinois High School Association#State Series Format.) (Note: Schools are not assigned a classification for football until they have qualified for the playoffs each year. A school's classification not only depends on their student population, but on the populations of the other schools who have qualified. Thus, some schools routinely move between classes.)
Byron High School	Byron	Tigers		1991 (football) 1995 (all sports)	465	A/1A/2A
Dixon High School	Dixon	Dukes/Duchesses		2014	772	A/2A/3A
Genoa-Kingston High School	Genoa	Cogs		1991 (football) 1995 (all sports)	496	A/1A/2A
North Boone High School	Poplar Grove	Vikings		2006	495	A/1A/2A
Oregon High School	Oregon	Hawks		1991 (football) 1995 (all sports)	444	A/1A/2A
Rock Falls High School	Rock Falls	Rockets		2011	533	A/1A/2A
Rockford Christian High School	Rockford	Royal Lions		2012	200 (Note: When applied with a multiplier, Rockford Christian's enrollment is treated as 330)	A/1A/2A
Rockford Lutheran High School	Rockford	Crusaders		2003	274 (Note: When applied with a multiplier, Rockford Lutheran's enrollment is treated as 452.10)	A/1A/2A
Stillman Valley High School	Stillman Valley	Cardinals		1991 (football) 1995 (all sports)	433	A/1A/2A
Winnebago High School	Winnebago	Indians		1991 (football) 1995 (all sports)	429	A/1A/2A

=== Previous Members ===
School	Town	Team Name	Colors	Year Joined	Year Left	Total Years	Current Conference
Forreston High School	Forreston	Cardinals		1991	1995	4	Northwest Upstate Illini Conference
Burlington Central High School	Burlington	Rockets		1991 (football) 1995 (all sports)	2016	25	Fox Valley Conference
Hampshire High School	Hampshire	Whip-Purs		1991 (football) 1995 (all sports)	2011	20	Fox Valley Conference
Harvard High School	Harvard	Hornets		1991 (football) 1995 (all sports)	2016	25	Kishwaukee River Conference
Marengo Community High School	Marengo	Indians		1991 (football) 1995 (all sports)	2016	25	Kishwaukee River Conference
Marquette High School	Ottawa	Crusaders		1991	1998	7	Chicago Prairie Football League (football) Tri-County Conference (all other sports)
Richmond-Burton Community High School	Richmond	Rockets		1991 (football) 1995 (all sports)	2016	25	Kishwaukee River Conference
Huntley High School	Huntley	Red Raiders		1995	2003	8	Fox Valley Conference
Johnsburg High School	Johnsburg	Skyhawks		1997 (non-football) 1998 (all sports)	2006	11	Kishwaukee River Conference
Johnsburg High School	Johnsburg	Skyhawks		2014	2016	11	Kishwaukee River Conference
Mendota Township High School	Mendota	Trojans		2011 (non-football) 2012 (all sports)	2021	10	Three Rivers Conference

=== Membership timeline ===
From 1991–92 to 1994–95, the Mid-Northern Conference and Big Eight Conference continued to play all non-football sports in their respective pre-merger conferences, with a full merger happening at the start of the 1995–96 school year. Marengo, which was part of the Northwest Suburban Conference during the 1990–91 school year before joining the BNC for football in 1991, joined the Big Eight for all other sports. Ottawa Marquette was independent in all non-football sports during its entire time associated with the BNC. Huntley did not accompany the other Big Eight schools in the BNC football merger, playing football independently for 1991 and 1992 and in the Upstate Illini Conference for 1993 and 1994. Pecatonica from 1990–91 to 1994–95 was in a co-op with Winnebago for football, but they continued to play separately in the Mid-Northern Conference in other sports..

Mid-Northern (1972-95) Big Eight (1980-95) BNC Football Only (1991-95) Big Northern Conference full members BNC members (non-football)

== State championships ==
There have been 39 total IHSA State Championships earned by members of the BNC. Additionally, there were also 8 championships won by members of the Mid-Northern Conference (1972–73 to 1994–95) and 2 championships won by members of the Big Eight Conference (1980–81 to 1994–95) before the two conferences merged.

=== Football ===
- Richmond-Burton
  - 1992–93 2A
- Hampshire
  - 1995–96 2A
- Stillman Valley
  - 1999–00 2A
  - 2000–01 2A
  - 2003–04 3A
  - 2009–10 3A
  - 2013–14 3A
- Byron
  - 1999–00 3A
  - 2021–22 3A
  - 2023-24 3A

=== Cross country (boys) ===
- Winnebago
  - 1978–79 A (as a member of the Mid-Northern Conference)
  - 2002–03 A
  - 2005–06 A
  - 2007–08 1A
- Oregon
  - 1997–98 A

=== Cross country (girls) ===
- Winnebago
  - 1989–90 A (as a member of the Mid-Northern Conference)
  - 1993–94 A (as a member of the Mid-Northern Conference)
  - 1994–95 A (as a member of the Mid-Northern Conference)
  - 1995–96 A
  - 1999–00 A
  - 2000–01 A
  - 2002–03 A
  - 2005–06 A
  - 2006–07 A
  - 2007–08 1A
  - 2008–09 1A
  - 2009–10 1A
  - 2019–20 1A

=== Golf (boys) ===
- Byron
  - 2007–08 1A
  - 2015–16 1A
  - 2016–17 1A

=== Soccer (boys) ===
- Winnebago
  - 2008–09 1A

=== Basketball (girls) ===
- Byron
  - 2015–16 2A
  - 2016–17 2A

=== Bowling (girls) ===
- Winnebago
  - 2006–07

=== Wrestling (boys) ===
- Harvard
  - 1991–92 A (as a member of the Big Eight Conference)
- Byron
  - 1994–95 A (as a member of the Mid-Northern Conference)
- Oregon
  - 1997–98 A

=== Baseball ===
- Rockford Christian
  - 2014–15 2A

=== Softball ===
- Marengo
  - 2010–11 3A

=== Soccer (girls) ===
- Rockford Lutheran
  - 2006–07 A

=== Track and field (boys) ===
- Oregon
  - 2008–09 1A

=== Track and field (girls) ===
- Genoa-Kingston
  - 1988–89 A (as a member of the Big Eight Conference)
- Byron
  - 2009–10 1A
  - 2010–11 1A

=== Volleyball (Girls) ===
- Genoa-Kingston
  - 2022-23 Class 2A

=== Chess ===
- Stillman Valley
  - 1989–90 A (as a member of the Mid-Northern Conference)

=== Scholastic Bowl ===
- Winnebago
  - 1992–93 A (as a member of the Mid-Northern Conference)
  - 1994–95 A (as a member of the Mid-Northern Conference)
- Byron
  - 1999–00 A
- Stillman Valley
  - 2002–03 A
