= Judah Christian School =

Private Christian school in Champaign, Illinois

Location
- 908 North Prospect Avenue; Champaign, Illinois 61820; United States; 40°7′30″N 88°15′28″W

Information
- School type: Private Christian school
- Religious affiliation: Non-denominational Christian
- Established: 1983
- Superintendent: Blake Porter
- Principal: Tamara Llano
- Grades: Preschool–12
- Gender: Coeducational
- Enrollment: 335
- Campus size: 4 acres (1.6 ha)
- Colors: Purple and gold
- Athletics: Illinois High School Association, Illinois Elementary School Association
- Athletics conference: East Central Illinois Conference
- Team name: The Tribe
- Accreditation: Association of Christian Schools International
- Website: www.judah.org

Judah Christian School is a private, non-denominational Christian school in Champaign, Illinois, United States, serving students from preschool through twelfth grade. Founded in 1983, it is accredited by the Association of Christian Schools International and recognized by the Illinois State Board of Education. Its high school teams, the Tribe, compete in the East Central Illinois Conference of the Illinois High School Association.

== History ==
The school opened in the fall of 1983 and graduated its first high school class, of three students, in 1986. It began with grades 7 through 10 and added a grade each year; Urbana Assembly of Christ discontinued its own seventh- and eighth-grade program to support the new school, which spent its first two years in the Webber Street Church building in Urbana. In the mid-1980s the school bought its current building at 908 North Prospect Avenue, the former Lottie Switzer Elementary School of the Champaign school district, whose original section dates to 1927. Elementary grades were added in 1986 and a preschool in 1991. In the early 1990s the school had about 50 students. A 1999 addition on the north side of the building added a gymnasium with a full-size stage, bringing the building to 75,750 square feet.

By 2006 the school enrolled nearly 500 students, including 112 in the high school, and was outgrowing its four-acre site. School officials examined the former Roberson Transportation building in Mahomet as a possible new home, and the Champaign school district in turn considered buying the Judah building, though neither move went forward. A 2008 proposal to relocate to an industrial area of north Urbana was rejected by that city.

In January 2011 the Champaign City Council rejected, on a 4–4 vote, an annexation agreement that would have let the school buy 50 acres at Kirby Avenue and Rising Road from the developer of the Jacob's Landing subdivision. Opponents objected that the tax-exempt school would not reimburse the city for services on land planned for 120 homes. The school returned with a revised request, and on March 1, 2011, the council approved the purchase 7–1. The school built athletic fields on the property first, giving it home fields for baseball and soccer for the first time after years of renting facilities. In 2018 the school launched a $26 million fundraising campaign, Judah Rising, to build a new preschool-through-12 campus on the site in three phases and announced a planned move for fall 2019; the city council approved the campus layout in 2019. As of 2026 the school continues to operate at its Prospect Avenue building and uses the Rising Road property, which it calls the Field of Dreams, for outdoor athletics.

== Academics ==
Judah describes itself as an interdenominational school; it reported ties to 75 area churches in 2006 and about 60 in 2026. The school offers Advanced Placement courses. A variable tuition program, supported by donors, reduces tuition for families based on need.

== Athletics ==
Judah is a member of the Illinois High School Association and the Illinois Elementary School Association, and its high school teams compete in the East Central Illinois Conference, a conference made up largely of small private schools in central Illinois. The IHSA listed the school's enrollment at 76 for the 2025–26 classification cycle, placing it in Class 1A. The school added football and wrestling programs in the 2018–19 school year under former Champaign Central coach Nate Albaugh. Athletics are offered from fifth grade through high school; outdoor sports play at the Field of Dreams complex on South Rising Road and indoor sports in the gymnasium on Prospect Avenue. The school offers the following sports:

- Archery (coed)
- Baseball (boys)
- Basketball (boys, girls)
- Cheerleading
- Cross country (boys, girls)
- Football (boys)
- Golf (boys, girls)
- Soccer (boys, girls)
- Track and field (boys, girls)
- Volleyball (girls)
- Wrestling

== Student activities ==
The school's arts program includes junior high and high school drama productions each fall and spring, a speech program that competes in tournaments, band for grades 5 through 12, an elective secondary choir, weekly music classes for kindergarten through sixth grade, and art classes. High school students may audition for the JCS Worship Team, a student band that leads the weekly secondary chapel service and performs at churches and community events.
