= Cornerstone Christian Academy (Bloomington, Illinois) =

Location
- 22017 East 1200 North Road; Bloomington, Illinois; United States; 40.4566°N 88.8426°W

Information
- Type: Independent, Private, College Preparatory
- Established: 1997
- Head of school: Beth Sondgeroth
- Faculty: 73
- Grades: PreK−12th
- Enrollment: 510
- Colors: Forest Green and White
- Athletics conference: East Central Illinois Conference
- Mascot: Cyclones
- Newspaper: The Cornerstone Clarion
- Website: http://www.cornerstonechristian.com

Cornerstone Christian Academy (CCA) of McLean County is a private, non-denominational, college-preparatory Christian school located in Bloomington, Illinois. CCA enrolls preschool through 12th grade. It has a total enrollment of over 500 students.

== History ==
In 1997, the Eastview Christian Church preschool was taken over and renamed "Cornerstone Christian Academy of McLean County, Inc.” by founders Becky Shamess and April Kinzinger. In 1998, Cornerstone moved to Grace United Methodist Church in Bloomington, where it accepted students from preschool through 4th grade. It later expanded to three campuses at Faith United Methodist, which housed the preschool; Grace United Methodist held kindergarten through fourth grade; and Second Presbyterian Church for 5th and 6th grade. A new building was constructed outside Bloomington after 78 acres were donated to the school and the new building was opened December 1, 2003. In 2016, a high school addition was completed. The school has been fully accredited since 2006 by the Association of Christian Schools International (ACSI).

== Winterim ==
Cornerstone offers a program held during the first two weeks of January called Winterim. During this time high school students can choose from various credit-earning classes not normally taught during the school year, particularly in the arts and industrial technology. 11th and 12th grade students can select an internship. Students can also travel abroad for study trips during this time.

== Athletics ==
Cornerstone's athletic teams are named the Cyclones, and their school colors are forest green and white. The school participates in the East Central Illinois Conference, and is a member of the Illinois High School Association (IHSA).

=== Middle School Sports ===
- Boys Basketball
- Boys Baseball
- Girls Volleyball
- Cheerleading
- Boys/Girls Cross Country
- Boys/Girls Track
- Girls Basketball

=== High School Sports ===
- Girls Volleyball
- Boys/Girls Basketball
- Boys/Girls Soccer
- Cross Country
- Track
- Golf
- Cheerleading
- Baseball
- Softball
- Bowling
- Bass Fishing

== School activities ==
- Student Council
- School Paper: "The Cornerstone Clarion" (online)
- School Yearbook: "Milestones"
- Drama Club
- Strings
- Scholastic Bowl
- School
- Eternal
- Madrigals
- Pep Band
- Marching Band
- Chess Club
- Book Club
- Worship Band

== School membership associations ==
- Association of Christian Schools International (ACSI)
- Illinois High School Association (IHSA)
- Illinois Elementary School Association (IESA)

== See also ==
- School Website
