= IESA =

IESA may stand for

- Infogrames Entertainment, SA, a French publisher
- Instituto de Estudios Superiores de Administración, a Venezuelan business school
- Illinois Elementary School Association
- Institut d'études supérieures des arts
