= School District 127 =

School District 127 may refer to:

- Grayslake Community High School District 127
- Worth School District 127
