= Northwest Suburban Conference =

Northwest Suburban Conference may refer to:

- Northwest Suburban Conference (Illinois)
- Northwest Suburban Conference (Minnesota)
