= GKHS =

GKHS may refer to:

- Genoa-Kingston High School, in Genoa, Illinois, US
- Grace King High School in Metairie, Louisiana, US
- Graham-Kapowsin High School in Pierce County, Washington, US
