= Woodstock Community Unit School District 200 =

School district in Illinois, United States

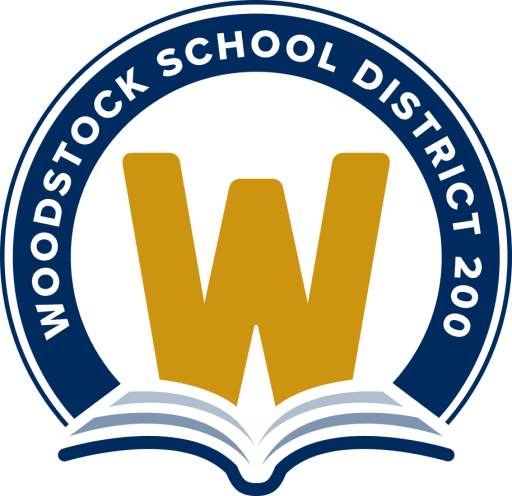
- District 200's Logo as of 2026.

Address
- 2990 Raffel Road Woodstock, Illinois, 60098; United States

District information
- Type: Public
- Grades: PreK–12
- NCES District ID: 1743330

Students and staff
- Students: 6,122 (2020–2021)

Other information
- Website: www.woodstockschools.org

Woodstock Community Unit School District 200 is a public K-12 school district based in Woodstock, Illinois. The school district serves the communities of Woodstock, Bull Valley, Greenwood and the west side of Wonder Lake in McHenry County, Illinois.

== District information ==
Total enrollment for the district is approximately 6,600 students each school year. The current superintendent is Mike Moan.

The district is governed by a seven-member school board.

== Current schools ==
=== Elementary schools ===
- Verda Dierzen Early Learning Center, Woodstock.
  - The school offers classes in early Special Education, bilingual classes and pre-kindergarten. It is named after Mrs. Verda Dierzen, a Woodstock woman who founded the school and taught throughout the district. Dierzen died in April 2008, at age 91. The school's colors are the primary colors; the mascot is the dinosaur. Nearly 830 students are enrolled at Verda Dierzen.
- Dean Street Elementary School, Woodstock
- Mary Endres Elementary School, Woodstock
  - Named for Dr. Mary P. Endres, who served as Superintendent of Schools for Rural Consolidated District 10, a forerunner of District 2000, and later taught at Purdue University and Governors State University.
- Greenwood Elementary School
- Olson Elementary School
- The school opened in 1969 and has an enrolment of 400+. The school colors are Red, White, and black. The mascot is a horse.
- Prairiewood Elementary School
- Westwood Elementary School

=== Middle schools ===
- Creekside Middle School
  - The school opened in September 2007, and has an enrolment of 736. The school colors are Carolina Blue, Navy Blue and white. The school mascot is the Falcon.
- Northwood Middle School

=== High schools ===
- Woodstock High School
- Woodstock North High School
  - School Colors: Black, Teal & Silver. School Mascot: Thunder.

=== Grades 4 through 12 ===
- Clay Academy
