= Rock Falls High School =

Location
- 101 12th Ave; Rock Falls, Illinois 61071; United States
- Coordinates: 41.77933°N 89.70527°W

Information
- Type: Public high school
- Motto: First Class
- Established: 1920; 106 years ago
- Locale: District #301
- NCES District ID: 1734380
- Superintendent: Ron McCord
- Principal: Mike Berentes
- Faculty: 37.00 (FTE)
- Grades: 9-12
- Enrollment: 547 (2023-2024)
- Student to teacher ratio: 14.78
- Colors: Green & Black
- Mascot: Rocket
- Campus: Rural
- Website: www.rfhs301.org

Rock Falls Township High School, better known as Rock Falls High School and its initialism RFHS, is a four-year public high school located in Rock Falls, Illinois.

== History ==
In the late 19th century, secondary education students living in Rock Falls attended classes in the city hall building. By the 1910s, efforts were underway to fund a new school in the form of bonds. Designed by architect Gilbert A. Johnson, designer of the Grandon Civic Center in Sterling, Illinois and several other prominent buildings in the area, construction of the high school was completed in 1920 at an approximate cost of $160,000 (equivalent to $2,430,000 in 2023). In 1953, an addition to the building was approved by the board of education, providing for 15 new classrooms, a cafeteria, industrial shop areas, music rooms, and a 3,000 seat gymnasium.

Three area middle schools feed into the high school: Rock Falls Middle School, Montmorency School, and East Coloma-Nelson School.

== Academics ==
=== Profile ===
In the 2022-2023 school year, the student population was predominantly White (69.3%) with 392 students. Hispanic students made up 22.6% of the population with 128 students. Smaller racial groups included Black students (2.8%) with 16 students, American Indian/Alaska Native (0.4%) with 2 students, Asian (0.2%) with 1 student, and two or more races (4.8%) with 27 students. The student body was nearly evenly split by gender, with 280 male and 286 female students enrolled. Nearly 60% of enrolled students are eligible for federal free or reduced lunch programs. In 2009, the school received $60,121 in Title I grant funding as part of the American Recovery and Reinvestment Act.

Rock Falls High School has a 16:1 student-teacher ratio and a drop-out rate of 2.9%. In recent years, student enrollment has experienced notable decline. In 2018, the school had 645 students, peaking at 654 in 2019. However, by 2023, the number further decreased to 547, marking a drop of nearly 20% over five years.

Students at the school are given standardized tests in the 11th grade. In 2023, only 17.7% of students met or exceeded standards on the mathematics section of the SAT, compared to 26.7% of all comparable Illinois students. In the same year, 33.1% of students met or exceeded standards on the English language arts section, slightly outperforming the state average of 31.6%. On the Illinois Science Assessment in the same year, only 48.4% of students met or exceeded standards, compared to 52.2% statewide.

=== Curriculum ===
The Rock Falls High School curriculum includes traditional high school academic subjects, advanced academic classes, music, art, and foreign language, as well as programs in business and industrial education. To graduate, Rock Falls Township High School students must complete 22 credits, with requirements in English (3.5 credits), Math (3 credits), Science (2 credits), Social Studies (2 credits), and various electives. The school offers 5 college-level Advanced Placement courses for college credit. Students are also provided the option to enroll in dual credit courses via partnership with the nearby Sauk Valley Community College in Dixon, Illinois.

== Extracurricular activities ==
=== Athletics ===
Rock Falls' athletic teams are known as the "Rockets" or "Lady Rockets" and the freshman football team is technically the "Meteors" but is still referred to as the "Rockets". From 1942 until 2011, Rock Falls competed in the North Central Illinois Conference, the oldest high school athletic conference in Illinois. When that conference dissolved in 2011, Rock Falls joined the Big Northern Conference, where they are a member of the West Division.

In 1999, the Rock Falls boys' basketball team captured its first Class A state title, winning 45-43 at Carver Arena in Peoria, Illinois against Gibault Catholic High School with a buzzer beater three-point shot.

== Notable alumni ==
- Frank Harts (born 1979), American film, television, and theatre actor
- Jakob Junis (born 1992), Major League Baseball pitcher
- David Turk, United States Deputy Secretary of Energy
