= Rockford Lutheran School =

Location
- 3411 N. Alpine Rd. Rockford, Illinois; United States; 42.310450°N 89.027385°W

Information
- Type: Private K-12 school
- Motto: Igniting Minds and Souls
- Religious affiliation: Lutheranism
- Denomination: Lutheran Church–Missouri Synod; Evangelical Lutheran Church in America
- Established: 1964; 62 years ago
- Grades: K-12
- Gender: Co-educational
- Colors: Purple and white
- Athletics: Big Northern Conference
- Mascot: Crusader
- Website: www.rockfordlutheran.org

Rockford Lutheran School is a private K-12 school in Rockford, Illinois. Established in 1964, Rockford Lutheran School is associated with 25 area Lutheran Churches. The Lutheran churches have associations with both ELCA and LCMS. Students attend more than 100 area churches; 49% attend a Lutheran church. More than 2,000 students have graduated from Rockford Lutheran High School since the first graduating class in 1969. The school's mascot is the Crusader and the school colors are purple and white.

== Athletics and extra-curricular activity ==
The high school (grades 9–12) competes in the Big Northern Conference, as does the junior high school (grades 7–8). The school has three gymnasiums, a lighted track and field complex, a baseball field, a softball field, and a weight room.

=== Athletics ===
- Boys - baseball, basketball, bowling, cross country, football, golf, soccer, tennis, track, wrestling, bass fishing, and volleyball.
- Girls - basketball, bowling, cross country, golf, soccer, softball, Spirit Squad, tennis, track, volleyball, bass fishing, and swimming

== Notable alumni ==
- James Robinson, running back for the New York Jets
- Stephanie Raymond, guard for the Chicago Sky
