= East Central Illinois Conference =

High school athletic conference in Central Illinois, USA

- Conference: IHSA
- Founded: 2007
- Sports fielded: 6 (3 Boys, 3 Girls)
- No. of teams: 9
- Region: Central Illinois

The East Central Illinois Conference or ECIC, is a high school athletic conference in Central Illinois. 6 out of the 9 schools are private schools.

== Member schools ==
East Central Illinois Conference Members

There are 9 member schools in the Conference. Greenview High School joined the ECIC in the 2018-19 academic year.

School	Location (Population)	Mascot	Colors	Affiliation	2017 9–12 enrollment	School website
Arthur Christian School	Arthur, Illinois (2,288)	Conquering Riders	Red and Navy	Non-denominational	NA	https://www.arthurchristian.org/
Calvary Christian Academy	Normal, Illinois (52,497)	Knights	Red and Blue	Baptist	52 / 85.80 (multiplied)	http://www.ccanormal.org
Christ Lutheran High School	Buckley, Illinois (600)	Crusaders	Purple and White	Lutheran LCMS	7 / 11.55 (multiplied)	https://www.christlutheranbuckley.com
Cornerstone Christian Academy	Bloomington, Illinois (76,610)	Cyclones	Green and White	Non-denominational	108 / 178.20 (multiplied)	https://www.cornerstonechristian.com
Decatur Christian School	Forsyth, Illinois (3,490)	Warriors	Blue and Gold	Non-denominational	50 / 82.50 (multiplied)	http://decaturchristian.net/
DeLand-Weldon High School	De Land, Illinois (446)	Eagles	Maroon and Gray	Public	54	https://www.dwschools.org/
Greenview High School	Greenview, Illinois (778)	Bulldogs	Red and Black	Public	69	http://www.greenviewschools.org/
Judah Christian School	Champaign, Illinois (81,055)	The Tribe	Purple and Gold	Non-denominational	131 / 216.15 (multiplied)	https://www.judah.org
University of Illinois Laboratory High School	Urbana, Illinois (41,250)	Illineks	Navy Blue and Orange	Public	241 / 397.65 (multiplied)	https://uni.illinois.edu/

=== Former members ===
School	Location (Population)	Mascot	Colors	Affiliation	2017 9–12 enrollment	Year Departed	Conference Joined	School website
Unity Christian School	Decatur, Illinois (76,122)	Lions	Red and Black	Private	110 / 181.50 (multiplied)	2013–14	Little Okaw Valley Conference	https://www.unitydecatur.org/

== Sports ==
The following are the sports offered by the East Central Illinois Conference:

Fall Sports

- Boys Soccer
- Girls Volleyball

Winter Sports

- Boys Basketball
- Girls Basketball

Spring Sports

- Baseball
- Girls Soccer

== IHSA State level successes ==
Two out of the eight schools have place in IHSA State Finals.

- Cornerstone Christian Academy-
  Boys Soccer: 4th place 2016-17 (1A)
- Boys Basketball: 4th place 2022-23 (1A)
- Track & Field: Ridge Willard (pole vault) 2021, 2022
- University of Illinois Laboratory High School-
  Boys Cross Country: 3rd place 1995-96 (A).
  Boys Soccer: 4th place 2015-16 (1A), 2nd place 2012-13 (1A).
  Girls Cross Country: 3rd place 1988-89 (A) and 1991-92 (A), 2nd place 2014-15 (1A) and 2015-16 (1A).
  Girls Track and Field: 3rd place 1984-85 (A) and 1989-90 (A), 2nd place 1990-91 (A).
  Journalism: 2nd place 2007-08 and 2011–12, State Champion 2008-09.
  Scholastic Bowl: 4th place 2013-14 (A), 2nd place 2016-17 (2A), State Champion 2014-15 (A).
  Team Chess: 3rd place 1982-83 (A), 1984-85 (A), 1992-93 (A). 2nd place 1975-76 (A), 1979-80 (A), 1988-89 (A). State Champion 1977-78 (A), 1978-79 (A), 1985-86 (A), 1990-91 (A), 1991-92 (A), 1993-94 (A), 2008-09.

== See also ==
- List of Illinois High School Association member conferences
