= Sam Saboura =

American TV host, stylist, fashion journalist,

Sam Saboura is a television personality, stylist and personal shopper best known for appearing on the US American series Extreme Makeover. He has appeared as the fashion and style expert on various entertainment, news, and awards programs.

== Education and career ==
Saboura was born in Park Ridge to Ilham O’Neill, a fashion designer. He graduated from Johnsburg High School in McHenry County, Illinois in 1991. He went on to graduate from the University of Iowa with a degree in theater, before working as a celebrity personal shopper.

He appeared on the ABC show Extreme Makeover from 2003 to 2007, during which time he had two books published. He co-hosted Something Borrowed, Something New on TLC with designer Kelly Nishimoto from 2013 to 2014. Alongside working in television, as of 2015 he was working in various other roles such as design, styling, and as a teacher at School of Style in Los Angeles. As of 2022 he was creative director of DG2, the clothing brand of shopping channel personality Diane Gilman.

== Books ==
- Sam Saboura's Real Style: Style Secrets for Real Women with Real Bodies, Clarkson-Potter (2005) ISBN 1-4000-9771-1
- My Real Style: A Makeover Journal, Potter Style (2006) ISBN 0-307-33629-8
