= Byron High School (Byron, Illinois) =

Coordinates: 42°07′52″N 89°15′57″W

Location
- 696 N. Colfax; Byron, Illinois; Byron, Ogle, Illinois 61010; United States

Information
- School district: District 226
- Superintendent: Buster Barton
- Principal: Jay Mullens
- Teaching staff: 39.03 (FTE)
- Grades: 9-12
- Student to teacher ratio: 11.89
- Colors: Orange and black
- Athletics conference: Big Northern Conference
- Team name: Tigers
- Rival: Stillman Valley High School
- Alumni: Troy Drake
- Website: bhs.byron226.org

Byron High School is located in the small city of Byron, Illinois population: 3,284. Byron High School is located 17 miles southwest from Rockford, Illinois, the state's third largest city.

== Revenue ==
Taxes from the Byron Nuclear Generating Station play a critical role in the school's funding. In 2006 Byron passed a referendum that raised property taxes in order to build a new middle school and add a new wing onto Byron High School. The new Byron High School wing was completed in winter 2007. The new Byron Middle School, completed as of summer 2009, is currently in use.

== Colors and mascot ==
The Byron school colors are orange, black and white. The school mascot is the tiger.

== Activities ==
Byron High school offers several sports and extra curricular activities for its student body. Non-athletic activities include: Chess, Scholastic Bowl, Speech Team, Drama Club, Worldwide Youth in Science and Engineering, National Honor Society, Foreign Language Club, Future Farmers of America, Band, Chorus, Art Club, Student Council, Yearbook, Mission Statement Club, and Key Club.

The Byron Scholastic Bowl qualified for the State Finals eight times (twice in combined field, six times in Class A), winning the Class A State Championship in 2000 and placing second in 1997, 2008, and 2018. The WYSE Team also captured two state championships in 2015 and 2017.

== Athletics ==
Byron High School competes in the Big Northern Conference. Athletic activities include: Basketball, Volleyball, Track, Cross Country, Football, Golf, Softball, Baseball, Swimming, Bowling and Soccer.

Byron's Football team won the Class 3A state championship in 1999, finishing with a record of 14–0. The team set the state's single-season scoring record by scoring a total of 673 points. That record has since been surpassed. Byron's Football team reached the IHSA Class 3A state championship game in back to back years in 2018 and 2019, losing both times by 4 points. Byron also won 3 Class 3A state championships game in 2021, 2023 and 2025.

The Byron High School Wrestling team won the 1994-95 Illinois Class A state championship with a record of 22–2. The team also finished as the state runner-up in the 1998–99 season with a record of 23–3.

Byron's Boys' Golf team won the state title in 2007, 2015, and 2016.

== Officers ==
The current Superintendent is Buster Barton.

Other superintendents have included Margaret Fostiak, who was terminated by the Byron School Board in 2011. Dr. James Hammack followed Dr. Fostiak as Superintendent until the Spring of 2018.

The current Board of Education is listed on the District 226 webpage.

The principal of Byron High School is Andrew Donaldson.

== Notable alumni ==
- Troy Drake - Philadelphia Eagles
- Sean Considine - Baltimore Ravens
