= Adolf Benca =

American painter

Adolf Benca (born 16 May 1959) is an American painter of Slovak origin.

== Early life and beginnings ==
Benca was born on 16 May 1959, in Bratislava, Czechoslovakia. He was the older of two children, the younger being his sister Lubica. His family immigrated to the United States when he was ten years old, in 1969. From 1969 to 1973 he attended the Elementary Private School in Chicago. He attended Grayslake High School in Illinois between 1973 and 1977.

He became interested in art very early in his life, attending several art schools in Chicago while he was an elementary student.

In 1966, while he was still living in Czechoslovakia, he was already illustrating children's books. In 1968, a year prior to his family emigrating from Czechoslovakia, because of Russian occupation of Bratislava, his family moved to Vienna, where young Benca became interested in philosophy and started painting mythological themes and subjects. He participated in a few young artist programs in 1970 and 1975.

== Studies ==
Adolf Benca studied and graduated from several universities. From 1977 to 1981 he studied at The Cooper Union for the Advancement of Science and Art, art school in New York, where he received his B.F.A. (Bachelor of Fine Arts) degree. For the next four years (1982–1985) he studied at the Columbia University College of Physicians and Surgeons, graduating at 1987, receiving the title of Master of Fine Arts (M.F.A.). From 1987 to 1988 he studied the human anatomy at the University of Bologna in Italy where he received the title "Doctor honoris causa" (Dr.h.c.) in the area of anatomy. At University Johns Hopkins in Baltimore, Maryland he received the title "Doctor honoris causa" in the area of philosophy.

== Career ==
As he was receiving his titles and studied, Benca continued to paint and exhibit his works in many galleries around the world, many of his paintings ending up in private collections.

In 1985 he became a member of the Swizzero di Roma.

In 1987 he became a member of the French Academy in Rome.

In 1988 he became a member of the American Academy in Rome.

In 1994 he became a member of the Swedish Institute in Rome.

In 2000 he became a member of the Academy of Arts in Berlin.

After "the Fall of the Iron Curtain" he decided to continue his career in Central and Eastern Europe.

In 2002 he started his work in Prague, and was awarded the award of the "Masaryk Academy".

On the barges under "Floating Galleries" he is exhibiting most of his artwork created from 2000 to 2013.

In 2012 Adolf Benca and the "Bratislava's ship company" a.d. (Bratislavská lodná spoločnosť a. s ) have founded the company "Adolf Benca Académia s.r.o.".

In 2013 this project was internationally accepted at "Brussels Symposium" EBU (European Barge Union).

The partner in realization of this international project is the "European Fine Art Fair".

His works can be found all over the world, in private collections, as well as exhibits at museums, such as "Metropolitan Museum" and "Museum of Modern Art" in New York.

=== World art institutions exhibiting the artwork of Adolf Benca ===
Institution
Museum of Modern Art, New York, NY – MoMA
Metropolitan Museum of Art, New York, NY
National Art Gallery, Washington, D.C.
Fred Jones Jr. Museum of Art, The University of Oklahoma
High Museum of Art Atlanta
Musei Vatikani, Vatikan, Rome
Williams College Museum of Art, Williamstown, Massachusetts
Arkansas Arts Center Foundation Collection, Little Rock, Arkansas
Henry Art Gallery at the University of Washington, Seattle
Contemporary Art Museum, Tel Aviv
Art Museum, Hong Kong
Floating Galleries of the Slovakia, Bratislava
National Gallery of the Slovakia, Bratislava

=== Standalone exhibitions ===
Year	Exhibition
Current events: December 2016 - February 2017	Exhibition Stigma, Nis, Serbia, dedicated to the reformer of Christianity Constantine the Great and launching the petition for conciliation of the Catholic and Orthodox Church.
2013–2014	Permanent Installation, Danube, "Fleeces of Aha", Bratislava, Slovakia
2005	Michalelsa Brana Galleria, Bratislava, Paintings on Iraq
2003	International Kommerz Bank Gallery, Bratislava
May 2001	Pantheon of Arts & Sciences, Kulturnom Dome, Budapest
November 2000	UNESCO-NWICO Austria-Slovakia New World Information Exhibition Foundation
November 2000	Pantheon of Arts & Sciences, Kulturnom Dome, Stupava, Slovakia
November 2000	Aesthetic Gallery, House of Culture, Stupava, Slovakia
September 2000	Slovak Exhibition, Cantos, Washington, DC
January 2000	Seton Hall University School of Law, Portraits, History of Law
February 1999	United Nations, Work from the Sudan
October 1998	Jazz Drawings, New York City
Sept/October 1998	Inkubus Gallery, Miami, Florida, Paintings, "Birth of Continents"
May/July 1998	Inkubus Gallery, Miami, Florida, Drawings, "Encyclopedia"
April 1998	Inkubus Gallery, Miami, Florida, Tempera Paintings
March 1998	Inkubus Gallery, Miami, Florida, Drawings
February 1998	Inkubus Gallery, Miami, Florida, Paintings
February 1998	Seton Hall University School of Law, Jazz Drawings
November 1997	Inkubus Gallery, Miami, Florida, Tempera Paintings
August/Sept 1997	Inkubus Gallery, Miami, Florida, Drawings
May 1997	Inkubus Gallery, Miami, Florida, Paintings
April 1997	Embassy of Slovakia, Washington, D.C.
October 1996	Seton Hall University School of Law, Medical Portrait Drawings
May 1996	Baldachino Gallery, New York City
January 1996	M-13 Gallery, New York
May 1994	Sterling Gallery, Chicago, Illinois
May 1993	Sterling Gallery, Chicago, Illinois
December 1992	M-13 Gallery, New York
September 1991	M-13 Gallery
1988	Galerie LcCargo/Galerie Losange, Grenoble
1988	Twining Gallery, New York
1988	ARTE FIERE, Bologna
1987	Saint-Gaudens National Historic Site, Cornish, NH
1986	Twining Gallery, New York
1985	Gallery Jean-Yves Noblet, Paris
1985	Twining Gallery, New York
1984	Twining Gallery, New York
1983	Paul Olsen Gallery, New York
1983	Twining Gallery, New York
1982	Alexander Carlson Gallery, New York
1981	Arthur A. Houghton Gallery, The Cooper Union, New York

=== Group exhibitions ===
Year	Exhibition
2014	Matica Slovenska, "Cultural Revolutions", Martin, Slovakia
October 1998	United Nations, Artists From Slovakia
June 1996	Arkansas Arts Center Foundation Collection
February 1995	Achim Moeller Fine Art, New York
September 1995	Achim Moeller Fine Art, Salon des Beaux Arts, Paris
May 1994	Kennesaw State College, Marietta, Georgia
May 1992	Gallery Three Zero, New York, AMFAR benefit
January 1992	The Cooper Union, "Good Work" by recent alumni
1991	Stuart Levy Gallery, New York
1991	Twining Gallery, New York, Drawings on War
1991	M-13 Gallery, New York
1990	M-13 Gallery, New York
1990	Stuart Levy Gallery, New York
1990	Achim Moeller Fine Art, New York
1989	Achim Moeller Fine Art, New York
1988	Czechoslovak Society of Arts & Sciences, Washington, D.C.
1988	Queens Museum, New York
1988	Twining Gallery, New York
1986	Gallery Two Nine One, Atlanta
1986	Georgia Museum of Art, Athens
1986	Twining Gallery, New York
1986	The Ewing Gallery of Art & Architecture, University of Tennessee
1985	Canadian Art Galleries, Calgary
1985	Twining Gallery, New York
1984	Brenda Kroos Gallery, Columbus, Ohio
1984	Deborah Sharpe Gallery, New York
1984	Czechoslovak Society of Arts & Sciences, Montreal
1983	Paul Olsen Gallery, New York
1982	Paul Olsen Gallery, New York
1981	Allan Stone Gallery, New York
1981	Alexander Carlson Gallery

=== Works ===
In his repertoire of works, some of the most notable ones are:

- “Rabbinic dispute“ – 120 × 200 cm, technique: oil and acrylic on canvas, created in 2012. It is currently located in the Floating galleries.
- “Nurse“ – 180 × 180 cm, technique: acrylic on canvas created in 2004. Currently located in the Floating galleries.
- “Spanish influenza" – 196 × 281 cm, technique: acrylic on canvas, created in 2003. In the Floating gallery Tabor.
- “Dialogues of the Dead Series: Triptych 1, Triptych 2, Triptych 3“ – 300 × 400 cm (each of 3 parts), technique: acrylic on carpet created in 2003. At Adolf Benca Academy Ltd.
- “Winner on the cross“ – 300 × 200 cm, technique: acrylic, an industrial paint and tar on the carpet, created in 2003. Located at the Floating galleries.
- “She” – 200 × 300 cm, technique: acrylic, an industrial paint and tar on the carpet, created in 2003. Located at the Floating galleries.
- "The Way to the Northwest" – a collection of 16 paintings; various dimensions; painting technique: acrylic on wood. This collection was exhibited at the European Parliament in Brussels. In the private property of the collectors.
- Limited edition "Stigma 54“ – contains 54 art works that characterize and represent „Stigma“ (seal) which in Ancient Rome and Ancient Greece was used to stigmatize slaves, criminals, prostitutes, traitors and mentally ill people. The works have various dimensions: height 11,81 – 17,72 inches x width 17,72 – 25,59 inches; painting technique: acrylic on wood, 2012. Owned by various members of the Alliance of Adolf Benca Academy. These art works could afford only the privileged collectors all over the world.

The artworks that have been exhibited in the European Parliament since the first of July 2016 regarding the chairmanship of the Slovak Republic in European Union:

- “€=mc2” (Portrait of Otto von Habsburg) – 175 × 141 cm, oil on canvas, created in 2011. As of July 2016 located at the European Union Parliament.
- “Waterways – Northwest Passage, No.1” – 57 × 149 cm, oil on canvas, created in 2012. As of July 2016 located at the European Union Parliament.
- “Waterways – Northwest Passage, No.7” – 55 × 112 cm, oil on canvas, created in 2009. As of July 2016 located at the European Union Parliament.
- “Waterways – Northwest Passage, No.13” – 50 × 140 cm, oil on canvas, created in 2012. As of July 2016 located at the European Union Parliament.
- “Waterways – Northwest Passage, No.14” – 82 × 102 cm, oil on canvas, created in 2012. As of July 2016 located at the European Union Parliament.
