= Something Borrowed, Something New =

- Genre: Reality
- Created by: Florence Deprez-Wright; Tanya Gill
- Presented by: Kelly Nishimoto; Sam Saboura
- Narrated by: Heath Brandon
- Country of origin: United States
- Original language: English
- No. of seasons: 3
- No. of episodes: 54

Production
- Executive producer: Jennifer Heftler
- Running time: 22 minutes
- Production company: Trium Entertainment

Original release
- Network: TLC
- Release: February 8, 2013 – December 4, 2014

Something Borrowed, Something New is an American reality television series that premiered February 8, 2013, on TLC. Hosted by Kelly Nishimoto and Sam Saboura, brides-to-be are able to choose between a new designer dress or their reimagined heirloom.

On April 18, 2014, the series was renewed for a third season, which premiered on October 10, 2014.

== Episodes ==
Season	Episodes	Originally released	
Season	Episodes	First released	Last released
1	14	February 8, 2013	April 12, 2013
2	20	January 3, 2014	April 19, 2014
3	20	October 10, 2014	December 16, 2014

=== Season 1 (2013) ===
No. overall	No. in season	Title	Original release date	U.S. viewers (millions)
1	1	"The Bride Who Won't Decide"	February 8, 2013	1.15
2	2	"Don't Mess With the Latina Juju"	February 8, 2013	1.21
3	3	"Smother of the Bride"	February 15, 2013	1.20
4	4	"A 1913 Dress for a 2013 Bride"	February 15, 2013	1.24
5	5	"A Blogger's Bridal Bliss"	February 22, 2013	1.20
6	6	"Dad's Bride and Joy"	February 22, 2013	1.05
7	7	"Bridal Culture Clash"	March 1, 2013	1.42
8	8	"Everyone's Got an Opinion"	March 1, 2013	1.28
9	9	"Burlesque Bride"	March 8, 2013	1.22
10	10	"Bridal Runaround"	March 15, 2013	1.03
11	11	"Bridal Cover Up"	March 22, 2013	1.44
12	12	"Cling-on Mom"	March 29, 2013	1.44
13	13	"A Bride's Right to Bear Arms"	April 5, 2013	1.27
14	14	"Dazed and I Do's"	April 12, 2013	1.12

=== Season 2 (2014) ===
No. overall	No. in season	Title	Original release date	U.S. viewers (millions)
15	1	"The Blinged-Out Jersey Bride"	January 3, 2014	1.27
16	2	"Daddy's Girl"	January 3, 2014	1.27
17	3	"Can You Drop It Like It's Hot?"	January 10, 2014	1.42
18	4	"Maybe I Won't Pay for the Wedding!"	January 10, 2014	1.46
19	5	"Tall Order Bride"	January 17, 2014	1.18
20	6	"This Dress Kicks Your Dress to the Curb"	January 17, 2014	1.14
21	7	"If The Gown Fits..."	January 24, 2014	1.27
22	8	"The 007 Bride"	January 24, 2014	1.21
23	9	"Mom's Pride and Joi"	January 31, 2014	N/A
24	10	"That WOW Factor!"	January 31, 2014	N/A
25	11	"The Young and the Dress-less"	February 14, 2014	N/A
26	12	"Best Stressed Bride"	February 21, 2014	N/A
27	13	"I Feel Like a Ghost Bride!"	February 28, 2014	N/A
28	14	"Whose Sari Now"	March 7, 2014	N/A
29	15	"With This Bling, I Thee Wed"	March 14, 2014	N/A
30	16	"This Bride Was Made for Dancing"	March 21, 2014	N/A
31	17	"Say Less to the Dress"	March 28, 2014	N/A
32	18	"The Sisterhood of the Traveling Dress"	April 4, 2014	N/A
33	19	"Torn Between Two Mothers"	April 11, 2014	N/A
34	20	"Dress Reversal"	April 18, 2014	N/A

=== Season 3 (2014) ===
No. overall	No. in season	Title	Original release date	U.S. viewers (millions)
35	1	"Something Kelly!"	October 10, 2014	N/A
36	2	"Bride Gone Wild"	October 10, 2014	N/A
37	3	"Southern Barbie Bride"	October 17, 2014	N/A
38	4	"Fashion or Family?"	October 17, 2014	1.46
39	5	"Bride of Liberace"	October 24, 2014	N/A
40	6	"From Active Duty to Bridal Beauty"	October 24, 2014	N/A
41	7	"Beauty & the Beach"	November 7, 2014	N/A
42	8	"Wedding Belles"	November 7, 2014	1.21
43	9	"From Country Cotton to Beachy Bling"	November 14, 2014	N/A
44	10	"I Want to Be Buried in This Dress"	November 14, 2014	N/A
45	11	"From Yee-haw to Vavavoom!"	November 21, 2014	N/A
46	12	"I'm Not a Frumpy Milkmaid!"	November 21, 2014	N/A
47	13	"Tiny Bride, Big Problems"	November 28, 2014	N/A
48	14	"Damn You, Sexy Dress!"	November 28, 2014	N/A
49	15	"Love on a List"	December 5, 2014	N/A
50	16	"Bridal Muscle Show"	December 5, 2014	N/A
51	17	"My Big Fat Persian Wedding"	December 19, 2014	N/A
52	18	"Here Comes the Groom"	December 19, 2014	N/A
53	19	"Bling vs. Sibling"	December 26, 2014	N/A
54	20	"The Not-So-Princess Bride"	December 26, 2014	N/A
