= Michael Liedtke =

American football player (born 1992)

No. 67
- Position: Offensive guard

Personal information
- Born: January 15, 1992 (age 34); Woodstock, Illinois, U.S.
- Listed height: 6 ft 3 in (1.91 m)
- Listed weight: 305 lb (138 kg)

Career information
- High school: Woodstock
- College: Illinois State
- NFL draft: 2015: undrafted

Career history
- Miami Dolphins (2015)*; Kansas City Chiefs (2015–2016)*; New York Jets (2016)*; Cleveland Browns (2016)*; Tampa Bay Buccaneers (2016–2019); Washington Football Team (2020)
- * Offseason or practice squad member only

Career NFL statistics
- Games played: 10
- Stats at Pro Football Reference

Michael Liedtke (born January 15, 1992) is an American former professional football player who was an offensive guard in the National Football League (NFL). He played college football for the Illinois State Redbirds and signed as an undrafted free agent with the Miami Dolphins in 2015. He was also a member of several other NFL teams.

== Professional career ==
=== Miami Dolphins ===
Liedtke signed with the Miami Dolphins as an undrafted free agent on May 8, 2015. He was waived on September 5, 2015 and was later signed to the practice squad on September 28, 2015. He was released on October 6, 2015.

=== Kansas City Chiefs ===
On October 13, 2015, Liedtke was signed to the Kansas City Chiefs' practice squad. He signed a reserve/future contract with the Chiefs on January 18, 2016. He was waived on May 9, 2016.

=== New York Jets ===
On June 3, 2016, Liedtke was signed by the New York Jets. He was waived on September 3, 2016.

=== Cleveland Browns ===
On October 5, 2016, Liedtke was signed to the Cleveland Browns' practice squad. He was released on October 26, 2016.

=== Tampa Bay Buccaneers ===
On November 22, 2016, Liedtke was signed to the Tampa Bay Buccaneers' practice squad. He signed a reserve/future contract with the Buccaneers on January 2, 2017.

On September 2, 2017, Liedtke was waived by the Buccaneers and was signed to the practice squad the next day. He was promoted to the active roster on December 2, 2017. He was waived/injured on August 7, and was placed on injured reserve after clearing waivers on August 8. Liedtke did not receive an exclusive-rights free agent tender from the Buccaneers after the 2019 season and became a free agent.

=== Washington Football Team ===
Liedtke signed a one-year contract with the Washington Football Team on May 9, 2020. He was placed on injured reserve on September 5, 2020, before being waived on November 17, 2020.
