= Round Lake Area Schools =

School district in Illinois, United States

Coordinates: 42°21′16.7″N 88°6′11.9″W

Address
- 442 N Cedar Lake Rd Round Lake, Lake County, Illinois, 60073; United States

District information
- Motto: Inspire and empower students to construct a thriving future
- Grades: Pre K-12
- Established: July 27, 1968; 57 years ago
- Superintendent: Dr. Donn Mendoza
- Deputy superintendent(s): Heather Bennett
- Schools: 9
- NCES District ID: 1734990

Students and staff
- Students: 6,190
- Teachers: 518 (23-24)
- Staff: 1,035 (23-24)
- Student–teacher ratio: 17:1
- Colors: Blue and Gold

Other information
- Website: www.rlas-116.org

Round Lake Area Schools, also known as Round Lake School District and sometimes identified as Community Unit School District 116, is a school district based in Round Lake, Illinois.

== Schools ==
The district operates a High School and a number of middle and elementary schools.

• Round Lake Senior High School (Panthers)

• John T. Magee Middle School (Cougars)

• Round Lake Middle School (Wildcats)

• Beach Elementary School (Bobcats)

• Ellis Elementary School (Eagles)

• Indian Hill Elementary School (Chiefs)

• Murphy Elementary School (Mustangs)

• Village Elementary School (Vikings)

• Early Education Center (Dolphins)
