= Genoa-Kingston High School =

Location
- 980 Park Avenue; Genoa, Illinois 60135; United States; 42°06′05″N 88°42′13″W

Information
- Type: Public high school
- Motto: "small town school, BIG time pride"
- Principal: Matthew Cascio
- Teaching staff: 37.20 (FTE)
- Enrollment: 468 (2023–2024)
- Average class size: 21 (2013)
- Student to teacher ratio: 12.58
- Color
- Athletics conference: Big Northern Conference
- Nickname: Cogs
- Website: www.gkschools.org/o/high-school

Genoa-Kingston High School is a public high school located in Genoa, Illinois. The school has an enrollment of 617.

== About the school ==
Genoa-Kingston High School is located in DeKalb County in Northern Illinois. The high school is part of the Genoa-Kingston School District #424 which comprises the two communities of Genoa and Kingston, Illinois.

GKHS offers a variety of curricular courses in the areas of math, science, foreign language, English, career and technical education, physical education and fitness, fine arts, social sciences, and special education. The high school is also a member of the Kishwaukee Education Consortium, where juniors and seniors are offered the opportunity to explore a variety of technical classes being conducted with students from neighboring districts.

In the areas of extra curricular activities, students may become involved in drama, music, athletics, and various clubs and organizations. Students are encouraged to become involved in activities as this is viewed as the way to further enhance the learning experience.

== Current education ==
Genoa-Kingston High School has an average class size of 21. The average ACT score for GKHS is 19.2, compared to Illinois’ state average of 20.3.

== Athletics ==
Genoa-Kingston High School competes in the Big Northern Conference. Sports include:

- Baseball
- Basketball
- Cheerleading
- Cross Country
- Football
- Golf
- Soccer
- Softball
- Track and Field
- Volleyball
- Wrestling
