= Kishwaukee River Conference =

Organization of eight high schools in northern Illinois

- Conference: IHSA
- Founded: 2016
- No. of teams: 8
- Region: Northern Illinois (McHenry, Kendall, and DeKalb counties)

Locations of KRC Schools

The Kishwaukee River Conference (KRC) is an organization of eight high schools in northern Illinois. These high schools are members of the Illinois High School Association.

== History ==
On November 8, 2013, it was announced that Woodstock and Woodstock North planned to leave the Fox Valley Conference by 2015 and create a new conference. After rumors that members of the Big Northern Conference's East Division might join this new conference, it was announced on November 19 that five BNC members - Burlington Central, Genoa-Kingston, Harvard, Johnsburg (which at the time was still in the Fox Valley Conference but was joining the BNC as the start of the 2014–15 school year), Marengo, and Richmond-Burton were invited to join the new conference, creating a proposed 8-team conference. The next day, it was announced that the name for this new conference will be the Kishwaukee River Conference. In February 2014, it was reported that Harvard and Genoa-Kingston had decided to remain in the BNC, while Richmond-Burton and Johnsburg remained undecided; Harvard later announced that they would, in fact, leave the BNC for the KRC, with the first season of the KRC to be during the 2016–17 school year. In June 2014, Richmond-Burton and Johnsburg both voted to officially become charter members of the KRC in 2016.

On July 19, 2017, the KRC voted 5–1 to remove Burlington Central from the conference, effective following the 2018–19 school year. Burlington Central will join the Fox Valley Conference starting in the 2019–20 school year.

In 2021, the KRC entered into a football partnership with the Interstate Eight Conference. The partnership creates two divisions for football, one consisting of the 7 smallest schools across the two conferences and one consisting of the 7 largest schools. In the 2021–22 season, the "Blue" division will include Harvard, Johnsburg, Marengo, and Richmond-Burton, while the "White" division will include Woodstock and Woodstock North. The KRC will play its own conference schedule again in 2024.

In 2022, Sandwich High School and Plano High School pledged to join the Kishwaukee River Conference, starting in the 2023–24 season, leaving the Interstate 8.

== Membership ==
The conference's current members, as of 2023–24:

School	Town	Team name	Colors	Year Joined	Enrollment	IHSA Classes 2/3/4 (Note: The state series class which a school competes in not only depends on the school's student population, but on the sport or activity. Some activities divide schools into two classes, some into three, and others into four. The listing here is in the order of two class, three class, and four class. The more "A"s in a class, the larger the schools competing. For more information on this, see Illinois High School Association#State Series Format.) (Note: Schools are not assigned a classification for football until they have qualified for the playoffs each year. A school's classification not only depends on their student population, but on the populations of the other schools who have qualified. Thus, some schools routinely move between classes.)
Harvard High School	Harvard	Hornets		2016	778	A/2A/3A
Johnsburg High School	Johnsburg	Skyhawks		2016	467	A/1A/2A
Marengo Community High School	Marengo	Indians		2016	661	A/2A/2A
Plano High School	Plano	Reapers		2023	736	A/2A/3A
Richmond-Burton Community High School	Richmond	Rockets		2016	524	A/2A/3A
Sandwich High School	Sandwich	Indians		2023	563	A/2A/2A
Woodstock High School	Woodstock	Blue Streaks		2016	938	AA/2A/3A
Woodstock North High School	Woodstock	Thunder		2016	910	A/2A/3A

=== Previous Members ===
School	Town	Team Name	Colors	Year Joined	Year Left	Total Years	Current Conference
Central High School	Burlington	Rockets		2016	2019	3	Fox Valley Conference

== State championships ==
Three IHSA State Championships have been earned by members of the KRC.

=== Football ===
- Richmond-Burton
  - 2019–20 4A

=== Competitive Cheerleading ===
- Johnsburg
  - 2021–22 S

=== Softball ===
- Marengo
  - 2016–17 3A
