= Grayslake Community High School District 127 =

School district in Illinois, United States

Location
- 400 North Lake Street; Grayslake, Illinois 60030 United States
- Coordinates: 42°20′55″N 88°01′40″W

District information
- Type: Public
- Grades: 9–12
- Superintendent: Dr. Mikkel Storaasli
- Asst. superintendent(s): Mike Zelek and Renee Zoladz
- Schools: 2
- Budget: US$55 Million(2012)
- NCES District ID: 1717550

Students and staff
- Students: 1790 (2016)
- Teachers: 199 (2013)
- Student–teacher ratio: 14.62 (2012)
- Athletic conference: Northern Lake County Conference

Other information
- Website: www.d127.org

Grayslake Community High School District 127 is a public high school district, with two schools: Grayslake Central High School and Grayslake North High School, located in Grayslake, Illinois. The district's enrollment is 2,970.
