= Achim Moeller =

German-American art dealer and art historian (born 1942)

Achim Moeller (born July 21, 1942) is a German-American art dealer, adviser, art historian, scholar and curator. He is the founder and head of Moeller Fine Art and the Achim Moeller Art Advisory.

== Biography ==
=== Personal ===
Moeller was born on July 21, 1942, in Heidelberg. In the mid-1960s he was associated with Kunsthaus Lempertz, and thereafter with Wildenstein and Co., New York. He then served as Director and Vice President of the Marlborough-Gerson gallery in New York until 1971. Moeller was then briefly associated with Roman Norbert Ketterer in Campione d’Italia, Italy. He opened his own gallery in London in 1972, and became a member of the Society of London Art Dealers in 1977. In 1984, he moved the gallery to New York, and is currently a member of the Art Dealers Association of America (ADAA) and the Syndicat National des Antiquaires (SNA), France. In 2014, Moeller announced the launch of the Moeller Art Advisory and Curatorial Service, which provides independent advice to present and future clients in their art collecting. At the same time, Moeller Fine Art Berlin merged with Moeller Fine Art New York, and the Berlin premises closed at the end of June.

=== Career ===
Moeller has been an art dealer, curator, agent, adviser, scholar and appraiser since 1965. For the past 45 years, he has specialized in late 19th and 20th century European and American Masters, and has made Moeller Fine Art the foremost gallery in the United States for works by German Expressionists and the Masters of the Bauhaus. He has sold major works by Max Beckmann, Ernst Ludwig Kirchner, Erich Heckel, Max Pechstein, Karl Schmidt-Rottluff, Otto Mueller, Franz Marc, August Macke, Alexej von Jawlensky, Wassily Kandinsky, Paul Klee, Lyonel Feininger, among others to institutions including the Art Institute of Chicago, the Folkwang Museum, Essen, the Solomon R. Guggenheim Museum, New York, the Museum Ludwig, Cologne, the Metropolitan Museum of Art, New York, the National Gallery of Art, Washington, D.C., the National Gallery of Canada, Ottawa, the Tate Gallery, London and the Philadelphia Museum of Art. Museums and collectors in the United States and Europe frequently consult Moeller to obtain appraisals for works in their collections for exhibition, insurance, and estate purposes.

Moeller is a scholar and the internationally recognized authority on the life and work of Lyonel Feininger (1871–1956) and Mark Tobey (1890–1976). He is currently preparing the Catalogue Raisonné of Paintings by Lyonel Feininger, scheduled for publication in 2016, and founded and maintains the Lyonel Feininger Project and the Mark Tobey Project. For 30 years, Moeller was the curator and sole advisor of the Hon.John C. Whitehead until the latter's death in February 2015 a one-time co-chairman of Goldman Sachs and Deputy Secretary of State (US), whose collection of late 19th and early 20th century French masters has been exhibited in top institutions around the world. Moeller has published numerous exhibition catalogues, most recently "Paul Klee: Early and Late Years, 1894–1940" and "Lyonel Feininger: Drawings and Watercolors from the Julia Feininger Estate," and edited various publications such as "Years of Friendship: The Correspondence of Lyonel Feininger and Mark Tobey." Moeller served as a consultant for the retrospective exhibition "Lyonel Feininger: At the Edge of the World" at the Whitney Museum of American Art, New York, and the Montreal Museum of Fine Arts. Moeller Fine Art regularly exhibits at Art Basel, Art Cologne and the Armory Show. Other recent exhibitions include Howard Wise Gallery: Exploring the New (2013), Crosscurrents in Modern Art (2013–14) and Lyonel Feininger: Master Printmaker (2014).

Moeller is a member of Rotary International, the American Council on Germany, the International Fine Print Dealers Association (IFPDA), the Catalogue Raisonné Scholars Association (CRS), the Honor Committee of Archivio Piero Dorazio, and the Friends of the Busch-Reisinger Museum, Harvard. Former trustee of Lacoste School of the Arts, France, member of advisory committee and trustee of Action against Hunger, USA and Rotary International (Paul Harris Fellow). Assisted Solomon R. Guggenheim Museum with the deaccession and sale of 25 works by Paul Klee. Advisor to Jorge and Sylvie Helft Collection of works by Paul Klee.

His gallery, Moeller Fine Art, is located in New York City.
