= Wauconda High School =

- An aerial view of the WHS campus

Location
- 555 North Main Street; Wauconda, Illinois 60084; United States; 42°16′03″N 88°08′51″W

Information
- Type: Public secondary
- Motto: For the W
- Established: 1915
- School district: Wauconda Community Unit School District #118
- Principal: Jamie Born
- Staff: 90.80 (FTE)
- Grades: 9–12
- Enrollment: 1,480 (2023–2024)
- Student to teacher ratio: 16.30
- Campus: Suburban
- Colors: Purple and Gold
- Athletics conference: Northern Lake County Conference
- Mascot: Bulldogs
- Newspaper: Purple Press
- Yearbook: The Bulldog
- Website: www.d118.org/schools/whs

Wauconda High School, officially Wauconda Community High School, and most commonly WHS, is a public four-year high school located in Wauconda, Illinois, a northern suburb of Chicago, Illinois, in the United States. It is part of Wauconda Community Unit School District 118.

== History ==
Wauconda has been home to a high school dating back to the 1870s, a time when many other Lake County villages did not have high schools. Residents from Ela and Fremont, for instance, paid taxes to transport their high school students to Wauconda for high school. The high school was located in a 3-room building on the corner of Barrington Rd. and Main St. in Wauconda, with both the 8th grade and high school taught in the same room by the same teacher.

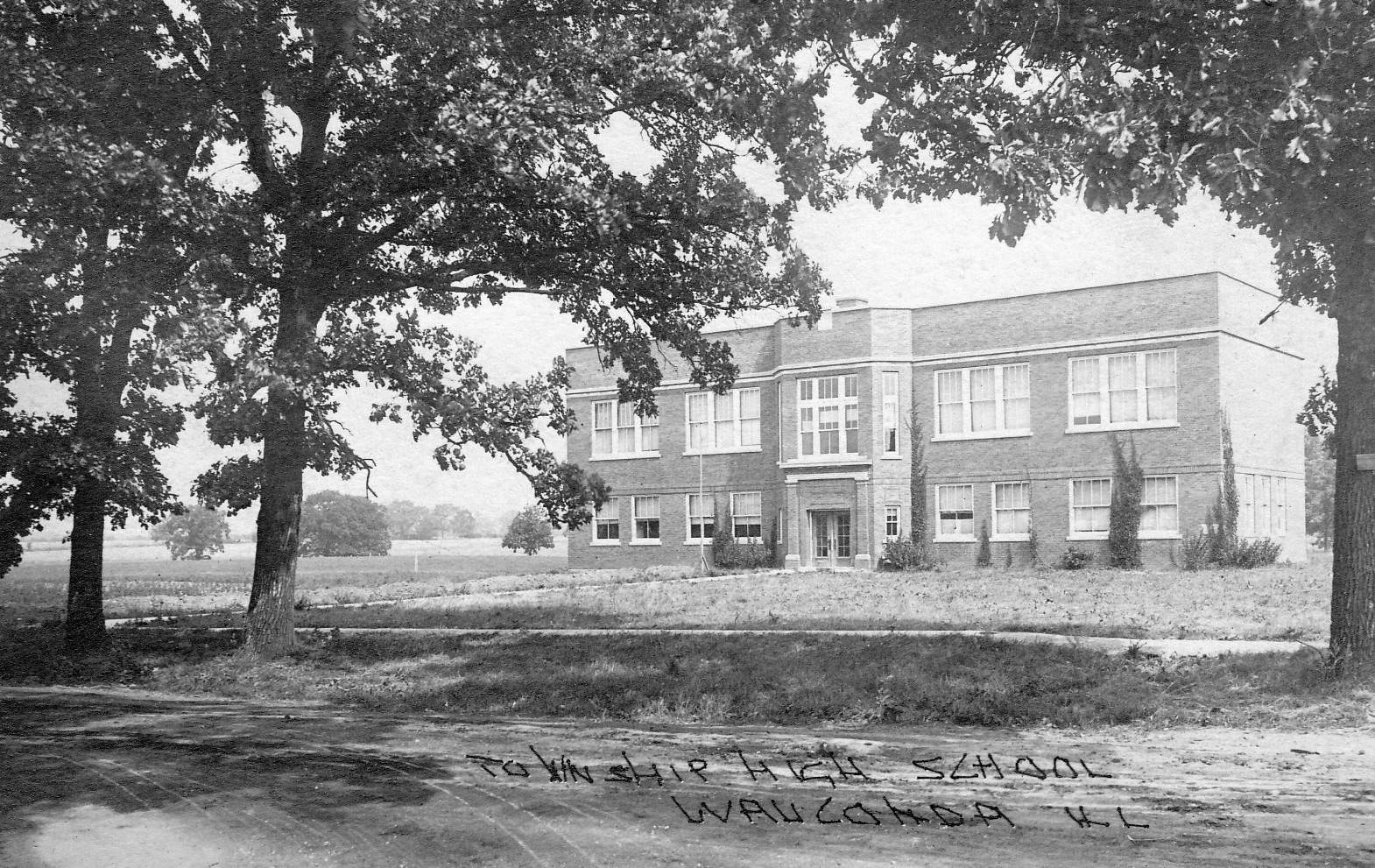
The original Wauconda High School building (middle school today) built in 1916. Prior to that time high school classes were conducted on the second floor of the old village (100 Main Street). This picture was taken in 1918.

On March 15, 1915 the Wauconda Township High School District was established. This date is used as the official founding date for Wauconda High School, as the school celebrated its 100th anniversary in 2015. The school first met on the second floor of the Village Hall located at 100 N. Main St in Wauconda. In May of 1916 the village voted to approve the sale of bonds to finance a dedicated high school building. The new school building was dedicated on December 20, 1916, located at the corner of Slocum Lake Rd. and Osage Rd. - the site of the current Wauconda Middle School.

The current Wauconda High School building first opened its doors in September 1962 to around 600 students, and was hailed as a “Million Dollar Beauty.” The school has been added onto multiple times in the 1970s, increasing the number of classrooms, adding a second gymnasium (now Auxiliary Gym 2), and increasing the size of the cafeteria. The most recent and largest addition to the high school opened in September of 2008. This addition added a dedicated 512 seat auditorium, band and choir rooms, a 2,000 seat competition gymnasium, and the two story classroom wing with 24 new classrooms.

== Campus ==
Wauconda High School has a medium-sized campus. It is divided into wings lettered A-G, an auditorium, 3 gymnasiums (not including the fitness center), a common area for all students, and several courtyards.

There are two cafeterias, the smaller of which is only used by freshmen. The school has a full-time police officer employed, as well as a number of security officers. There is a cafe inside the school, called the Bulldog Brew, which sells items such as snacks, muffins, and most popularly coffee which is operated by student volunteers in yearbook, and is open from 6:50 until 7:20 in the morning, and for a few minutes after the final bell.

There are many outside facilities used for athletic events and gym classes, including two baseball fields, a softball field, a tennis court complex with eight total courts, a track and football field, and a soccer field.

Aerial view showing the track and football field with portions of the baseball field and tennis courts

The school has a 500+ seat auditorium that is home to a band, choir, and theatre program as well as being available for rent. The theatre program has taken several productions to the Illinois High School Theatre Festival. Additionally, the art program at Wauconda High School is recognized as an Illinois Art Education School of Distinction.

== Academics ==
The staff consists of roughly 110 teachers in various subjects and roles (Athletics, Career Tech Education, Creative Arts, English, Foreign Language Mathematics, Social Studies, and Science, Counseling, Social Work, etc.) as well as 20 or so instructional aides and members of the student services department.

== Athletics ==
Wauconda competes in the Northern Lake County Conference and Illinois High School Association. The school's teams compete as the Bulldogs, and its colors are purple and gold. The following sports are offered at Wauconda:

- Baseball (boys)
- Basketball (boys & girls)
- Bowling (boys & girls)
- Competitive cheerleading (girls)
- Competitive dance (girls)
- Cross country (boys & girls)
- Esports (co-ed)
- Fishing (boys & girls)
- Flag Football (girls)
- Football (boys)
- Golf (boys & girls)
- Lacrosse (boys)
- Soccer (boys & girls)
- Softball (girls)
- Tennis (boys & girls)
- Track & field (boys & girls)
- Volleyball (girls)
- Wrestling (boys & girls)

== Alumni ==
- Dr Manhattan, Rock Band
- Grace Lynn Keller (class of 2017), Miss Iowa 2021 and Miss Iowa USA 2023
