= Round Lake High School =

Location
- 800 High School Drive; Round Lake, Lake County, Illinois 60073; United States; 42°21′45″N 88°05′37″W

Information
- Type: Public
- Motto: Pride. Excellence. Respect.
- Established: 1954
- School district: Round Lake Area Schools District 116
- Principal: Brian Peterson
- Staff: 155.00 (FTE)
- Grades: 9–12
- Gender: Co-ed
- Enrollment: 2,226 (2023–2024)
- Student to teacher ratio: 14.36
- Campus: Suburban
- Colors: Navy blue and Maize
- Athletics: Yes
- Athletics conference: IHSA Northern Lake County
- Nickname: Panthers
- Yearbook: The Laker
- Website: School website

Round Lake High School, officially Round Lake Senior High School, and commonly RLHS, is a public four-year high school located in Round Lake, Illinois, a northern suburb of Chicago, in the United States. It is part of Round Lake Area Schools District 116.

== Athletics ==
Round Lake competes in the Northern Lake County Conference. Their nickname is the Panthers. The following IHSA sanctioned sports are offered:

- Allied Bowling (coed)
- Allied Soccer (coed)
- Baseball (boys)
- Basketball (girls & boys)
- Bowling (girls)
- Cross Country (coed)
- Competitive cheerleading (coed)
- Flag Football (girls)
- Football (boys)
- Golf (girls & boys)
- Soccer (girls & boys)
- Softball (girls)
- Tennis (girls & boys)
- Track (girls & boys)
- Volleyball (girls & boys)
- Wrestling (coed)

== Notable alumni ==
- Tim Unroe, Former MLB infielder (Milwaukee Brewers, Anaheim Angels, Atlanta Braves)
- Tom Wittum, all-pro punter for San Francisco
