= Northern Lake County Conference =

Organisation of high schools in Illinois, USA

- Conference: IHSA
- Founded: 2016
- No. of teams: 8
- Region: Chicagoland (Lake County)

Locations of NLCC Schools

The Northern Lake County Conference (NLCC) is an organization of eight high schools in northern Illinois. These high schools are members of the Illinois High School Association.

The conference was established in 2016 with six former members of the North Suburban Conference (Antioch, Grant, Lakes, North Chicago, Round Lake, and Wauconda) and two former members of the Fox Valley Conference (Grayslake Central and Grayslake North). As the name implies, all members of the conference are located in Lake County.

== Membership ==
The conference's current members, as of 2021–22:

School	Town	Team Name	Colors	Enrollment (Note: Starting in the 2019–20 school year, the school enrollments listed by the IHSA are the average of the previous 2 school years and are updated every 2 years.)	IHSA Classes 2/3/4 (Note: The state series class which a school competes in not only depends on the school's student population, but on the sport or activity. Some activities divide schools into two classes, some into three, and others into four. The listing here is in the order of two class, three class, and four class. The more "A"s in a class, the larger the schools competing. For more information on this, see Illinois High School Association#State Series Format.) (Note: Schools are not assigned a classification for football until they have qualified for the playoffs each year. A school's classification not only depends on their student population, but on the populations of the other schools who have qualified. Thus, some schools routinely move between classes.)
Antioch Community High School	Antioch	Sequoits		1335	AA/2A/3A
Grant Community High School	Fox Lake	Bulldogs		1784	AA/3A/4A
Grayslake Central High School	Grayslake	Rams		1347	AA/2A/3A
Grayslake North High School	Grayslake	Knights		1431	AA/2A/3A
Lakes Community High School	Lake Villa	Eagles		1311.5	AA/2A/3A
North Chicago Community High School	North Chicago	Warhawks		742.5	A/2A/3A
Round Lake High School	Round Lake	Panthers		2211.5	AA/3A/4A
Wauconda High School	Wauconda	Bulldogs		1371	AA/2A/3A

== State championships ==
Seven IHSA State Championships have been earned by members of the NLCC.

=== Competitive Cheerleading ===
- Grayslake Central
  - 2018-19 M
- Antioch
  - 2019-20 M

=== Cross Country (boys) ===
- Grayslake Central
  - 2015-16 2A

=== Cross Country (girls) ===
- Grayslake Central
  - 2021-22 2A
  - 2022-23 2A

=== Track & Field (boys) ===
- North Chicago
  - 1985-86 AA

=== Wrestling (boys) ===
- North Chicago
  - 1969-70
