= DuKane Conference =

Athletic conference in Illinois

The DuKane Conference is one of the newest athletic conferences in the Illinois High School Association (IHSA) represented by 6 schools in the central north western portion of Illinois. Officially beginning competition in the 2018–2019 school year the conference has quickly established itself as one of the premier high school athletic leagues in the state of Illinois.

The conference offers championships for girls in basketball, cross country, golf, softball, tennis, track & field, and volleyball. In boys' sports, the DuKane offers championships in baseball, basketball, cross country, football, golf, tennis, track & field, and wrestling.

== History ==
The DuKane Conference was created in 2016 amid a wave of conference realignment across the western suburbs of Chicago. At the time, instability within the DuPage Valley Conference (DVC) and the Upstate Eight Conference (UEC) led several schools to seek a more balanced and geographically practical arrangement.

Eight schools ultimately came together to form the new conference. From the DuPage Valley Conference, Glenbard North, Lake Park, Wheaton North, and Wheaton Warrenville South joined. They were joined by Batavia, Geneva, St. Charles East, and St. Charles North from the Upstate Eight Conference. The name “DuKane” reflects the conference's geographic footprint, combining DuPage County and Kane County, where all member schools are located.

The formation of the DuKane Conference was driven by several key goals: improving competitive balance, reducing travel distances for student-athletes, and creating more consistent scheduling, particularly in football. By aligning schools of similar size and athletic strength, the conference aimed to provide a more equitable and sustainable competitive environment.

School	Team	Mascot
Batavia High School	Batavia	Bulldogs
Geneva High School	Geneva	Vikings
Glenbard North High School	Carol Stream	Panthers
Lake Park High School	Roselle	Lancers
St. Charles East High School	St. Charles	Fighting Saints
St. Charles North High School	St. Charles	North Stars
Wheaton North High School	Wheaton	Falcons
Wheaton Warrenville South High School	Wheaton	Tigers
