= Grayslake Central High School =

Location
- 400 N Lake St; Grayslake, Illinois 60030; United States
- 42°20′55″N 88°01′40″W

Information
- Former name: Grayslake Community High School
- Type: Public secondary
- Motto: We empower all learners to launch their futures through Relevant, Engaging, Authentic Learning.
- Established: 1946
- School district: Grayslake Community High School District 127
- NCES District ID: 1717550
- Authority: Grayslake Community High School District 127
- Superintendent: Mikkel Storaasli
- CEEB code: 142135
- Principal: Daniel Landry
- Teaching staff: 104.00 (FTE)
- Grades: 9–12
- Enrollment: 1,375 (2023–2024)
- Student to teacher ratio: 13.22
- Schedule type: Block Schedule
- Schedule: 8:15 AM – 3:20 PM
- Campus: Suburban
- Campus size: Small
- Colors: Green; White
- Athletics conference: Northern Lake County Conference
- Mascot: Aries the Ram
- Nickname: Rams
- Publication: Inkblots
- Newspaper: Rampage
- Yearbook: The Emerald
- Feeder schools: Park East School, Grayslake Middle School, Fremont Middle School, St. Gilbert Catholic School, Woodland Middle School, Prairie Crossing Charter School
- Website: central.d127.org/o/gchs

Grayslake Central High School (also known as Grayslake Central or GCHS) is a public four-year high school located in Grayslake, Illinois and is part of Grayslake Community High School District 127. Founded in 1946, the school services the Chicago suburbs of Grayslake, Hainesville, and parts of Round Lake. The school's mascot is the Ram. Sender schools include Park School Campus, Grayslake Middle School, Woodland Middle School, Fremont Middle School, Highland Middle School, St. Gilbert Catholic School, and Prairie Crossing Charter School.

== History ==
Grayslake Central High School, originally known as Grayslake Community High School, opened for the first time in 1946 at 400 Lake Street, in downtown Grayslake, Illinois. When the school opened, it was fairly small, consisting of one gymnasium, art studios, culinary art studios, classrooms, and a small cafeteria. In the years following, the campus was expanded to include a smaller auxiliary gymnasium, new district offices combined with an Instructional Media Center, a small theater, more classrooms in the late 90s, woodworking and metalworking facilities, choir and band facilities, a new, larger theater, and a field house. Due to a quickly rising student body resulting in the overcrowding of classes and lunch periods, the school district voted on a number of solutions such as the construction of another addition, or building an entirely separate campus. In the end, the latter was chosen and Grayslake North High School opened as a freshman campus for the 2004–2005 school year and continued as such until the 2007–2008 school year when all students living north of Washington Street relocated to the new campus.

== Administration ==
The school's principal is Daniel J. Landry. The district superintendent is Dr. Mikkel Storaasli.

== Academics ==
=== Accolades ===
D127 was recognized in 2017 as being the 17th best school district in Illinois by Niche, along with the 18th best high school in Illinois by The Washington Post. The school has received Financial Recognition Status by the Illinois State Board of Education for 13 years, this being the highest financial recognition offered by the Illinois State Board of Education. The school is also recognized as a member of the College Board and offers a multitude of Advanced Placement courses. In 2017, the school had 78 AP Scholar Recognitions, 25 AP Scholars with Honor, 90 Scholars with Distinction, and 15 National AP Scholars.

=== Description ===
As of 2022–23 there were 374 seniors, 328 juniors, 354 sophomores, and 363 freshmen.

== Athletics ==
The school offers 53 teams and clubs students can participate in. The school also offers an intramural sports program that culminates in a Staff vs. Student Basketball Game.

Grayslake Central High School Athletics
Fall Sports			Winter Sports			Spring Sports	
Boys	Girls	Co-Ed	Boys	Girls	Co-Ed	Boys	Girls
Cross Country	Cross Country	Cheerleading	Basketball	Basketball	Competitive Cheerleading	Baseball	Soccer
Football	Flag Football	Dance	Bowling	Bowling	Competitive Dance	Lacrosse	Softball
Golf	Golf		Wrestling			Tennis	Track & Field
Soccer	Tennis					Track & Field	
	Volleyball					Volleyball	

=== IHSA Competitive Cheerleading ===
- 2018-19 Medium Division

=== IHSA Cross Country (boys) ===
- 2015-16 2A

=== IHSA Cross Country (girls) ===
- 2021-22 2A
- 2022-23 2A

== Notable alumni ==
- Adolf Benca (1977), painter
- Melinda Bush (1974), member of the Illinois Senate of the 31st district
- Melvin Gordon, professional football player and Super Bowl champion for the Kansas City Chiefs of the National Football League. Gordon attended Grayslake Central for one semester before transferring to Mary D. Bradford High School in Kenosha, Wisconsin
- Jay Hook (1955), former Major League Baseball player for the New York Mets and Cincinnati Reds
- Jo Jorgensen (1975), 2020 presidential nominee for the Libertarian Party.
- Sam Loeffler (1993) and Pete Loeffler (1995), founders of rock band Chevelle
- Tyler Blevins (2009), Twitch streamer, YouTuber, and professional gamer
- Margaret Mary Ray (1970), American woman charged repeatedly with celebrity stalking
