= Illinois Elementary School Association =

Elementary and middle school association

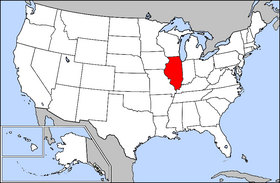
- Abbreviation: IESA
- Legal status: Association
- Purpose: Athletic/Educational
- Headquarters: 1015 Maple Hill Rd.. Bloomington, IL 61705; 40.467311°N 88.950838°W
- Region served: Illinois
- Executive Director: Steve Endsley
- Affiliations: Affiliate member of National Federation of State High School Associations
- Website: http://www.iesa.org/

Illinois Elementary School Association is a statewide athletics and activities association serving elementary and middle schools in the U.S. state of Illinois. At the end of the 1920s, a handful of principals and coaches at several central Illinois grade schools looked at ways to create a means of broadening and unifying their schools' activities programs. At that time, Illinois high schools were represented by the Illinois High School Association, but a comparable association for grade schools did not exist. The association was officially started in April 1928 as the Illinois State Graded School Athletic Association.
