= Woodstock North High School (Illinois) =

Location
- 3000 Raffel Road; Woodstock, Illinois; United States; 42.35073°N 88.42603°W

Information
- Type: High school
- Motto: Going North and Inspiring Others Along the Way
- Established: 2008
- School district: District 200
- Principal: Joshua Segura
- Teaching staff: 64.38 (on an FTE basis)
- Grades: 9-12
- Enrollment: 908 (2023–2024)
- Student to teacher ratio: 14.10
- Campus: Suburban/Exurban
- Colors: Black, teal and silver
- Mascot: Thunderbird
- Nickname: Thunder
- Website: wnhs.woodstockschools.org

Woodstock North High School is a public high school located in Woodstock, Illinois, United States. It is a part of Woodstock Community Unit School District 200. Opened in 2008, it is located twenty minutes south of Wisconsin and one hour northwest of Chicago. It has an enrollment of approximately 950 students.

== Athletics ==
=== IHSA post-season ===
- Dance State Qualifier 2012-2013, 2020-2021, 2021-2022
- Bass Fishing Sectional Champions 2017
- Volleyball Regional Champions 2018
- Boys Basketball Regional Champions 2018-2019
- Boys Track Sectional Champions 2019
- Bass Fishing Sectional Champions 2019
- Girls Softball Regional Champions 2021-2022, 2022-2023

== See also ==
- Woodstock High School (Illinois)
- Woodstock, Illinois
- McHenry County, Illinois
- Marian Central Catholic High School
- Schools in Illinois
