= Grayslake North High School =

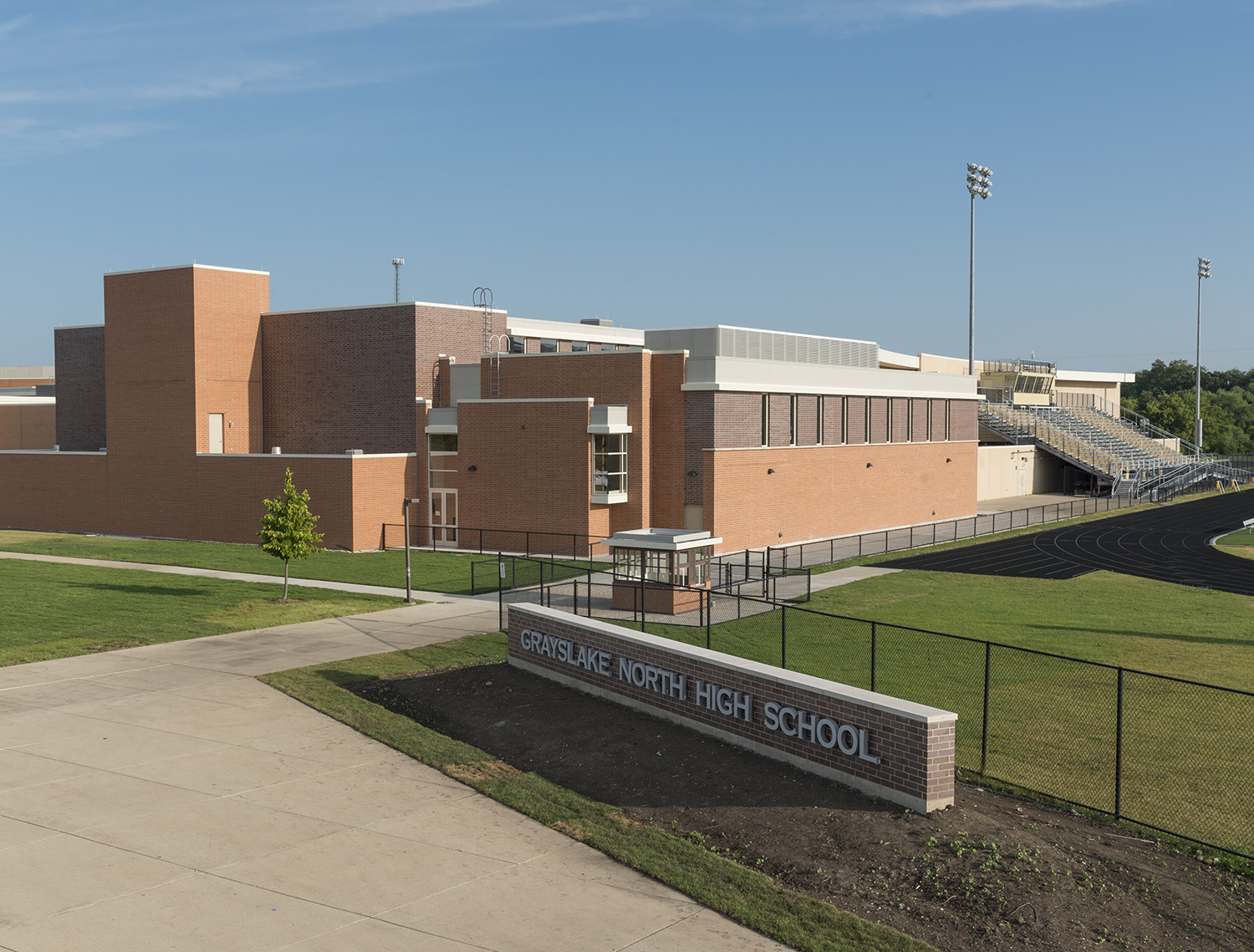

Location
- 1925 North Illinois Route 83; Grayslake, Illinois 60030; United States; 42°22′33″N 88°03′11″W

Information
- Type: Public high school
- Established: 2004
- Principal: Dr. Kari King
- Grades: 9–12
- Enrollment: 1,206 (2023-2024)
- Campus: Suburban
- Colors: Black and Vegas Gold
- Mascot: Nigel the Knight
- Rival: Grayslake Central High School; Lakes Community High School
- Newspaper: Knight Times
- Yearbook: Last Friday Knight 2024
- Website: north.d127.org/o/gnhs

Grayslake North High School is a public high school located in Grayslake, Illinois and is part of Grayslake Community High School District 127. The school's enrollment is 1,530.

== Background ==
The high school was built in 2004 to lower class sizes at Grayslake Community High School (now Grayslake Central High School) on Lake Street. In the school's first year (2004-2005), it housed all of the district's ninth graders (about 700). Since then, it has housed only students north of Washington Street graduating in 2008 or later. The 2007-2008 school year was the first with all four classes represented. This school ended up being the second highest rated high school in the Lake County Area, falling right behind Adlai E. Stevenson High School.

== Athletics ==
The Knights participate in the Northern Lake County Conference.

Athletic teams for girls include tennis, cross country, and volleyball in the fall, basketball, and bowling in the winter, cheerleading and poms in fall through winter, and track and field, soccer, and softball in the spring. Boys' teams include football, soccer, curling, golf, and cross country in the fall, wrestling, bowling, and basketball in the winter, and baseball, lacrosse, tennis, and track and field in the spring.

The boys lacrosse team won the IHSLA Lacrosse Cup for Division B in 2012. As a result, the boys lacrosse team advanced to Division A play in 2013.

The football team qualified for the IHSA state playoffs every season between 2012–13 and 2017-18.

The bass fishing team qualified for IHSA state competition in 2008-09 and 2012-13.

The boys cross country team won their regional title in 2010-11.

The boys golf team won their regional title in 2009-10.

The boys soccer team won their regional title in 2012-13 and in 2014-15.

The competitive cheerleading team has qualified for IHSA state competition every year since serving all four classes in 2007-08.

The pom squad/competitive dance team has also qualified for Illinois state competition nearly every season since 2007-08, though it was not an official IHSA sport until 2012-13.

The softball team won their regional title in 2010-11 and 2011–12 and won their sectional title in 2011-12, qualifying for state competition.

The girls basketball team won their regional title in 2011-12.

The girls bowling team won their regional title in 2013-14 and 2014–15 and qualified for state in 2012-13 and 2014-15.

The girls soccer team won their regional title in 2014-15.

The girls cross country team won their regional title in 2010-2011.

== Other activities ==
2007-2008 was the first year the honors music programs of the North and Central campuses were independent from one another. The school's competitive academic clubs have all enjoyed considerable success at local competitions.

The journalism program finished in 7th place at IHSA state competition in 2011-12 and has six individual medalists at state competition in school history.

== Math Team ==
Grayslake North has made it to the Illinois State Math Team competition nearly every year since 2005 (The first year that Grayslake North has had its own math team).

== Marching Knights ==
Since the school's first year serving grades 9-12, the marching band has been directed by Candace Edstrand and Ryleigh Horner.

=== Show List ===
2007- Hard Rock

2008- Nightmare

2009- Dancing' Down Broadway

2010- Takin' it to the Streets

2011- To Catch a Criminal

2012- Pure Imagination

2013- Sinister

2014- A Tragedy of Temptation

2015- The Anatomy of a Dream

2016- JetSet

2017- Evolution of the Machine

2018- TRAX

2019- It's a Matter of Time

2020- Deconstruction

2021- Superstitious

2022- Nature of the Beast

2023- When Darkness Falls

2024- Dragon

=== Notable competition results ===
2009- Sandwich Musicfest: 1st Place in Class B Parade, 1st Place in Class B Field (Percussion, DM)

2010- Sandwich Musicfest: 1st Place in Class 1A Parade, 1st Place in Class 1A Field (DM, Visual)

2011- Sandwich Musicfest: Grand Champion, 1st Place in Class 2A Parade (Music), 1st Place in Class 2A Field (Visual, Music)

2012- Sandwich Musicfest: 1st Place in Class 3A Parade

2013- Sandwich Musicfest: Grand Champion, 1st Place in Class 3A Field (Music, Visual, Percussion, Auxiliary)

2014- Sandwich Musicfest: 1st Place in Class 3A Field (Music, Visual)

2015- Illinois Marching Band Championships Large Schools: 2nd Place in Class 4A Field

2016- Illinois State University Invitational Marching Championships: 4th Place in Class 3A Field (Crowd Appeal)

2017- Illinois Marching Band Championships Large Schools: 2nd Place in Class 4A Field

2018- Illinois Marching Band Championships Large Schools: 3rd Place in Class 4A Field, Best Visual

2019- Fox River Marching Invitational: 1st Place in Class 4A Field, Best Music Robert Morris University Marching Band Invitational: Grand Champion 1st Place In Class 3A Field, Best Visual, Best General Effect, Best Colorguard Illinois Marching Band Championships Large Schools: 2nd Place in Class 4A Field

2024- Marengo Settlers Days: Class 2A 1st Place (Woodwinds, Marching, Auxiliary, Percussion, DM)

2024- Illinois State Marching Band Championships: Class 2A 3rd Place

2024- Illinois Marching Band Championships Large Schools: Class 4A 3rd Place

2024- WIU Marching Band Classic: Class 4A 2nd Place and best Percussion

== Notable alumni ==
Felicia Stancil — professional BMX athlete and Olympian
