= Grant Community High School =

Location
- 285 East Grand Avenue; Fox Lake, Illinois 60020; United States; 42°23′36″N 88°09′31″W

Information
- School type: Public, high school
- Established: 1930
- School district: 124
- Superintendent: Jeremy Schmidt
- CEEB code: 141945
- Principal: Blair Schoell
- Faculty: 117.80 (FTE)
- Grades: 9-12
- Enrollment: 1,837 (2022–23)
- Student to teacher ratio: 15.59
- Campus type: Suburban
- Colors: Red and white
- Mascot: Bulldogs
- Website: Official website

Grant Community High School is a public high school established in 1930 and located in Fox Lake, Illinois, United States.

== Notable alumni ==
- Daniel Dennis - 2016 Olympic wrestler
- Ryan Noda - baseball player
