= Woodstock High School (Illinois) =

Location
- 501 W. South St. Woodstock, Illinois; United States; 42.3122°N 88.4544°W

Information
- Type: High school
- Motto: "Expect Excellence"
- Established: 1921
- School district: District 200
- Principal: Art Vallicelli
- Teaching staff: 64.12 (on an FTE basis)
- Grades: 9–12
- Enrollment: 1,037 (2023–2024)
- Student to teacher ratio: 16.17
- Colors: Royal blue and white
- Athletics: Kishwaukee River Conference
- Nickname: Blue Streaks
- Website: whs.woodstockschools.org

Woodstock High School is a public high school located in Woodstock, Illinois, a part of Woodstock Community Unit School District 200. Established in 1921, it has an enrollment of approximately 1,050 students. It is ranked 72nd in Illinois and students have the opportunities to take Advanced Placement courses and exams.

== Demographics ==
In 2021–2022 the student body was 53.5% White, 39.1% Hispanic, 3.0% Black, 2.8% Asian/Pacific Islander, and 0.9% multi-racial. 32.5% of the students were eligible for free or reduced-price lunches.

== Athletics ==
=== Football ===
- State Champions: 1983 – Division 4A, 1997 – Division 5A

== Other recognitions ==
- Music Department – second in the state in 2007 and 2008, and third in the state in 2009; second in state 2012; choir first in state; band 8th
- Envirothon – second in state 2005, State Championship 2009

== Notable alumni ==
- Jeff Curran, retired professional mixed martial artist
- Gigi Goode, drag artist, runner up on Season 12 of RuPaul’s Drag Race
- Michael Liedtke American football offensive guard.

== See also ==
- Woodstock North High School
- Woodstock, Illinois
- McHenry County, Illinois
- Marian Central Catholic High School
- Schools in Illinois
