= Johnsburg High School =

Location
- 2002 W. Ringwood Rd. Johnsburg, Illinois 60051; United States; 42°24′12″N 88°14′04″W

Information
- Type: Public high school
- Opened: 1978
- School district: Johnsburg Community Unit School District#12
- Superintendent: Dan Johnson
- Principal: Kevin Shelton
- Teaching staff: 39.00 (on an FTE basis)
- Grades: 9–12
- Enrollment: 474 (2026-2027)
- Student to teacher ratio: 13.59
- Campus: rural
- Colors: Royal blue light gold
- Athletics conference: Kishwaukee River Conference
- Nickname: Skyhawks
- Newspaper: Johnsburg Weekly News
- Yearbook: Skyhawk
- Website: www.johnsburg12.org/o/jhs

Johnsburg High School is a public secondary school in Johnsburg, Illinois; it serves grades 9–12 for the Johnsburg Community Unit School District #12. District 12 serves students in Johnsburg and Ringwood, and small portions of McHenry, Pistakee Highlands, and Spring Grove.

== Community ==
The community experienced a rapid growth, and the high school had 907 students for the 2009–2010 school year. The school continues to see a steady decline in enrollment with an IHSA classification enrollment of just 474 students for the 2026-2027 school year. Enrollment is projected to further decrease due to high property taxes in the area, and the district having a debt burden which is expected to increase significantly and a credit rating that continues to be downgraded.

== Courses of study ==
There is a variety of courses students can take at JHS, including course offerings in art, music, business, foreign languages, as well as a selection of honors and AP classes.

The school also offers vocational classes including graphics, C.A.D., welding, heavy diesel, and machine tool technology. Students who complete the heavy diesel class may also earn a commercial driver's license.

== Athletics ==
Johnsburg is currently a member of the Kishwaukee River Conference, and also participates in state championship tournaments sponsored by the Illinois High School Association (IHSA).

The school currently sponsors interscholastic sports teams for men and women in basketball, cross country, golf, soccer, tennis, and track & field. Men participate in baseball, football, and wrestling. Many women participate in softball and volleyball. Both men and women compete in the school's bass fishing team, the only co-ed IHSA sport.

The 2003 Johnsburg boys basketball team finished 30-2 and historically advanced to the Class AA State Tournament quarterfinals with an enrollment of only 781 students as one of the smallest AA schools in the state. (It was the only area team to ever make the Class AA Boys Basketball State Tournament). In the fall of 2011 Johnsburg sent its first ever girl golfer to the IHSA state meet. Johnsburg received its first state trophy for a team sport in the spring of 2013 when the Lady Skyhawks soccer team took 4th place in IHSA class 1A soccer (They would break this record by securing 3rd-place finish in 2017). Johnsburg football recorded its best performance in its history in 2016 when the program secured a 2nd-place finish at the IHSA Class 4A state title game against Rochester.

== Notable alumni ==
- Sam Saboura, host of ABC's Extreme Makeover
- C. J. Fiedorowicz, professional American football player for the Houston Texans
- Jason and Clay Guida, professional mixed martial arts fighters
- John Smith, college and professional basketball player
