= U.S. Grant Conference =

Illinois high school athletic conference (1927-1974)

The U.S. Grant Conference is a former high school athletic conference with its membership concentrated in the northwestern corner of Illinois. Founded in 1927 and disbanded in 1974, all full conference members were affiliated with the Illinois High School Association.

== History ==
=== 1927-1947 ===
Location of Original U.S. Grant Conference Members

The U.S. Grant Conference was formed in 1927 by eight small high schools in northwestern Illinois: Apple River, East Dubuque, Elizabeth, Galena, Hanover, Scales Mound, Stockton and Warren. All eight members were located in Jo Daviess County, and basketball was the conference's first sponsored sport. Apple River dropped out of the conference in 1930, and the next year, football was added to the conference's competitive offerings. Basketball members Galena, Stockton and Warren were joined by two schools in neighboring Carroll County and Stephenson County: Aquin Catholic in Freeport and Mount Carroll. In 1934, the U.S. Grant Conference added Shullsburg, located just across the state line in Lafayette County, Wisconsin as a sixth member to its football roster. Lanark High School in Carroll County joined the conference's gridiron lineup in 1937, but did not finish the season due to lack of players. Shullsburg dropped out of the conference's football lineup in 1938, and Lanark left the next year when it transitioned to six-player football. In 1944, Hanover replaced Mount Carroll when they started their football program. Aquin Catholic withdrew from the U.S. Grant Conference's football roster and were replaced by East Dubuque the next year. In 1946, Lanark rejoined the conference for football but left along with Hanover before the 1947 season. The two exiting schools were replaced by Pecatonica High School.

=== 1947-1974 ===
Location of Final U.S. Grant Conference Members

Despite the near constant turnover of the U.S. Grant Conference's football ledger, its all-sport membership remained intact for seventeen years, spanning the Great Depression and World War II. That changed for the 1947-48 school year, when Scales Mound left to join the Wisconsin-based Black Hawk League. More changes came for football in 1949, when Pecatonica exited the conference and were replaced by Winslow. St. Columbkille High School in Dubuque, Iowa joined the gridiron fray in 1950, replacing Winslow after a single season of competition. Shullsburg rejoined the conference's football roster in 1953, and Aquin Catholic did the same in 1955. Scales Mound also returned as full members after eight years in the Black Hawk League in 1955. The U.S. Grant held its last football season in 1958 before discontinuing sponsorship of the sport. Outside of football, the conference maintained a steady seven-member all-sport roster from 1955 to 1970. East Dubuque left to compete as an independent that year, bringing the group to six members. In 1971, former Carroll County independents Chadwick and Thomson joined for what would turn out to be the conference's last few seasons. The U.S. Grant Conference disbanded in 1974, with five former members joining the Upstate Illini Conference (Chadwick, Elizabeth, Hanover, Scales Mound and Thomson) and three to the Northwestern Illinois Conference (Galena, Stockton and Warren).

== Conference membership history ==
=== Final full members ===
School	Location	Affiliation	Mascot	Colors	Joined	Left	Conference Joined	Current Conference
Chadwick	Chadwick, IL	Public	Silver Streaks		1971	1974	Upstate Illini	Closed in 1989 (consolidated into Milledgeville)
Elizabeth	Elizabeth, IL	Public	Terrapins		1927	1974	Upstate Illini	Closed in 1985 (merged into River Ridge)
Galena	Galena, IL	Public	Pirates		1927	1974	Northwestern Illinois	Northwest Upstate Illini
Hanover	Hanover, IL	Public	Red Devils		1927	1974	Upstate Illini	Closed in 1985 (merged into River Ridge)
Scales Mound	Scales Mound, IL	Public	Hornets		1927, 1955	1947, 1974	Black Hawk (WIAA), Upstate Illini	Northwest Upstate Illini
Stockton	Stockton, IL	Public	Blackhawks		1927	1974	Northwestern Illinois	Northwest Upstate Illini
Thomson	Thomson, IL	Public	Trojans		1971	1974	Upstate Illini	Closed in 2005 (merged into West Carroll)
Warren	Warren, IL	Public	Warriors		1927	1974	Northwestern Illinois	Northwest Upstate Illini

=== Former full members ===
School	Location	Affiliation	Mascot	Colors	Joined	Left	Conference Joined	Current Conference
Apple River	Apple River, IL	Public	Unknown	Unknown	1927	1930	Independent	Closed in 1940s (consolidated into Warren)
East Dubuque	East Dubuque, IL	Public	Warriors		1927	1970	Independent	Northwest Upstate Illini

=== Former football-only members ===
School	Location	Affiliation	Mascot	Colors	Seasons	Primary Conference
Aquin Catholic	Freeport, IL	Private (Catholic)	Bulldogs		1931-1944, 1955-1958	Rockford Diocesan, SHARK
Lanark	Lanark, IL	Public	Beavers		1937-1938, 1946	Carroll County, Blackhawk, Rock River Valley
Mount Carroll	Mount Carroll, IL	Public	Hawks		1931-1943	Carroll County, Blackhawk, Rock River Valley
Pecatonica	Pecatonica, IL	Public	Indians		1947-1948	Route 72
Shullsburg	Shullsburg, WI	Public	Miners		1934-1937, 1953-1958	Black Hawk (WIAA)
St. Columbkille	Dubuque, IA	Private (Catholic)	Co-Dukes		1950-1958	Northeast Iowa Catholic
Winslow	Winslow, IL	Public	Wildcats		1949	Stephenson County

== List of conference champions ==
=== Boys Basketball ===
School	Quantity	Years
Galena	13	1928, 1930, 1932, 1935, 1936, 1953, 1961, 1967, 1968, 1969, 1971, 1972, 1974
Stockton	10	1931, 1935, 1939, 1940, 1941, 1942, 1943, 1946, 1961, 1973
Elizabeth	9	1949, 1951, 1952, 1954, 1957, 1958, 1960, 1962, 1963
Warren	7	1938, 1945, 1946, 1964, 1965, 1966, 1970
East Dubuque	6	1928, 1947, 1948, 1955, 1956, 1959
Hanover	4	1933, 1934, 1937, 1944
Thomson	1	1972
Apple River	0	
Chadwick	0	
Scales Mound	0	
Champions from 1929 and 1950 unknown

=== Football ===
School	Quantity	Years
Stockton	11	1933, 1936, 1938, 1940, 1943, 1945, 1946, 1947, 1949, 1956, 1957
Galena	6	1939, 1940, 1941, 1942, 1946, 1952
Mount Carroll	4	1932, 1933, 1937, 1939
St. Columbkille	3	1953, 1955, 1958
Warren	3	1934, 1935, 1942
Aquin Catholic	2	1931, 1944
East Dubuque	1	1955
Lanark	1	1946
Hanover	0	
Pecatonica	0	
Shullsburg	0	
Winslow	0	
Champions from 1948, 1950, 1951 and 1954 unknown
