= Northwestern Illinois Conference =

Defunct American high-school athletic conference

- Formerly: Stephenson County Conference; Northwest Conference
- Conference: IHSA
- Founded: 1958
- Folded: 1995
- No. of teams: 11
- Region: Northwest Illinois (Carroll, Jo Daviess, Stephenson, and Winnebago counties)

Locations
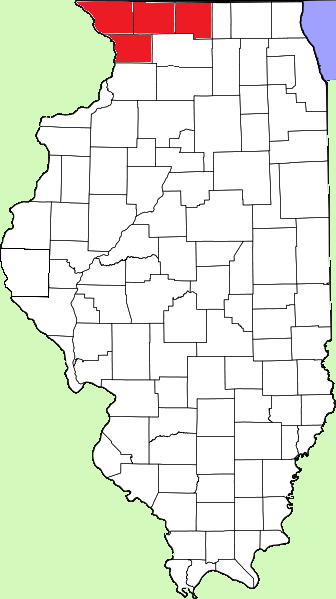
- The Northwestern Illinois Conference within Illinois

The Northwestern Illinois Conference , known locally as the NWIC, was a high school sports conference in northwest and north central Illinois. The conference participated in athletics and activities in the Illinois High School Association. The conference included small public high schools, and one small private school, with enrollments between 75-400 students in Carroll, Jo Daviess, Stephenson and Winnebago counties.

== History ==
Originally known as the Stephenson County Conference, the first year of competition was 1958 with four charter schools: Dakota, Durand, Lena-Winslow and Orangeville. In 1959 Freeport Aquin, Galena, Stockton and Warren joined from the disbanded US Grant Conference. Pearl City joined the conference in 1960 increasing the total number of teams to nine. The last year of competition under the Stephenson County name was 1962.

Based on the fact that the conference contained schools from Jo Daviess, Stephenson and Winnebago Counties, in 1963 it became known as the Northwest Conference. Additionally, in 1966, Lanark, from Carroll County, joined the conference, bringing the total number of schools to 10. In 1974 after Durand, Orangeville and Pearl City left for the Upstate Illini Conference, the remaining schools changed the name to the Northwestern Illinois Conference, also known as the NWIC.

Officially formed in 1974, the 7 members were Dakota, Freeport Aquin, Galena, Lanark, Lena-Winslow, Stockton and Warren. In 1977, Orangeville returned to the fold increasing the total teams to eight. As the 1986 school year began, Lanark High School consolidated with Shannon High School, becoming Eastland High School. After 30 years of membership, in 1988 Warren dropped out of the conference. However, East Dubuque quickly replaced them in 1989, keeping the total number of teams an even eight. Unfortunately, in 1995 they decided to leave the conference. This left the conference in a situation they had not had not been in since 1976, an odd number of teams for which to schedule. The final season for the NWIC occurred in 1995. Beginning in 1996, this conference merged with the Upstate Illini.

Locations of NWIC Schools

== Member schools ==
School	Location	Mascot	Colors	Year Joined	Year Left	IHSA Classes A/AA	IHSA Music Class	IHSA Football Class
Aquin Catholic; High School	Freeport, IL	Bulldogs	Navy Blue, Gold	1959	1996	A	D	1A
Dakota; High School	Dakota, IL	Indians	Maroon, White	1958	1996	A	C	1A
Durand; High School	Durand, IL	Bulldogs	Royal Blue, White	1958	1974	A	C	1A
East Dubuque; High School	East Dubuque, IL	Warriors	Royal Blue, White	1989	1995	A	C	1A
Eastland; High School	Lanark, IL	Cougars	Royal Blue, Orange	1986 consolidated with Shannon High School	1996	A	C	1A
Galena; High School	Galena, IL	Pirates	Royal Blue, White	1959	1996	A	C	1A
Lanark; High School	Lanark, IL	Beavers	Blue, White	1966	1986	A	C	1A
Lena-Winslow; High School	Lena, IL	Panthers	Black, Gold	1958	1996	A	C	1A
Orangeville; High School	Orangeville, IL	Broncos	Purple, Gold	1958; 1977	1974; 1996	A	D	1A
Pearl City; High School	Pearl City, IL	Wolves	Red, White, Black	1960	1974	A	D	1A
Stockton; High School	Stockton, IL	Blackhawks	Maroon, Gold	1959	1996	A	D	1A
Warren; High School	Warren, IL	Warriors	Orange, Black	1959	1988	A	D	1A

Sources:IHSA Conferences, and IHSA Member Schools Directory

=== Membership timeline ===
Full members Various Conferences/Independent US Grant Conference Upstate Illini Conference Northwest 8 Conference

== Competitive Success ==
The Northwestern Illinois Conference won 5 team state championships in IHSA sponsored athletics and activities. The conference also produced 15 individual championships, including track & field, and wrestling.

=== State Champions ===
==== Team ====
School	Sport/Activity	Gender	Year	Class
Stockton	Football	Boys	1978-79	2A
Aquin Central Catholic	Football	Boys	1981-82	1A
Aquin Central Catholic	Football	Boys	1986-87	1A
Orangeville	Football	Boys	1989-90	1A
Stockton	Football	Boys	1991-92	1A

==== Individual ====
Athlete(s)	School	Sport/Activity	Event/Level	Gender	Year	Class
Toni Logemann	Stockton	Track & Field	800m Run	Girls	1994-95	A
Jerry Raab	Stockton	Wrestling	98 lbs	Boys	1975-76	A
Pete Alber	Dakota	Wrestling	98 lbs	Boys	1980-81	A
Jerry Raab	Stockton	Wrestling	105 lbs	Boys	1976-77	A
Mike Lizer	Dakota	Wrestling	105 lbs	Boys	1978-79	A
Tony Alber	Dakota	Wrestling	105 lbs	Boys	1979-80	A
Dennis Lizer	Dakota	Wrestling	112 lbs	Boys	1976-77	A
Steve Webster	Dakota	Wrestling	126 lbs	Boys	1973-74	A
Greg Alber	Dakota	Wrestling	126 lbs	Boys	1987-88	A
Brian Woodley	Dakota	Wrestling	167 lbs	Boys	1993-94	A
Jeff Eastlick	Stockton	Wrestling	185 lbs	Boys	1977-78	A
Andy McPeek	Lena-Winslow	Wrestling	189 lbs	Boys	1992-93	A
Wes Folk	Dakota	Wrestling	189 lbs	Boys	1994-95	A
Dave Eaton	Galena	Track & Field	100m Dash	Boys	1986-87	A
Jeremy Daughenbaugh; Kurt Kramer; Jayson Lietzen; Jeremy Spencer	Lena-Winslow	Track & Field	4x100m Relay	Boys	1992-93	A
