= Northwest 8 Conference =

High school conference in Illinois, USA

- Conference: IHSA
- Founded: 1977
- Folded: 1990
- No. of teams: 8
- Region: Northwest Illinois (Boone, Carroll, DeKalb, Jo Daviess, Lee, Ogle, Stephenson, and Winnebago counties)

Locations
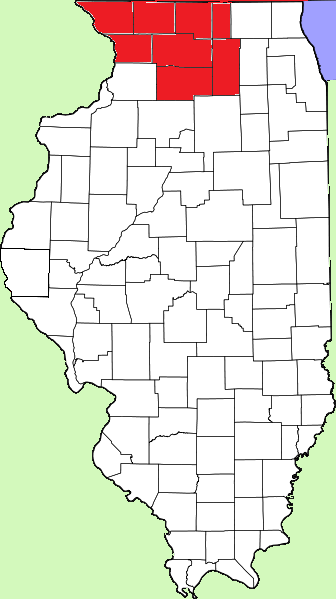
- The Northwest 8 Conference within Illinois

Locations of Northwest 8 Schools

The Northwest 8 Conference was a high school conference in northwest and north central Illinois. The conference participated in athletics and activities in the Illinois High School Association. The conference included small public high schools with enrollments between 75-600 students in Boone, Carroll, DeKalb, Jo Daviess, Lee, Ogle, Stephenson, and Winnebago counties.

== History ==
The conference was composed of teams from the short-lived original Upstate Illini Conference (1974 to 1976). The first year of competition was 1977 with eight charter schools: Ashton, Durand, Franklin Center, Leaf River, Milledgeville, Mt. Carroll, Pearl City and Rockford Lutheran. The primary reason for the creation of the league was football-based. All of the teams from the Upstate Illini with football, except for Orangeville High School, merged into a conference of like sized schools. Prior to the 1982 season Rockford Lutheran left the conference, moving to the Prairie Conference. In 1985, a significant change in structure occurred as Kirkland-Hiawatha left the Trailblazer Conference and joined the Northwest 8, Ashton and Franklin Center began their coop and Leaf River dropped football, leaving the league with 6 teams for football. In 1987, the conference began talks with the Upstate Illini to create a league that would be divided into divisions with equal numbers for all sports, including football. In 1988, North Boone, South Beloit, Warren and River Ridge joined the conference while Rockford Lutheran rejoined. Even though the league was re-branded in 1988, the official final year of competition was 1990 in order to realign football schedules.

Based on the fact that there were originally 8 teams, the conference maintained the name Northwest 8 even when the total number of schools dropped below or increased beyond that total. The league eventually rose to 12 teams and due to the increased number, talks for a re-branding of the Northwest 8 took place in 1987. In 1988, the idea of moving back to the Upstate Illini provided an opportunity to eliminate a conference name that included a number, and competition for all sports, with the exception of football, was established. In 1991, football schedules were set with 6 teams in the North Division: Durand, North Boone, Pearl City, Rockford (Lutheran), Elizabeth (River Ridge)-Warren (coop) and South Beloit and the South Division: Ashton-Franklin Center, Kirkland-Hiawatha, Milledgeville, Mt. Carroll, Mt. Morris and Polo.

== Member schools ==
School	Location	Mascot	Colors	Year Joined	Year Left	IHSA Classes A/AA	IHSA Music Class	IHSA Football Class
Ashton; High School	Ashton, IL	Aces	Green, Gold	1977	1985*	A	-	1A
Ashton- Franklin Center	Ashton, IL	Raiders	Black, Gold, White	1985*	1991	A	-	1A
Durand; High School	Durand, IL	Bulldogs	Royal Blue, White	1977	1991	A	C	1A
Franklin Center; High School	Franklin Grove, IL	Eagles	Maroon, Gold	1977	1985*	A	A	1A
Kirkland-Hiawatha; High School	Kirkland, IL	Hawks	Navy Blue, Gold	1985	1990	A	D	1A
Leaf River; High School	Leaf River, IL	Demons	Royal Blue, White	1977	1990	A	C	1A
Milledgeville; High School	Milledgeville, IL	Missiles	Orange, Black	1977	1991	A	D	1A
Mount Carroll; High School	Mount Carroll, IL	Hawks	Purple, Gold	1977	1991	A	D	1A
Mt. Morris; High School	Mt. Morris, IL	Mounders	Red, Black	1990	1991	A	C	1A
North Boone; High School	Poplar Grove, IL	Vikings	Green, White	1989	1991	A	C	2A
Pearl City; High School	Pearl City, IL	Wolves	Red, White, Black	1977	1991	A	D	1A
Polo Community; High School	Polo, IL	Marcos	Blue, Gold	1990	1991	A	C	1A
River Ridge; High School	Elizabeth, IL**	Wildcats	Navy Blue, Grey	1988	1991	A	D	Coop w/Warren
Rockford Lutheran; High School	Rockford, IL	Crusaders	Purple, White	1977, 1986	1982, 1991	A	C	2A
South Beloit; High School	South Beloit, IL	Sobos	Scarlet Red, White	1989	1991	A	C	1A
Warren; High School	Warren, IL	Warriors	Orange, Black	1988	1991	A	D	1A

* Ashton and Franklin Center began a sports CoOp in 1985, creating a new mascot and school colors.
Sources:IHSA Conferences, IHSA Coop Teams, and IHSA Member Schools Directory

=== Membership timeline ===
Full members Full members (non-football) Full members (Football Coop) Upstate Illini Conference Mid-Northern Conference Other Conference

- River Ridge became a consolidated school district in 1986, combining Elizabeth High School and Hanover High School, both coming from the Upstate Illini Conference
