= Northwest Upstate Illini Conference =

- Conference: IHSA
- Founded: 2001
- No. of teams: 21
- Region: Northwest and North-central Illinois (Carroll, Jo Daviess, Lee, Ogle, Stephenson, Whiteside and Winnebago counties)
- Website: NUIC Football

Locations
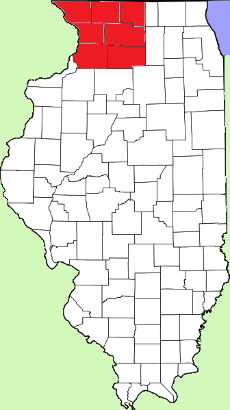
- The Northwest Upstate Illini Conference within Illinois

Locations of NUIC Schools

The Northwest Upstate Illini Conference is a high school conference in northwest and north central Illinois. The conference participates in athletics and activities in the Illinois High School Association. The conference comprises 21 small public high schools with enrollments between 60-340 students in Carroll, Jo Daviess, Lee, Ogle, Stephenson, Whiteside, and Winnebago counties.

== History ==
In 1996 the Northwestern Illinois Conference (NWIC) and Upstate Illini Conference (UIC) merged under the Upstate Illini banner. Initially three divisions were formed for all team sports except football: West - Dakota, East Dubuque, Galena, Lena-Winslow, Orangeville, River Ridge, Stockton, and Warren East - Ashton-Franklin Center, Durand, Kirkland-Hiawatha, North Boone, Pecatonica, Rockford Lutheran and South Beloit, and South - Forreston, Freeport Aquin, Fulton Unity Christian, Eastland, Pearl City, Milledgeville, Mt. Carroll and Polo. In 1999 Savanna was added to the South Division and Rockford Christian Life to the East Division for a total of 24 teams. In 2000, after six schools (Ashton-Franklin Center, Durand, Kirkland-Hiawatha, North Boone, Pecatonica and South Beloit) left to form the Four Rivers Conference, the two remaining schools from the East, Rockford Christian Life and Rockford Lutheran, also left the conference looking for competition within closer proximity.

Based on all of these changes, the remaining schools realigned under the new moniker '"Northwest Upstate Illini"' starting with the 2001 school year. The 18 remaining schools maintained divisional balance in all sports for 4 years, however, during the 2004-05 school year, the school districts of Savanna, Mt. Carroll and Thomson consolidated into the West Carroll School District, becoming the largest high school in the conference. This consolidation reduced the teams in the Northwest Division of football to 6 and also created a scheduling issue due to an odd number of teams within the conference. To correct this, prior to the 2005-06 school year, four schools, Ashton-Franklin Center, Durand, Pecatonica, and South Beloit, joined the conference. These four schools were previously members of the Four Rivers Conference and raised the number of schools from 17 to its highest total of 21. Fulton Unity left the conference to join the Northern Illinois Christian Conference after the 2007 school year, reducing the conference to a total of 20.

South Beloit left the NUIC after the 2015-16 season. The Sobos joined the Northeastern Athletic Conference to compete against schools from Chicago, Rockford, Aurora, Arlington Heights, Elgin, Hebron, Crystal Lake, Ottawa, Mooseheart and Kirkland. To replace the exiting team, the NUIC added Amboy High School, formerly a member of the Three Rivers Conference. The Clippers began competition in the NUIC during the 2016-17 school year.

Between 2019 and 2020, seven teams within the conference announced that they would begin playing 8-man football. This change, as well as several schools cooping, reduced the number of 11-man football teams to nine. In order to maintain competitive balance, Fulton High School joined the NUIC for the 2021-22 school year from the Three Rivers Conference. A member of the Three Rivers Conference since the league's inception in 1975, Fulton made the move to the Northwest Upstate Illini Conference prior to the 2021-22 school year. The addition of Fulton brought the total number of schools back to 21. The Morrison Mustangs joined the NUIC starting in 2024, also leaving the Three Rivers Conference. This addition reunites Fulton and Morrison in the Battle for the Wooden Shoe, a rivalry game that began in 1977 and was halted in 2021 after Fulton left the conference. The addition of Morrison took the total number of schools in the conference to its highest total, 22. However, due to drastic decline in enrollment, Aquin Catholic High School closed in May 2024 reverting the total number of schools back to 21.

== NUIC Sportsmanship Creed ==
Prior to every varsity sporting event, the following creed is read to everyone in attendance.
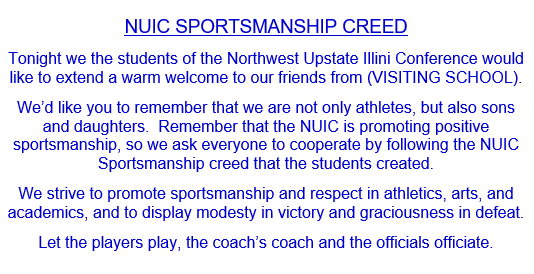

== Current Membership ==
The Northwest Upstate Illini Conference comprises 21 high schools, grades 9-12. There are 21 public high schools within the conference.

School	Location	County	Mascot	Colors	Joined	Enrollment	IHSA Classes 2/3/4	IHSA Music Class	IHSA Football Class	Team Division	Previous Conference
Amboy High School	Amboy, IL	Lee	Clippers	Red, White, Black	2017	216	A/1A/1A (LaMoille Coop- A/1A/2A)	C	8-man	South	Three Rivers
Ashton-Franklin Center; High School	Ashton, IL	Lee	Raiders	Black, Gold, White	2005	163	A/1A/1A	C	8-man	South	Four Rivers
Dakota; High School	Dakota, IL	Stephenson	Indians	Maroon, White	2001	250	A/1A/1A	C	1A	North	Upstate Illini
Durand; High School	Durand, IL	Winnebago	Bulldogs	Royal Blue, White	2005	172	A/1A/1A	C	3A (Coop)	North	Four Rivers
East Dubuque; High School	East Dubuque, IL	Jo Daviess	Warriors	Royal Blue, White	2001	221	A/1A/1A	C	WI (Coop)	West	Upstate Illini
Eastland; High School	Lanark, IL	Carroll	Cougars	Royal Blue, Orange	2001	202	A/1A/1A	C	2A (Coop)	South	Upstate Illini
Forreston; High School	Forreston, IL	Ogle	Cardinals	Red, White, Black	2001	246	A/1A/1A	C	1A	North	Upstate Illini
Fulton; High School	Fulton, IL	Whiteside	Steamers	Red, Black	2021	289	A/1A/2A	C	1A	South	Three Rivers
Galena; High School	Galena, IL	Jo Daviess	Pirates	Royal Blue, White	2001	243	A/1A/1A	C	1A	West	Upstate Illini
Lena-Winslow; High School	Lena, IL	Stephenson	Panthers	Black, Gold	2001	236	A/1A/1A	C	1A	North	Upstate Illini
Milledgeville; High School	Milledgeville, IL	Carroll	Missiles	Orange, Black	2001	160	A/1A/1A	D	8-man	South	Upstate Illini
Morrison; High School	Morrison, IL	Whiteside	Mustangs/ Fillies	Red, White	2024	286	A/1A/1A	C	1A	South	Three Rivers
Orangeville; High School	Orangeville, IL	Stephenson	Broncos	Purple, Gold	2001	102	A/1A/1A	D	8-man	North	Upstate Illini
Pearl City; High School	Pearl City, IL	Stephenson	Wolves	Red, White, Black	2001	135	A/1A/1A	D	2A (Coop)	North	Upstate Illini
Pecatonica; High School	Pecatonica, IL	Winnebago	Indians	Purple, Vegas Gold	2005	256	A/1A/1A	C	3A (Coop)	North	Four Rivers
Polo Community; High School	Polo, IL	Ogle	Marcos	Blue, Gold	2001	160	A/1A/1A	C	8-man	South	Upstate Illini
River Ridge; High School	Hanover, IL	Jo Daviess	Wildcats	Navy Blue, Grey	2001	142	A/1A/1A	D	8-man	West	Upstate Illini
Scales Mound; High School	Scales Mound, IL	Jo Daviess	Hornets	Kelly Green, White	2001	63	A/1A/1A	D	WI (Coop)	West	Upstate Illini
Stockton; High School	Stockton, IL	Jo Daviess	Blackhawks	Maroon, Gold	2001	180	A/1A/1A	D	1A	West	Upstate Illini
Warren; High School	Warren, IL	Jo Daviess	Warriors	Orange, Black	2001	110	A/1A/1A	D	WI (Coop)	West	Upstate Illini
West Carroll; High School	Savanna, IL	Carroll	Thunder	Black, White, Forest Green	2001	340	A/1A/2A	B	2A	West	Upstate Illini

=== Previous members ===
School	Location	County	Mascot	Colors	Joined	Exited	Enrollment	IHSA Classes 2/3/4	IHSA Music Class	IHSA Football Class	New Conference
Aquin Catholic; High School	Freeport, IL	Stephenson	Bulldogs	Navy Blue, Gold	2001	2024	107	A/1A/1A	D	8-man	School Closed
South Beloit; High School	South Beloit, IL	Winnebago	Sobos	Scarlet Red, White	2005	2016	248	A/1A/1A	C	1A	NEAC
Unity Christian; High School	Clinton, IA	Clinton	Knights	Blue & Gray	2001	2007	34	A/1A/1A	D	--	NICC

== Divisions and alignments ==
=== Basketball divisions ===
In 2001, as the conference realigned under its new label, the divisions were broken into 2; nine team divisions.

Those groups were:

- North - Dakota, East Dubuque, Galena, Lena-Winslow, Orangeville, River Ridge, Scales Mound, Stockton, and Warren
- South - Aquin, Eastland, Forreston, Fulton Unity, Milledgeville, Pearl City, Polo, Savanna, Mt. Carroll

Starting in 2005, after the addition of the teams from the Four Rivers Conference and the unification of Savanna, Mt. Carroll and Thomson into West Carroll, the league broke into three divisions for basketball. Each division had 7 teams, however, for girls basketball, River Ridge and Scales Mound formed a coop that would keep the West with only 6 teams.

Those groups were:

- North - Aquin, Dakota, Durand, Orangeville, Pearl City, Pecatonica and South Beloit.
- South - Ashton-Franklin Center, Eastland, Forreston, Fulton Unity, Milledgeville, Polo, and West Carroll.
- West - East Dubuque, Galena, Lena-Winslow, River Ridge, Scales Mound, Stockton, and Warren.

This three division system lasted only for two years when Fulton Unity Christian joined the North Illinois Christian Conference for basketball prior to the start of in 2007-2008 school year. The league realigned back into two divisions with each having 10 teams. These divisions remained constant with the only change occurring in 2016 when Amboy was added to the East to replace South Beloit after their departure.

These groups were:

- East - Amboy, Aquin, Ashton-Franklin Center, Dakota, Durand, Forreston, Milledgeville, Orangeville, Pecatonica, and Polo.
- West - East Dubuque, Eastland, Galena, Lena-Winslow, Pearl City, River Ridge, Scales Mound, Stockton, Warren and West Carroll.

Prior to the 2019-2020 school year, the conference realigned back to three divisions. The divisions would be labeled North, South and West and would be unbalanced with two divisions having 7 teams and one having 6. Fulton joined the conference for the 2021-22 season and were placed in the South Division, giving each division 7 teams. Prior to the 2023-24 season, Orangeville and Aquin boys basketball began a coop, reducing the number of teams in the North to 6.

These divisions were:

- North - Dakota, Durand, Lena-Winslow, Orangeville/Aquin (coop), Pearl City, and Pecatonica
- South - Amboy, Ashton-Franklin Center, Eastland, Forreston, Fulton, Milledgeville, and Polo
- West - East Dubuque, Galena, River Ridge, Scales Mound, Stockton, Warren, and West Carroll

2024 Realignment:

Morrison's entrance into the league and Aquin's departure created an imbalance that required an adjustment in order to maintain equal numbers for each division. In the North, the Orangeville/Aquin coop was eliminated and Forreston was moved from the South to put the total number of teams at 7. The addition of Morrison to the South division kept the total number of teams at 7 with the West being untouched and also keeping 7 teams total.

These divisions are:

- North - Dakota, Durand, Forreston, Lena-Winslow, Orangeville, Pearl City, and Pecatonica
- South - Amboy, Ashton-Franklin Center, Eastland, Fulton, Milledgeville, Morrison, and Polo
- West - East Dubuque, Galena, River Ridge, Scales Mound, Stockton, Warren, and West Carroll

=== Football alignment ===
Initially in 2001, the Northwest Upstate Illini was divided into two football divisions, each having 7 total teams. These divisions were:

- Northwest - Dakota, Eastland-Pearl City (coop), Forreston, Galena, Lena-Winslow, Mt. Carroll and Savanna
- Upstate - Aquin, East Dubuque, Milledgeville, Orangeville, Polo, Warren-River Ridge (coop), and Stockton

In 2005, Mt. Carroll and Savanna consolidated with Thomson to become West Carroll. During the same year, four teams from the Four Rivers Conference (Ashton-Franklin Center, Durand, Pecatonica, South Beloit) were accepted to join the conference. Durand, Pecatonica and South Beloit joined the Northwest Division and Ashton-Franklin Center entered the Upstate. In 2016, upon the departure of South Beloit, Amboy took their position in the Northwest division.

The final alignment of these divisions were:

- Northwest - Amboy-LaMoille-Ohio (coop), Dakota, Durand-Pecatonica (coop), East Dubuque, Eastland-Pearl City (coop), Forreston, Galena, Lena-Winslow, West Carroll
- Upstate - Aquin, Ashton-Franklin Center, Milledgeville, Orangeville, Polo, River Ridge, Stockton, and Warren

Starting in 2019, Polo and River Ridge ceased playing traditional 11-man football and began playing 8-man. This change, along with Warren forming a coop with Black Hawk High School in South Wayne, Wisconsin, has created a conference realignment specifically for football. The conference split geographically into North and South divisions with seven schools on each side. Crossover games between schools in different divisions were scheduled based on enrollment.

These divisions were:

- North Division - Dakota, Durand-Pecatonica (coop), East Dubuque, Galena, Lena-Winslow, Orangeville, Stockton
- South Division - AFC, Amboy-LaMoille-Ohio (coop), Aquin, Eastland-Pearl City (coop), Forreston, Milledgeville, and West Carroll

In 2021, five more teams from the conference transitioned to 8-man football. These teams include Ashton-Franklin Center, and Milledgeville as well as the 1984 (2A) state champion Amboy, the 1989 (1A) state championship team Orangeville, and Freeport Aquin, who claimed the (1A) state championship in 1981, 1986 and 2005. However, with the 2022 addition of Fulton High School, the conference has a net loss of only four teams. These changes will reduce the number of 11-man teams to 10 teams and eliminate the need for divisional play. The 2022 season included:

- 11-Man Football - Dakota, Durand-Pecatonica (coop), East Dubuque, Eastland-Pearl City (coop), Forreston, Fulton, Galena, Lena-Winslow, Stockton and West Carroll
- 8-Man Football - Amboy-LaMoille-Ohio (coop), Ashton-Franklin Center, Aquin, Milledgeville, Orangeville, Polo, and River Ridge

On November 18, 2021, the East Dubuque board of education voted 5 to 1 in favor of joining Southwestern High School (Wisconsin) for football, leaving the NUIC and bringing the total number of teams competing in 11-man football down to nine. This reduction causes each team in the conference the need to seek a non-conference game each season. The 2023 season included the following alignment:

- 11-Man Football - Dakota, Durand-Pecatonica (coop), Eastland-Pearl City (coop), Forreston, Fulton, Galena, Lena-Winslow, Stockton and West Carroll
- 8-Man Football - • North 1 Division: Ashton-Franklin Center •North 2 Division: Amboy-LaMoille-Ohio (coop), Aquin, Milledgeville, Orangeville, Polo, and River Ridge

The 2024 season creates a change in the structure of NUIC football. Regarding 11-man, Morrison joins the league with 2A state championships in 2009 and 2011. The total number of 11-man schools, however, remain at 9 due to the fact that West Carroll converts to 8-man. An additional change in 8-man includes Aquin closing and no longer competing.

The 2024 season included the following alignment:

- 11-Man Football - Dakota, Durand-Pecatonica (coop), Eastland-Pearl City (coop), Forreston, Fulton, Galena, Lena-Winslow, Morrison, and Stockton
- 8-Man Football - • North Division: Amboy-LaMoille-Ohio (coop), Ashton-Franklin Center Milledgeville, Orangeville, Polo, River Ridge, and West Carroll

=== Volleyball alignment ===
In 2001, the conference utilized the same concept of North and South divisions for girls volleyball.

Those groups were:

- North - Dakota, East Dubuque, Eastland, Galena, Lena-Winslow, Orangeville, River Ridge, Scales Mound, Stockton, and Warren
- South - Aquin, Forreston, Fulton Unity, Milledgeville, Mt. Carroll, Pearl City, Polo and Savanna

Similar to basketball, when the league expanded in 2005, some teams shifted and the arrangements moved to the following 3 division system:

- North - Aquin, Dakota, Durand, Orangeville, Pearl City, Pecatonica and South Beloit.
- South - Ashton-Franklin Center, Eastland, Forreston, Fulton Unity, Milledgeville, Polo, and West Carroll.
- West - East Dubuque, Galena, Lena-Winslow, River Ridge, Scales Mound, Stockton, and Warren.

In 2014, the conference eliminated divisions and created a single volleyball conference with all 20 teams and South Beloit was replaced with Amboy after they left the conference in 2016.

Prior to the 2019-2020 school year, the conference realigned back to three divisions. The divisions would once again be labeled North, South and West and would be unbalanced with two divisions having 7 teams and one having 6, however, this alignment changed for the 2021-22 season as Fulton joined the South Division, giving each division 7 teams.

These divisions were:

- North - Aquin, Dakota, Durand, Lena-Winslow, Orangeville, Pearl City, and Pecatonica
- South - Amboy, Ashton-Franklin Center, Eastland, Forreston, Fulton, Milledgeville, and Polo
- West - East Dubuque, Galena, River Ridge, Scales Mound, Stockton, and Warren, and West Carroll

2024 Realignment:

Morrison's entrance into the league and Aquin's departure created an imbalance that required an adjustment in order to maintain equal numbers for each division. In the North, Forreston was moved from the South to put the total number of teams at 7. The addition of Morrison to the South division kept the total number of teams at 7 with the West being untouched and also keeping 7 teams total.

These divisions are:

- North - Dakota, Durand, Forreston, Lena-Winslow, Orangeville, Pearl City, and Pecatonica
- South - Amboy, Ashton-Franklin Center, Eastland, Fulton, Milledgeville, Morrison, and Polo
- West - East Dubuque, Galena, River Ridge, Scales Mound, Stockton, Warren, and West Carroll

== Membership timeline ==
Full members
Full members (Football Coop)
Full members (8-man football)
Full members (Wisconsin Football Coop)
Full members (Basketball Coop)
Partial member (listed sports)
Upstate Illini Conference
Other Conference (Listed)

=== Cooperative Arrangements ===
note: Highlighted school is the host

- Amboy, and Ohio High Schools co-operate for boys basketball. (Co-Op ends 2025)
- Amboy, and Ohio High Schools co-operate for girls basketball. (Co-Op ends 2025)
- Amboy, Ashton-Franklin Center, La Moille and Ohio High Schools co-operate for boys cross country. (Co-Op ends 2025)
- Amboy, Ashton-Franklin Center, La Moille and Ohio High Schools co-operate for girls cross country. (Co-Op ends 2025)
- Amboy, La Moille and Ohio High Schools co-operate for boys football. (Co-Op ends 2025)
- Amboy, Ashton-Franklin Center, La Moille and Ohio High Schools co-operate for boys golf. (Co-Op ends 2025)
- Amboy, Ashton-Franklin Center, La Moille and Ohio High Schools co-operate for girls golf. (Co-Op ends 2025)
- Amboy, Ashton-Franklin Center, La Moille and Ohio High Schools co-operate for boys track & field. (Co-Op ends 2025)
- Amboy, Ashton-Franklin Center, La Moille and Ohio High Schools co-operate for girls track & field. (Co-Op ends 2025)
- Amboy, Ashton Franklin-Center, La Moille and Ohio High Schools co-operate for boys wrestling. (Co-Op ends 2025)
- Amboy, Ashton Franklin-Center, La Moille and Ohio High Schools co-operate for girls wrestling. (Co-Op ends 2025)
- Amboy, and Ohio High Schools co-operate for girls volleyball. (Co-Op ends 2025)
- Ashton (A.-Franklin Center) and Byron co-operate for boys swimming & diving. (Co-Op ends 2025)
- Ashton (A.-Franklin Center) and Byron co-operate for girls swimming & diving. (Co-Op ends 2025)
- Dakota and Orangeville High Schools co-operate for boys wrestling. (Co-Op ends 2025)
- Dakota and Orangeville High Schools co-operate for girls wrestling. (Co-Op ends 2025)
- Durand and Pecatonica High Schools co-operate for boys cross country. (Co-Op ends 2025)
- Durand and Pecatonica High Schools co-operate for girls cross country. (Co-Op ends 2025)
- Durand and Pecatonica High Schools co-operate for football. (Co-Op ends 2025)
- Durand and Pecatonica High Schools co-operate for boys wrestling. (Co-Op ends 2025)
- Durand and Pecatonica High Schools co-operate for girls wrestling. (Co-Op ends 2025)
- East Dubuque and Hanover (River Ridge) High Schools co-operate for boys cross country. (Co-Op ends 2025)
- East Dubuque and Hanover (River Ridge) High Schools co-operate for girls cross country. (Co-Op ends 2025)
- Durand and Pecatonica High Schools co-operate for girls cross country. (Co-Op ends 2025)
- Eastland and Milledgville City High Schools co-operate for boys golf. (Co-Op ends 2025)
- Eastland and Milledgville City High Schools co-operate for girls golf. (Co-Op ends 2025)
- Eastland and Pearl City High Schools co-operate for football. (Co-Op ends 2025)
- Forreston and Polo High Schools co-operate for boys track & field. (Co-Op ends 2025)
- Forreston and Polo High Schools co-operate for girls track & field. (Co-Op ends 2025)
- Forreston and Byron High Schools co-operate for boys swimming & diving. (Co-Op ends 2025)
- Forreston and Byron High Schools co-operate for girls swimming & diving. (Co-Op ends 2025)
- Hanover (River Ridge) and Scales Mound High Schools co-operate for boys baseball. (Co-Op ends 2025)
- Hanover (River Ridge) and Scales Mound High Schools co-operate for boys golf. (Co-Op ends 2025)
- Hanover (River Ridge) and Scales Mound High Schools co-operate for girls golf. (Co-Op ends 2025)
- Hanover (River Ridge) and Scales Mound High Schools co-operate for girls basketball. (Co-Op ends 2025)
- Lena-Winslow and Stockton High Schools co-operate for boys wrestling. (Co-Op ends 2025)
- Lena-Winslow and Stockton High Schools co-operate for girls wrestling. (Co-Op ends 2025)
- Lena-Winslow and Pearl City High Schools co-operate for girls track. (Co-Op ends 2025)
- Morrison and Erie High Schools co-operate for girls swimming and diving. (Co-Op ends 2025)
- Orangeville and Freeport Aquin High Schools co-operate for boys baseball. (Co-Op ends 2025)
- Orangeville and Freeport Aquin High Schools co-operate for girls softball. (Co-Op ends 2025)
- Orangeville and Freeport Aquin High Schools co-operate for boys basketball. (Co-Op ends 2025)
- Pearl City and Lena-Winslow High Schools co-operate for boys golf. (Co-Op ends 2025)
- Pearl City and Lena-Winslow High Schools co-operate for girls golf. (Co-Op ends 2025)
- Pearl City and Eastland High Schools co-operate for Speech Individual Events. (Co-Op ends 2025)
- Pecatonica and Durand High Schools co-operate for boys baseball. (Co-Op ends 2025)
- Pecatonica and Durand High Schools co-operate for boys golf. (Co-Op ends 2025)
- Pecatonica and Durand High Schools co-operate for girls golf. (Co-Op ends 2025)
- Pecatonica, Dakota and Durand High Schools co-operate for boys soccer. (Co-Op ends 2025)
- Pecatonica, Dakota and Durand High Schools co-operate for girls soccer. (Co-Op ends 2025)
- Pecatonica and Byron High Schools co-operate for boys swimming & diving. (Co-Op ends 2025)
- Pecatonica and Byron High Schools co-operate for girls swimming & diving. (Co-Op ends 2025)
- Pecatonica and Durand High Schools co-operate for boys track & field. (Co-Op ends 2025)
- Pecatonica and Durand High Schools co-operate for girls track & field. (Co-Op ends 2025)
- Polo and Byron High Schools co-operate for boys swimming & diving. (Co-Op ends 2025)
- Polo and Byron High Schools co-operate for girls swimming & diving. (Co-Op ends 2025)
- Polo, Forreston, Eastland and Milledgeville High Schools co-operate for boys wrestling. (Co-Op ends 2025)
- Polo, Forreston, Eastland and Milledgeville High Schools co-operate for girls wrestling. (Co-Op ends 2025)
- Scales Mound and River Ridge High Schools co-operate for girls softball. (Co-Op ends 2025)
- Scales Mound High School co-operates with Benton High School (WI) in Benton, Wisconsin, for football, therefore they do not participate in the IHSA football playoffs.
- Stockton, Lena-Winslow, and Warren High Schools co-operate for speech individual events. (Co-Op ends 2025)
- Stockton and Lena-Winslow High Schools co-operate for boys cross country. (Co-Op ends 2025)
- Stockton and Lena-Winslow High Schools co-operate for girls cross country. (Co-Op ends 2025)
- Stockton and Warren High Schools co-operate for boys track and field. (Co-Op ends 2025)
- Stockton and Warren High Schools co-operate for girls track and field. (Co-Op ends 2025)
- Stockton and Warren High Schools co-operate for girls softball. (Co-Op ends 2025)
- Warren and Stockton High Schools co-operate for boys baseball. (Co-Op ends 2023)
- Warren High School co-operates with Black Hawk High School (WI) in South Wayne, Wisconsin, for football, therefore they do not participate in the IHSA football playoffs.

== Competitive Success ==
Teams currently competing in the Northwest Upstate Illini Conference have won 139 team state championships in IHSA sponsored athletics and activities. This includes championships won prior to entering the league. The conference also has produced 147 individual championships, including golf, public speaking, track & field, and wrestling. Josh Alber and Seth Milks from Dakota are the only individual 4-time state champions in the history of the conference. As a wrestler, Alber finished his 4 years of competition undefeated with a final record of 182 wins and 0 losses. Alber also became the first four-time state champion in IHSA history to complete high school competition without a loss or tie.

=== State Champions ===
Note: Championships listed here also include championships won by current member schools prior to any respective consolidations, as well as prior to the formation of the Northwest Upstate Illini Conference.

==== Team ====
School	Sport/Activity	Gender	Year	Class
Polo	8-Man Football	Boys	2019-20	8-Man*
Polo	8-Man Football	Boys	2021-22	8-Man
Amboy	8-Man Football	Boys	2023-24	8-Man
Amboy	8-Man Football	Boys	2024-25	8-Man
Aquin Central Catholic	Basketball	Girls	2011-12	1A
Aquin Central Catholic	Basketball	Girls	2012-13	1A
Eastland	Basketball	Girls	2019-20	1A
Pecatonica	Basketball	Girls	2024-25	1A
Fulton	Football	Boys	1976-77	2A
Stockton	Football	Boys	1978-79	2A
Aquin Central Catholic	Football	Boys	1981-82	1A
Amboy	Football	Boys	1984-85	2A
Aquin Central Catholic	Football	Boys	1986-87	1A
Orangeville	Football	Boys	1989-90	1A
Stockton	Football	Boys	1991-92	1A
Fulton	Football	Boys	1991-92	2A
Galena	Football	Boys	1997-98	1A
Galena	Football	Boys	2003-04	1A
Aquin Central Catholic	Football	Boys	2005-06	1A
Dakota	Football	Boys	2005-06	2A
Dakota	Football	Boys	2007-08	2A
Galena	Football	Boys	2007-08	1A
Morrison	Football	Boys	2009-10	2A
Lena-Winslow	Football	Boys	2010-11	1A
Dakota	Football	Boys	2011-12	1A
Morrison	Football	Boys	2011-12	2A
Lena-Winslow	Football	Boys	2013-14	1A
Forreston	Football	Boys	2014-15	1A
Pearl City (coop w. Eastland)	Football	Boys	2014-15	2A
Forreston	Football	Boys	2016-17	1A
Lena-Winslow	Football	Boys	2017-18	1A
Forreston	Football	Boys	2018-19	1A
Lena-Winslow	Football	Boys	2019-20	1A
Lena-Winslow	Football	Boys	2021-22	1A
Lena-Winslow	Football	Boys	2022-23	1A
Morrison	Softball	Girls	2010-11	2A
Milledgeville	Softball	Girls	2012-13	1A
Eastland	Volleyball	Girls	2008-09	1A
Eastland	Volleyball	Girls	2009-10	1A
Dakota	Volleyball	Girls	2011-12	1A
Eastland	Volleyball	Girls	2015-16	1A
Aquin Central Catholic	Volleyball	Girls	2022-23	1A
Galena	Volleyball	Girls	2023-24	1A
Savanna (now West Carroll)	Wrestling	Boys	1973-74	A
Savanna (now West Carroll)	Wrestling	Boys	1974-75	A
Savanna (now West Carroll)	Wrestling	Boys	1976-77	A
Savanna (now West Carroll)	Wrestling	Boys	1978-79	A
Savanna (now West Carroll)	Wrestling	Boys	1979-80	A
Savanna (now West Carroll)	Wrestling	Boys	1981-82	A
Dakota	Wrestling	Boys	2005-06	A
Dakota	Wrestling	Boys	2012-13	A
Dakota	Wrestling	Boys	2013-14	A
Dakota	Wrestling	Boys	2014-15	A
Dakota	Wrestling	Boys	2015-16	A
Lena-Winslow	Wrestling	Boys	2016-17	A
Lena-Winslow	Wrestling	Boys	2018-19	A
Dakota	Wrestling	Boys	2019-20	A
Leaf River (now Forreston)	Music Sweepstakes	COED	1974-75	D
Leaf River (now Forreston)	Music Sweepstakes	COED	1975-76	D
Elizabeth (now River Ridge)	Music Sweepstakes	COED	1981-82	D
Elizabeth (now River Ridge)	Music Sweepstakes	COED	1982-83	D
Elizabeth (now River Ridge)	Music Sweepstakes	COED	1983-84	D
Elizabeth (now River Ridge)	Music Sweepstakes	COED	1985-86	D
Forreston	Music Sweepstakes	COED	1992-93	C
Milledgeville	Music Sweepstakes	COED	1998-99	C
Forreston	Music Sweepstakes	COED	1999-00	C
Forreston	Music Sweepstakes	COED	2000-01	C
Forreston	Music Sweepstakes	COED	2001-02	C
Forreston	Music Sweepstakes	COED	2002-03	C
Forreston	Music Sweepstakes	COED	2003-04	C
Orangeville	Music Sweepstakes	COED	2003-04	D
Forreston	Music Sweepstakes	COED	2004-05	C
Forreston	Music Sweepstakes	COED	2005-06	C
Orangeville	Music Sweepstakes	COED	2005-06	D
Forreston	Music Sweepstakes	COED	2006-07	C
Orangeville	Music Sweepstakes	COED	2006-07	D
Eastland	Music Sweepstakes	COED	2007-08	C
Orangeville	Music Sweepstakes	COED	2007-08	D
Eastland	Music Sweepstakes	COED	2008-09	C
Orangeville	Music Sweepstakes	COED	2008-09	D
West Carroll	Music Sweepstakes	COED	2009-10	B
Forreston	Music Solo/Ensemble	COED	2009-10	C
West Carroll	Band Solo/Ensemble	COED	2010-11	B
West Carroll	Solo/Ensemble+Organizational	COED	2010-11	B
Forreston	Band Solo/Ensemble	COED	2010-11	C
Forreston	Orchestra Solo/Ensemble	COED	2010-11	C
Forreston	Vocal Solo/Ensemble	COED	2010-11	C
Forreston	Solo/Ensemble+Organizational	COED	2010-11	C
Stockton	Band Solo/Ensemble	COED	2010-11	D
Stockton	Vocal Solo/Ensemble	COED	2010-11	D
West Carroll	Band Solo/Ensemble	COED	2011-12	B
West Carroll	Vocal Solo/Ensemble	COED	2011-12	B
West Carroll	Solo/Ensemble+Organizational	COED	2011-12	B
Forreston	Band Solo/Ensemble	COED	2011-12	C
Forreston	Vocal Solo/Ensemble	COED	2011-12	C
Forreston	Solo/Ensemble+Organizational	COED	2011-12	C
Stockton	Band Solo/Ensemble	COED	2011-12	D
Stockton	Orchestra Solo/Ensemble	COED	2011-12	D
Stockton	Vocal Solo/Ensemble	COED	2011-12	D
Stockton	Solo/Ensemble+Organizational	COED	2011-12	D
West Carroll	Band Solo/Ensemble	COED	2012-13	B
West Carroll	Vocal Solo/Ensemble	COED	2012-13	B
West Carroll	Solo/Ensemble+Organizational	COED	2012-13	B
Forreston	Band Solo/Ensemble	COED	2012-13	C
Forreston	Vocal Solo/Ensemble	COED	2012-13	C
Forreston	Solo/Ensemble+Organizational	COED	2012-13	C
Milledgeville	Vocal Solo/Ensemble	COED	2012-13	D
Stockton	Band Solo/Ensemble	COED	2012-13	D
Stockton	Solo/Ensemble+Organizational	COED	2012-13	D
Forreston	Vocal Solo/Ensemble	COED	2013-14	C
Stockton	Band Solo/Ensemble	COED	2013-14	D
Stockton	Solo/Ensemble+Organizational	COED	2013-14	D
West Carroll	Band Solo/Ensemble	COED	2014-15	B
Forreston	Band Solo/Ensemble	COED	2014-15	C
Stockton	Band Solo/Ensemble	COED	2014-15	C
Stockton	Vocal Solo/Ensemble	COED	2014-15	C
Stockton	Solo/Ensemble+Organizational	COED	2014-15	D
Stockton	Band Solo/Ensemble	COED	2015-16	D
Stockton	Vocal Solo/Ensemble	COED	2015-16	D
Stockton	Solo/Ensemble+Organizational	COED	2015-16	D
West Carroll	Band Solo/Ensemble	COED	2016-17	C
West Carroll	Solo/Ensemble+Organizational	COED	2016-17	C
Stockton	Band Solo/Ensemble	COED	2016-17	D
Stockton	Vocal Solo/Ensemble	COED	2016-17	D
Stockton	Solo/Ensemble+Organizational	COED	2016-17	D
River Ridge	Band Solo/Ensemble	COED	2017-18	D
Stockton	Band Solo/Ensemble	COED	2018-19	D
Stockton	Vocal Solo/Ensemble	COED	2018-19	D
Stockton	Solo/Ensemble+Organizational	COED	2018-19	D
Milledgeville	Vocal Solo/Ensemble	COED	2019-20	D
Milledgeville	Solo/Ensemble+Organizational	COED	2019-20	D
Stockton	Vocal Solo/Ensemble	COED	2020-21	C
Stockton	Solo/Ensemble+Organizational	COED	2020-21	C
Milledgeville	Vocal Solo/Ensemble	COED	2020-21	D
Stockton	Solo/Ensemble+Organizational	COED	2021-22	D
Stockton	Vocal Solo/Ensemble	COED	2022-23	D
Stockton	Solo/Ensemble+Organizational	COED	2022-23	D
River Ridge	Band Solo/Ensemble	COED	2023-24	D
River Ridge	Band Solo/Ensemble+Organizational	COED	2023-24	D

*Polo's championship in 8-man football is in a non-sanctioned IHSA activity.

==== Individual ====
Female Athlete(s)	School	Sport/Activity	Event/Level	Gender	Year	Class
Barb Fogel	Mt. Carroll (now West Carroll)	Track & Field	400m Dash	Girls	1980-81	A
Amy Snyder	Fulton	Track & Field	400m Dash	Girls	1992-93	A
Loni Goeke	Dakota	Track & Field	Discus	Girls	1997-98	A
Loni Goeke	Dakota	Track & Field	Discus	Girls	1998-99	A
Emily Offenheiser	Stockton	Track & Field	Discus	Girls	2017-18	A
Jody Rendon	Stockton	Track & Field	Shot Put	Girls	1998-99	A
Jody Rendon	Stockton	Track & Field	Shot Put	Girls	1999-2000	A
Chloe Lindeman	Fulton	Track & Field	Shot Put	Girls	2017-18	1A
Chloe Lindeman	Fulton	Track & Field	Shot Put	Girls	2018-19	1A
Brittany Houghton	Dakota	Track & Field	Triple Jump	Girls	2005-06	A
Daekota Knott	Fulton	Track & Field	Triple Jump	Girls	2018-19	1A
Abby Redmon	Galena	Track & Field	300m Low Hurdles	Girls	2000-01	A
Rhiannon Coffey	Polo	Track & Field	300m Low Hurdles	Girls	2003-04	A
Toni Logemann	Stockton	Track & Field	800m Run	Girls	1994-95	A
Rachel Knapp	Pecatonica	Track & Field	1600m Run	Girls	1989-90	A
Carmen DeVries	Lena-Winslow	Track & Field	400m Dash	Girls	2017-18	A
Jamie Pickens; Serena Shepard; Amy Snyder; Angie Snyder	Fulton	Track & Field	800m Medley Relay	Girls	1992-93	A
Tammy Adkins; Emily Borchers; Roxi DeVries; Jessica Gagliardi	Forreston	Track & Field	4x400m Relay	Girls	1991-92	A
Danelle Buttel; Marissa Ludewig; Jennifer Mennenga; Mandy Scheffner	Forreston	Track & Field	4x400m Relay	Girls	1994-95	A
Jennifer Birkholz; Danelle Buttel; Marissa Ludewig; Mandy Scheffner	Forreston	Track & Field	4x400m Relay	Girls	1995-96	A
Courtney Kuehl; Chrissy Lehmann; Tammy Schurch; Kelli Wessels	Lena-Winslow	Track & Field	4x400m Relay	Girls	1997-98	A

Male Athlete(s)	School	Sport/Activity	Event/Level	Gender	Year	Class
Dave Melhus	Savanna (now West Carroll)	Wrestling	98 lbs	Boys	1974-75	A
Jerry Raab	Stockton	Wrestling	98 lbs	Boys	1975-76	A
Brad Anderson	Savanna (now West Carroll)	Wrestling	98 lbs	Boys	1979-80	A
Pete Alber	Dakota	Wrestling	98 lbs	Boys	1980-81	A
Dave Seward	Savanna (now West Carroll)	Wrestling	103 lbs	Boys	1961-62	-
Patrick Hamilton	Morrison	Wrestling	103 lbs	Boys	1995-96	A
Seth Milks	Dakota	Wrestling	103 lbs	Boys	2005-06	A
Josh Alber	Dakota	Wrestling	103 lbs	Boys	2010-11	1A
Butch Wingett	Fulton	Wrestling	105 lbs	Boys	1974-75	A
Jerry Raab	Stockton	Wrestling	105 lbs	Boys	1976-77	A
Mike Lizer	Dakota	Wrestling	105 lbs	Boys	1978-79	A
Tony Alber	Dakota	Wrestling	105 lbs	Boys	1979-80	A
Tyler Fleetwood	Fulton	Wrestling	106 lbs	Boys	2015-16	1A
Mark Massery	Savanna (now West Carroll)	Wrestling	112 lbs	Boys	1967-68	-
Dennis Lizer	Dakota	Wrestling	112 lbs	Boys	1976-77	A
Paul Evans	Savanna (now West Carroll)	Wrestling	112 lbs	Boys	1977-78	A
Matt Jacobs	Dakota	Wrestling	112 lbs	Boys	1997-98	A
Seth Milks	Dakota	Wrestling	112 lbs	Boys	2006-07	A
Alec Henze	Dakota	Wrestling	113 lbs	Boys	2014-15	1A
Alec Henze	Dakota	Wrestling	113 lbs	Boys	2015-16	1A
Pat Johnson	Savanna (now West Carroll)	Wrestling	119 lbs	Boys	1976-77	A
Dan Anderson	Savanna (now West Carroll)	Wrestling	119 lbs	Boys	1980-81	A
Randy Stubbe	Dakota	Wrestling	119 lbs	Boys	1997-98	A
Seth Milks	Dakota	Wrestling	119 lbs	Boys	2007-08	A
Mark Massey	Savanna (now West Carroll)	Wrestling	120 lbs	Boys	1968-69	-
Josh Alber	Dakota	Wrestling	120 lbs	Boys	2011-12	1A
Josh Alber	Dakota	Wrestling	120 lbs	Boys	2012-13	1A
Tyler Fleetwood	Fulton	Wrestling	120 lbs	Boys	2016-17	1A
Phoenix Blakely	Dakota	Wrestling	120 lbs	Boys	2019-20	1A
Phoenix Blakely	Dakota	Wrestling	120 lbs	Boys	2021-22	1A
Matt Jacobs	Dakota	Wrestling	125 lbs	Boys	1998-99	A
Cort Lawton	Polo	Wrestling	125 lbs	Boys	2005-06	A
Vince Alber	Dakota	Wrestling	125 lbs	Boys	2006-07	A
Steve Webster	Dakota	Wrestling	126 lbs	Boys	1973-74	A
Dave Melhus	Savanna (now West Carroll)	Wrestling	126 lbs	Boys	1976-77	A
Robert McKnight	Amboy	Wrestling	126 lbs	Boys	1977-78	A
Jack Nickels	Savanna (now West Carroll)	Wrestling	126 lbs	Boys	1978-79	A
Greg Alber	Dakota	Wrestling	126 lbs	Boys	1987-88	A
Printice Walls	Dakota	Wrestling	126 lbs	Boys	2014-15	1A
Ethan Doty	West Carroll	Wrestling	126 lbs	Boys	2018-19	1A
TJ Silva	Dakota	Wrestling	126 lbs	Boys	2022-23	1A
Andy Reeter	Dakota	Wrestling	130 lbs	Boys	1998-99	A
Seth Milks	Dakota	Wrestling	130 lbs	Boys	2008-09	1A
Paul Engaldo	Savanna (now West Carroll)	Wrestling	132 lbs	Boys	1974-75	A
Josh Alber	Dakota	Wrestling	132 lbs	Boys	2013-14	1A
Phoenix Blakely	Dakota	Wrestling	132 lbs	Boys	2022-23	1A
Carver James	Dakota	Wrestling	138 lbs	Boys	2012-13	1A
J.J. Wolfe	Dakota	Wrestling	138 lbs	Boys	2013-14	1A
Nate Olsen	Dakota	Wrestling	138 lbs	Boys	2014-15	1A
Joe Eads	Morrison	Wrestling	138 lbs	Boys	2016-17	1A
Jesse Milks	Dakota	Wrestling	140 lbs	Boys	2005-06	A
Mark McDonnell	Morrison	Wrestling	140 lbs	Boys	2010-11	A
Lonnie Robinson	Savanna (now West Carroll)	Wrestling	145 lbs	Boys	1974-75	A
Dave Lloyd	Ashton (now AFC)	Wrestling	145 lbs	Boys	1981-82	A
Ryan Castro	Savanna (now West Carroll)	Wrestling	145 lbs	Boys	1996-97	A
Darren Olsen	Dakota	Wrestling	145 lbs	Boys	2004-05	A
Mark McDonnell	Morrison	Wrestling	145 lbs	Boys	2011-12	A
Quincy Kalkbrenner	Lena-Winslow	Wrestling	145 lbs	Boys	2012-13	1A
J.J. Wolfe	Dakota	Wrestling	145 lbs	Boys	2014-15	1A
Greg Krulas	Dakota	Wrestling	145 lbs	Boys	2015-16	1A
Carver James	Dakota	Wrestling	152 lbs	Boys	2013-14	1A
Greg Krulas	Dakota	Wrestling	152 lbs	Boys	2014-15	1A
Joe Fosdick	Savanna (now West Carroll)	Wrestling	155 lbs	Boys	1973-74	A
Jim Kurth	Savanna (now West Carroll)	Wrestling	155 lbs	Boys	1981-82	A
Mike Kurth	Savanna (now West Carroll)	Wrestling	155 lbs	Boys	1982-83	A
Matt Wenger	Dakota	Wrestling	160 lbs	Boys	2003-04	A
Caleb Kraft	Dakota	Wrestling	160 lbs	Boys	2006-07	A
Quincy Kalkbrenner	Lena-Winslow	Wrestling	160 lbs	Boys	2013-14	1A
Nathan Olsen	Dakota	Wrestling	160 lbs	Boys	2015-16	1A
Joe Fosdick	Savanna (now West Carroll)	Wrestling	167 lbs	Boys	1975-76	A
Mike Lindeman	Savanna (now West Carroll)	Wrestling	167 lbs	Boys	1979-80	A
Brian Woodley	Dakota	Wrestling	167 lbs	Boys	1993-94	A
Matthew Wenger	Dakota	Wrestling	167 lbs	Boys	2004-05	A
Matthew Wenger	Dakota	Wrestling	167 lbs	Boys	2005-06	A
Carl Bonvillain	Lena-Winslow	Wrestling	167 lbs	Boys	2006-07	A
Trey Griffin	Lena-Winslow	Wrestling	167 lbs	Boys	2009-10	1A
Jake Apple	Dakota	Wrestling	167 lbs	Boys	2010-11	1A
Carver James	Dakota	Wrestling	170 lbs	Boys	2014-15	1A
Andrew Wenzel	Dakota	Wrestling	170 lbs	Boys	2018-19	1A
Eli Larson	Lena-Winslow	Wrestling	175 lbs	Boys	2024-25	1A
Logan Staver	Lena-Winslow	Wrestling	182 lbs	Boys	2012-13	1A
Griffin Luke	Lena-Winslow	Wrestling	182 lbs	Boys	2022-23	1A
Jeff Eastlick	Stockton	Wrestling	185 lbs	Boys	1977-78	A
Chuck Haas	Savanna (now West Carroll)	Wrestling	185 lbs	Boys	1978-79	A
Andy McPeek	Lena-Winslow	Wrestling	189 lbs	Boys	1992-93	A
Wes Folk	Dakota	Wrestling	189 lbs	Boys	1994-95	A
Mitch Alberstett	Durand	Wrestling	189 lbs	Boys	2007-08	A
Mitch Alberstett	Durand	Wrestling	189 lbs	Boys	2008-09	1A
Trey Griffin	Lena-Winslow	Wrestling	189 lbs	Boys	2010-11	1A
Matt McDonnell	Morrison	Wrestling	195 lbs	Boys	2011-12	A
Ty Harmston	Lena-Winslow	Wrestling	195 lbs	Boys	2012-13	1A
Matt Kuebel	Fulton	Wrestling	215 lbs	Boys	1997-98	A
Scott Nicholas	Dakota	Wrestling	215 lbs	Boys	2005-06	A
Ty Harmston	Lena-Winslow	Wrestling	220 lbs	Boys	2013-14	1A
Eli Pannell	Fulton	Wrestling	220 lbs	Boys	2018-19	1A
Noah Wenzel	Dakota	Wrestling	220 lbs	Boys	2022-23	1A
Jake Peterson	Polo	Wrestling	285 lbs	Boys	2009-10	1A
Ian Kuehl	Lena-Winslow	Wrestling	285 lbs	Boys	2017-18	1A
Jamin Soria	Ashton (now AFC)	Wrestling	HWT	Boys	1992-93	A
Jamin Soria	Ashton (now AFC)	Wrestling	275 lbs	Boys	1994-95	A
George Pulford	Savanna (now West Carroll)	Track & Field	880yd Walk	Boys	1896-97	-
Floyd "Bud" Smith	Mt. Carroll (now West Carroll)	Track & Field	High Jump	Boys	1952-53	-
Carl Colby	Pecatonica	Track & Field	Pole Vault	Boys	1900-01	-
Aaron Ruter	Forreston	Track & Field	Discus	Boys	2003-04	A
Steve Brondyke	Fulton	Track & Field	Shot Put	Boys	1977-78	A
Steve Brondyke	Fulton	Track & Field	Shot Put	Boys	1978-79	A
Dave Eaton	Galena	Track & Field	100m Dash	Boys	1986-87	A
Sammy Biggs	Morrison	Track & Field	100m Dash	Boys	2005-06	A
Troy Piper	Durand	Track & Field	400m Dash	Boys	1981-82	A
Gary Medendorp	Fulton	Track & Field	400m Dash	Boys	1982-83	A
Sammy Biggs	Morrison	Track & Field	400m Dash	Boys	2005-06	A
Kevin Glastetter	Milledgeville	Track & Field	400m Dash	Boys	2010-11	1A
Scott Bartelt	Polo	Track & Field	880yd Dash	Boys	1975-76	A
Jerry Funk	Forreston	Track & Field	800m Run	Boys	1984-85	A
Allen Berkstresser	Mt. Carroll (now West Carroll)	Track & Field	1 Mile	Boys	1905-06	-
Jeremy Daughenbaugh; Kurt Kramer; Jayson Lietzen; Jeremy Spencer	Lena-Winslow	Track & Field	4x100m Relay	Boys	1992-93	A
De'Angelo Fernandez; McKeon Crase; Noah Dewey; Michael Taylor	Forreston	Track & Field	4x100m Relay	Boys	2022-23	A
Doug Althaus; Brian Ely; Dennis Ely; Doug Ely	Amboy	Track & Field	4x400m Relay	Boys	1983-84	A
Nick Allen; Keegan Anderson; Koby Brackemeyer; Nathan Mickle	Morrison	Track & Field	4x800m Relay	Boys	2017-18	A
Keegan Anderson; Koby Brackemeyer; Nathan Mickle; Hunter Newman	Morrison	Track & Field	4x800m Relay	Boys	2018-19	A
Mason Wright	Forreston	Track & Field	Triple Jump	Boys	2016-17	1A
Max Milbrath	Pecatonica	Track & Field	Triple Jump	Boys	2022-23	1A
A.J. Christensen	Forreston	Track & Field	110m High Hurdles	Boys	2017-18	1A
A.J. Christensen	Forreston	Track & Field	300m Intermediate Hurdles	Boys	2017-18	1A
Trey Timpe	Stockton	Golf	-	Boys	2013-14	1A

CoEd Athlete(s)	School	Sport/Activity	Event/Level	Gender	Year	Class
Alec Mackenzie	Savanna (now West Carroll)	Individual Events	Extemporaneous Speaking	CoEd	1940-41	-
Alec Mackenzie	Savanna (now West Carroll)	Individual Events	Original Oratory	CoEd	1940-41	-
Stephen Baldridge	Savanna (now West Carroll)	Individual Events	Prose Reading	CoEd	1966-67	-

==== Championship totals ====
School	Team	Individual	Combined
Amboy	3**	2	5
AFC	0	3	3
Aquin	6	0	6
Dakota	10	53	63
Durand	0	3	3
East Dubuque	0	0	0
Eastland	6	0	6
Forreston	27	9	36
Fulton	2	13	15
Galena	4	2	6
Lena-Winslow	8	15	23
Milledgeville	6	1	8
Morrison	3	9	12
Orangeville	6	0	6
Pearl City	1*	0	1
Pecatonica	1	3	4
Polo	2**	4	6
River Ridge	7	0	7
Scales Mound	0	0	0
Stockton	29	8	38
Warren	0	0	0
West Carroll	18	27	45
Totals	139	147	308

*Pearl City was the host school for the football coop with Eastland in the 2014 championship.
**Championships in 8-man football are considered a non-sanctioned IHSA activity.
