= Orangeville High School =

Orangeville High School Orangeville Jr/Sr High School (Orangeville Combined Elementary/High School) Orangeville CUSD #203

Location
- 201 Orange St; Orangeville, Stephenson, Illinois 61060
- Coordinates: 42.46743°N 89.64187°W

Information
- School type: Public Secondary Primary
- Established: 1884
- School district: Orangeville Community Unit School District No. 203
- Superintendent: Jeff Milburn
- Principal: Andrew Janecke
- Teaching staff: 9.75 (on an FTE basis)
- Grades: Pre-K–12
- Gender: Coed
- Enrollment: 96 (2023–2024)
- Student to teacher ratio: 9.85
- Colors: Purple, Gold
- Athletics conference: Northwest Upstate Illini
- Team name: Broncos
- Rival: Le-Win, Aquin, Dakota
- Yearbook: Orano
- Website: OrangevilleCUSD.org

Orangeville High School, now referred to as Orangeville CUSD (Community Unit School District #203), is a public School four year high school that also hosts the Junior High and the elementary school level grades for the entire school district. The building is located at 201 S. Orange St in Orangeville, Illinois, a village in Stephenson County, Illinois. The school serves students residing in the communities of Orangeville, Red Oak, Oneco, Afolkey, Buena Vista, Damascus, Buckhorn Corners, and surrounding area. In 2019, the city’s elementary school was transferred to this building to include all grades within the same complex. The building itself was built to its current state in 1948 after the original building (built in 1884) was destroyed by a fire.

== Orangeville Illinois Community Unit School District ==
The Orangeville school system is its own Illinois School District. Since all grades are now located in the same building, instead of the school being referred to as “Orangeville High School” or “Middle School” or “Elementary School”, it is collectively referred to as Orangeville Illinois CUSD (Community Unit School District) #203 (OCUSD203). OCUSD203 is a public school system located in Orangeville, Illinois at 201 S Orange St. It combines the previous Elementary School into the existing Orangeville High School which already housed the Middle School. This change occurred in 2019. The old elementary school was located at 310 S East St. OCUSD203 has Pre-K programming as well as primary school and secondary school level education classes. In addition to traditional classes, OCUSD offers electives in agriculture, business, music, and Spanish. Juniors & Seniors also have an opportunity to take classes through “CareerTec”. OCUSD203 employs 53 staff members. OCUSD203 offers daily lunches. OCUSD203 in 2021 had 325 students listed. OCUSD203 has a student body consisting of 4% students of color (majority Hispanic), which is much lower than the Illinois public school average of 52% students of color.

OCUSD offers many athletic opportunities, including speech, and several sports teams, including ice hockey, baseball, softball, and high school and junior high football and volleyball, as well as high school and junior high boys' and girls' basketball. Their team is the Broncos. Their colors are purple and gold.

The OCUSD203 district boundaries include all of Stephenson County, Illinois. Nearby school districts include: Lena-Winslow, Illinois, Freeport, Illinois, Dakota, Illinois, and Durand, Illinois.

== Academics ==
Based on the Illinois School Report Card for the 2018-19 school year, Orangeville had a graduation rate of 96%. Additionally, in 2019, Orangeville ranked as the 10,947th best school in the United States, 332nd in Illinois, and 2nd in the Freeport metro area based on U.S. News & World Report.

== Athletics ==
The Broncos compete in the Northwest Upstate Illini Conference. They participate in several IHSA sponsored athletics and activities, including; football, girls volleyball, boys & girls basketball, baseball, softball, and music. Additionally, they Co-Op with Dakota for wrestling, Monroe High School, (Monroe, Wisconsin) for Ice Hockey, and Lena-Winslow High School for Competitive Speech

=== Teams ===
The following teams finished in the top four of their respective IHSA sponsored state championship tournaments:

- Football:
  1A State Champions (1989–90)
- Girls Softball:
  1A Third Place
- Music Sweepstakes:
  Class D State Champions (2003–04)
  2nd Place (2004–05)
  Class D State Champions (2005–06)
  Class D State Champions (2006–07)
  Class D State Champions (2007–08)
  Class D State Champions (2008–09)

=== Individual ===
The following athletes finished the season as state champion:

Athlete(s)	Sport/Activity	Event/Level	Gender	Year	Class
Courtney Kuehl*; Chrissy Lehmann; Tammy Schurch*; Kelli Wessels*	Track & Field	4x400m Relay	Girls	1997-98	A

- *Orangeville students; Kuehl, Schurch and Wessels were running for Lena-Winslow High School during their co-operative season.
