= Galena High School (Illinois) =

Location
- 1206 N Franklin St. Galena, Illinois; United States
- Coordinates: 42.4276°N 90.4406°W

Information
- Type: Public
- School district: Galena Unit School District 120
- Superintendent: Tim Vincent
- Principal: Madeline Hawkins
- Teaching staff: 22.05 (FTE)
- Grades: 9–12
- Enrollment: 230 (2023-2024)
- Student to teacher ratio: 10.88
- Colors: Royal blue, white
- Athletics: Northwest Upstate Illini
- Mascot: Petey the Pirate
- Nickname: Pirates
- Rival: East Dubuque; Le-Win; Stockton
- Yearbook: Ship's Log
- Website: www.gusd120.k12.il.us

Galena High School is the public secondary school in Galena, Illinois, and is part of Galena Unit School District 120. As of 2019, GHS has roughly 240 students. Its current building was built in 1957.

== History ==
The original Galena High School was built in 1861 on Prospect Street and was known as Central High School. In April 1904, Central High School burned to the ground and a new, larger school was built in the same location, opening in 1906. Surrounding communities that may have had rural schools previous to the construction of Central High School were consolidated after the State of Illinois mandated that larger school districts be created in 1949. Opened on September 3, 1957, the new high school immediately brought changes to the curriculum including courses in agriculture and sociology. Outside of the curriculum, the high school building featured a full-size regulation gymnasium along with a modern cafeteria.

== Academics ==
Based on the Illinois School Report Card for the 2018-19 school year, Galena had a graduation rate of 88% and an Advanced Placement participation rate of 43%. Additionally, in 2019, Galena ranked as the 2,745 best school in the United States, and 106 in Illinois based on U.S. News & World Report.

== School song ==
"Old Galena High" (1928)

== Battle cry ==
Galena Pirates we're counting on you
To your colors we'll always be true
Firm and strong united are we
V-I-C-T-O-R-Y
that's the Pirate Battle Cry
Onward to victory
YO-HO!

== Notable alumni ==
- James Wright is the former president of Dartmouth College serving from 1998 to 2009. He is credited with making Dartmouth a more multiracial and multigender campus, hiring more women and minorities to the faculty.
- LaMetta Wynn, the first African American female mayor in Iowa, served as Mayor of Clinton, Iowa from 1995 to 2007.

== Athletics and activities ==
Galena High School competes in the Northwest Upstate Illini Conference and is a member school in the Illinois High School Association. Its teams are known as the Galena Pirates, have the mascot Petey the Pirate, and the colors royal blue and white. The school has 3 state championships on record in team athletics, boys' football in 1997-1998 (1A), 2003-2004 (1A), and 2007-2008 (1A).

=== Football ===
From 1988 to 2003, the football team was coached by Chuck Korte, a former graduate of the school and 8th grade history teacher who retired in 2006. Coach Korte never played high school football as a student, but turned out to be one of the notable coaches in Northwest Illinois: he was inducted into the Illinois Football Coaches Hall of Fame, and the Galena football field is now named for him. The Pirates' rivalries include the East Dubuque Warriors, Le-Win Panthers and Stockton Blackhawks.
