= Benton School District =

Benton School District may refer to:

- Benton School District (Arkansas), based in Benton, Arkansas
- Benton School District (New Hampshire), based in Benton, New Hampshire
- Benton School District (Wisconsin), based in Benton, Wisconsin
- Benton Area School District, based in Benton, Columbia County, Pennsylvania
- Benton Community School Corporation, based in Benton County, Indiana
- Benton Community School District, based in Benton County, Iowa
