= Amboy High School =

Location
- 11 East Hawley Avenue; Amboy, Lee County, Illinois 61310; USA
- Coordinates: 41.7199°N 89.3335°W

Information
- Type: Comprehensive Public High School
- Established: 1949
- School district: Amboy Community Unit School District 272
- Principal: Janet Crownhart
- Teaching staff: 19.25 (FTE)
- Grades: 9–12
- Enrollment: 236 (2023–2024)
- Student to teacher ratio: 12.26
- Colors: Red, White, Black
- Athletics conference: Northwest Upstate Illini Conference
- Nickname: Clippers
- Yearbook: Amboyan
- Feeder schools: Amboy Junior High School
- Website: www.amboy.net/ahs.html

Amboy High School is a public four-year high school located at 11 East Hawley Avenue in Amboy, Illinois, a small city of Lee County, Illinois, in the Midwestern United States. It is part of Amboy Community Unit School District 272, which serves the communities of Amboy, Sublette, Harmon, and Eldena, and includes Amboy Junior High School, and Amboy Central Elementary School. The campus is 12 miles southeast of Dixon, Illinois and serves a mixed small city, village, and rural residential community. The school lies within the Dixon micropolitan statistical area.

== Academics ==
In 2009 Amboy High School made Adequate Yearly Progress, and 69% of students met standards, on the Prairie State Achievement Examination, a state test that is part of the No Child Left Behind Act. The school's average high school graduation rate between 1999 and 2009 was 89%.

== Athletics ==
Amboy High School competes in the Northwest Upstate Illini Conference and is a member school in the Illinois High School Association. Its mascot is the Clippers. The school has 1 state championships on record in team athletics, Boys Football in 1984–1985.

== History ==
The current Amboy High School formed in 1949. The new school district replaced the former Amboy Township High School District. The North Central Association has given formal recognition status since 1924. The current building at Metcalf and Hawley Streets opened for grade 9 through 12 in September 1969, replacing the school building on Appleton Avenue, which now houses Amboy Junior High School.
