= Durand High School (Illinois) =

Location
- 200 West South Street; Durand, Illinois 61024; United States
- Coordinates: 42.4329°N 89.3341°W

Information
- Other name: DHS
- Type: Public high school
- School district: Durand Community Unit School District No. 322
- NCES School ID: 171281001536
- Principal: Michael Leskowich
- Teaching staff: 19.01 (on an FTE basis)
- Grades: 9–12
- Enrollment: 174 (2023-2024)
- Student to teacher ratio: 9.15
- Colors: Royal blue and white
- Athletics conference: Northwest Upstate Illini Conference
- Nickname: Bulldogs
- Website: dhs.durandbulldogs.com

Durand High School (DHS) is a public high school in Durand, Illinois, United States. It is part of the Durand Community Unit School District No. 322, which became a consolidated district in 1949 when the State of Illinois mandated that large school districts be created from small or rural unit districts, therefore, the Elton, Laona and Durand communities were consolidated into Durand's High School.

== Academics ==
Based on the Illinois School Report Card for the 2018–19 school year, Durand had a graduation rate of 100%. Additionally, in 2019, Durand ranked as the 11,611 best school in the United States, 360 in Illinois and 8th in the Rockford metro area based on U.S. News & World Report.

== Athletics ==
The school's athletic nickname is the Bulldogs and compete in the Northwest Upstate Illini Conference. They participate in several Illinois High School Association sponsored athletics and activities, including; football, girls volleyball, boys & girls basketball, boys & girls golf, boys & girls track & field, baseball, softball, bass fishing and music. Due to their small enrollment, Durand coops with neighboring high schools for nine sports (Byron High School for boys & girls swimming & diving and Pecatonica High School for boys football, boys wrestling, boys baseball, boys and girls golf, boys & girls cross country and boys & girls track & field.).
