= Four Rivers Conference (Illinois) =

High school conference in Illinois

- Conference: IHSA
- Founded: 2001
- Folded: 2005
- No. of teams: 6
- Region: North-central Illinois (Boone, DeKalb, Lee and Winnebago counties)

Locations
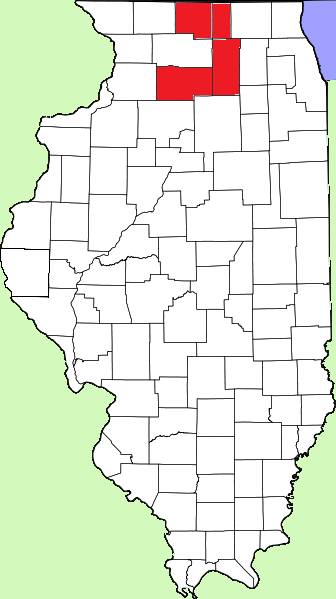
- The Four Rivers Conference within Illinois

Locations of Four Rivers Schools

The Four Rivers Conference was a high school conference in north central Illinois. The conference participated in athletics and activities in the Illinois High School Association. The conference included small public high schools with enrollments between 150-550 students in Boone, DeKalb, Lee and Winnebago counties. The conference was named for the 4 rivers that ran through its geographic area, the Rock River, Pecatonica River, Kishwaukee River and Sugar River.

== History ==
Founded in 2001, the Four Rivers Conference was based primarily on the teams within the East Division of the Upstate Illini Conference. Those teams included: Ashton-Franklin Center, Durand, Kirkland-Hiawatha, North Boone, Pecatonica, Rockford Christian Life, Rockford Lutheran and South Beloit. By 2000, the Upstate Illini had grown to be the second largest conference in the state of Illinois and included 24 teams and 3 divisions, the East as well as the West - Dakota, East Dubuque, Galena, Lena-Winslow, Orangeville, River Ridge, Stockton and Warren and the South - Forreston, Freeport Aquin, Lanark (Eastland), Milledgeville, Mt. Carroll, Pearl City, Polo and Savanna. These divisions were based on geography and not enrollment with the hope of keeping rivalries alive and travel time minimized. Unfortunately, due to football coops as well as enrollment discrepancies, the conference began to have issues regarding football scheduling and opened talks about reorganizing the divisions based on enrollment. During the spring of the 1999-2000 school year, at the annual conference meeting, the issues of realignment created a sticking point that found the administrators of the East Division at odds with the majority of the league. It was at this meeting that 6 of the 8 teams in the East withdrew from the Upstate Illini, establishing the Four Rivers Conference. The remaining 2 schools, Rockford Christian Life and Rockford Lutheran, joined the Private School League in order compete with other non-public schools with similar enrollments. The conference ceased in 2005 with North Boone joining the Big Northern to effectively disband the Four Rivers. The remaining teams joined the Northwest Upstate Illini Conference, while Kirkland-Hiawatha went to the Little Ten Conference.

=== Scheduling ===
Based on the fact that football schedules are set several years in advance, The Four Rivers Conference played a "home-and-home" football schedule with the first meeting being considered non-conference and the second being counted as the conference game. In a 9 game schedule, and only 6 opponents in the league, a team could become conference champions with only 5 wins. All other sports within the conference played traditional schedules with a championship based on the total wins within the league.

== All-Time Membership ==
The list of Four Rivers Conference schools.

School	Location	Mascot	Colors	Year Joined	Year Left	IHSA Classes A/AA	IHSA Music Class	IHSA Football Class	Current NUIC Member
Ashton-Franklin Center; High School	Ashton, IL	Raiders	Black, Gold, White	2001	2005	A	-	1A	Yes
Durand; High School	Durand, IL	Bulldogs	Royal Blue, White	2001	2005	A	C	1A	Yes
Kirkland-Hiawatha; High School	Kirkland, IL	Hawks	Navy Blue, Gold	2001	2005	A	D	1A	No
North Boone; High School	Poplar Grove, IL	Vikings	Green, White	2001	2005	A	C	2A	No
Pecatonica; High School	Pecatonica, IL	Indians	Purple, Vegas Gold	2001	2005	A	C	1A	Yes
South Beloit; High School	South Beloit, IL	Sobos	Scarlet Red, White	2001	2005	A	C	1A	Yes

=== Membership timeline ===
Full members Full members (non-football)
