= Stockton High School =

Stockton High School may refer to:

- Fort Stockton High School, Fort Stockton, Texas
- Linton-Stockton High School, Linton, Indiana
- Stockton High School (California), former school in Stockton Unified School District
- Stockton High School (Illinois), Stockton, Illinois
- Stockton High School (Missouri), Stockton, Missouri
