= Pecatonica =

Pecatonica may refer to:

- Pecatonica, Illinois
- Pecatonica River of Illinois and Wisconsin

== See also ==
- Pecatonica High School (disambiguation)
