= Eastland High School (Illinois) =

Location
- 500 School Drive; Lanark, Illinois 61046; United States; 42°05′48″N 89°49′47″W

Information
- Type: Public High School
- School district: Eastland Community Unit School District 308
- Superintendent: Dr. Alex Kashner
- Principal: Monica Burkholder
- Teaching staff: 25.00 (FTE)
- Grades: 6-12
- Enrollment: 350 (2023–2024)
- Student to teacher ratio: 14.00
- Campus type: Small city
- Colors: Royal blue Orange
- Athletics conference: Northwest Upstate Illini
- Mascot: Cougars
- Website: Eastland High School

Eastland High School, also known as Eastland, or EHS, is a public four-year high school located at 500 School Drive in Lanark, Illinois, a small city in Carroll County, Illinois, in the Midwestern United States. EHS serves the communities and surrounding areas of Lanark, Lake Carroll, Georgetown, and Shannon. The campus is located 25 miles north of Sterling, Illinois, and serves a mixed small city, village, and rural residential community.

== Academics ==
Based on the Illinois School Report Card for the 2018-19 school year, Eastland had a graduation rate of 90% and an Advanced Placement participation rate of 45%. Additionally, in 2019, Eastland ranked as the 4,300 best school in the United States, and 145 in Illinois based on U.S. News & World Report.

== Athletics ==
Eastland High School competes in the Northwest Upstate Illini Conference and is a member school in the Illinois High School Association. Their mascot is the Cougar, with school colors of royal blue and orange. The school has 7 state championships on record in team athletics and activities: back-to-back titles in Girls Volleyball in 2008-2009 and 2009-2010 (1A); Back to back Music Sweepstakes Championships in 2007-2008 and 2008-2009 in Class C Music Sweepstakes. Football in 2014-15 (2A); another for volleyball in 2015-2016 (1a) and its most recent for girls basketball in 2020-2021 (1a)

Due to EHS' small enrollment they coop for several sports: Pearl City High School for Boys Football and Speech Individual Events; Milledgeville High School for Boys and Girls Golf, and Boys and Girls Track and Field.

== History ==
Eastland High School formed after the consolidation of Lanark High School and Shannon High School in 1987. Surrounding communities that may have had high schools previous to Lanark and Shannon were consolidated into those high schools after the State of Illinois mandated that larger school districts be created in 1949. The current school was originally built as Lanark High School and was completed in the winter of 1951 with an addition of four rooms for junior high students being added on prior to the fall of 1957. The mascot for Lanark High School was the Beavers and the school colors were Royal Blue and White. Besides grades 9-12, the current building also houses grades 7 and 8.

As for the former Shannon High School, it also was built in 1951, the mascot was the Eagles and school colors were Orange and Black. The building in Shannon currently houses the district elementary school as well as sixth grade students. After a considerable amount of time was spent trying to create the perfect link between the two schools it was decided that maintaining a color from each school would help keep some history alive for both communities, Orange from Shannon and Royal Blue from Lanark.

The following timeline details the improvements that the district has completed:

- 1998 - Additional classrooms added to the high school
- 2007 - New cafeteria and art classroom are added to the building
- 2010 - A 36,345-square-foot addition was added to the building including a state-of-the-art gymnasium/fitness center/weight room; conversion of the existing weight room/fitness center to an agriculture classroom; upgrading the renovation of an existing classroom to a wood-finishing room; modifications to the existing gymnasium to better support the performing arts; and HVAC improvements.
