= Tom Davis (basketball coach) =

American college men's basketball coach (born 1938)

Biographical details
- Born: December 3, 1938 (age 87); Ridgeway, Wisconsin, U.S.

Playing career
- 1956–1960: Wisconsin–Platteville
- Position: Guard

Coaching career (HC unless noted)
- 1960–1961: Milledgeville HS
- 1961–1966: Portage HS
- 1967–1969: Maryland (assistant)
- 1969–1971: American (assistant)
- 1971–1977: Lafayette
- 1977–1982: Boston College
- 1982–1986: Stanford
- 1986–1999: Iowa
- 2003–2007: Drake

Head coaching record
- Overall: 598–355 (college)
- Tournaments: 18–11 (NCAA Division I); 4–5 (NIT)

Accomplishments and honors

Championships
- 3 ECC regular season (1975–1977); Big East regular season (1981)

Awards
- AP Coach of the Year (1987); Big East Coach of the Year (1981); Big Ten Coach of the Year (1987)

Thomas Robert Davis (born December 3, 1938) is an American former college men's basketball coach. He served as the head coach at Lafayette College, Boston College, Stanford University, the University of Iowa, and Drake University from 1971 to 2007.

== Early life ==
A native of Ridgeway, Wisconsin, Davis attended the University of Wisconsin–Platteville, where he played on the basketball team as a point guard. He was interested in politics, and between his junior and senior years of college, held a congressional internship for Wisconsin US senator Alexander Wiley.

== Coaching career ==
After graduating from UW–Platteville, at the age of 21, Davis took over as head coach at Milledgeville High School in Milledgeville, Illinois for the 1960–61 school year. He attempted to mimic the martinet coaching style of his own college mentor, John Barth, but concluded that "You have to be yourself. What works for someone else isn't going to work for you just because it worked for him."

From 1961 to 1966, Davis was head coach at Portage High School in Portage, Wisconsin. While there, he faced a dilemma in allotting playing time to his players, most of whom he believed were good enough to warrant it. Davis awarded playing time to all deserving players, which gave rise to his philosophy of constantly pressing and rotating players in an effort to wear down the opposing team.

Davis earned a master's degree from the University of Wisconsin–Madison. In 1967, Frank Fellows took over as head coach at the University of Maryland, and hired Davis onto his staff. While serving as an assistant at Maryland, Davis earned his doctorate in history.

=== Lafayette College ===
Davis began his collegiate coaching career at Lafayette College in 1971. During his six-year tenure at the school, he posted a 116–44 record, advancing to the NIT in 1972 and 1975. Future Maryland head coach Gary Williams, who had played as a point guard under Davis at Maryland, served as one of his assistants at Lafayette.

=== Boston College ===
In 1977, Davis became the head coach at Boston College. The Eagles compiled a 100–47 record earning two trips to the NCAA Tournament and a trip to the NIT.

=== Stanford & Iowa ===
He would accept a position at Stanford University before taking over as the head coach at the University of Iowa in 1986. While at Iowa, he led the Hawkeyes to nine NCAA Tournaments, including three Sweet Sixteen appearances as well as an Elite Eight. The Hawkeyes never lost a first round game in the NCAA tournament under Coach Davis. The Hawkeyes also made two NIT appearances.

His team was ranked number one during the 1986–87 season. The Hawkeyes won a school record thirty games before eventually being beaten in the Regional Final of the NCAA Tournament by UNLV 84–81.

On April 2, 1998, after Iowa lost in the first round of the NIT, Davis announced that he would resign after his contract would expire in the following season. Athletic director Bob Bowlsby notified Davis that he would not renew his contract. In Davis's final season, Iowa advanced to the Sweet 16 round of the NCAA tournament for the first time since 1988. He left Iowa as the winningest basketball coach in University of Iowa history.

=== Drake University ===
Davis was named Drake University's 23rd head basketball coach on April 22, 2003. In four short seasons, Davis re-energized a Bulldog program that had not had a winning season since the 1985–86 season. He led Drake to a 17–15 record; including winning the Big Four Series, Drake Regency Challenge, and Sun Bowl Tournament.

=== Retirement ===
On March 21, 2007 Davis announced his retirement from college coaching. His son Keno Davis took over as head basketball coach at Drake University. Davis’ career included sixteen 20-win seasons, eighteen post season appearances, and he was named Associated Press National Coach of the Year in 1987. In 2008, he was inducted into the University of Iowa Athletics Hall of Fame for his success as a coach during his tenure there. He currently lives in the Iowa City area with his wife Shari.

== Head coaching record ==
Record table
| Season | Team | Overall | Conference | Standing | Postseason |
|---|---|---|---|---|---|
Lafayette Leopards (Middle Atlantic Conference) (1971–1974)
| 1971–72 | Lafayette | 21–6 | 7–3 | T–2nd (Western) | NIT second round |
| 1972–73 | Lafayette | 16–10 | 7–3 | 1st (Western) | |
| 1973–74 | Lafayette | 17–9 | 7–3 | T–2nd (Western) | |
Lafayette Leopards (East Coast Conference) (1974–1977)
| 1974–75 | Lafayette | 22–6 | 7–1 | 1st (Western) | NIT first round |
| 1975–76 | Lafayette | 19–7 | 9–1 | 1st (Western) | |
| 1976–77 | Lafayette | 21–6 | 9–1 | 1st (West) | |
| Lafayette: | | 116–44 | 46–12 | | |
Boston College Eagles (NCAA Division I independent) (1977–1979)
| 1977–78 | Boston College | 15–11 | | | |
| 1978–79 | Boston College | 21–9 | | | |
Boston College Eagles (Big East Conference) (1979–1982)
| 1979–80 | Boston College | 19–10 | 2–4 | 5th | NIT second round |
| 1980–81 | Boston College | 23–7 | 10–4 | 1st | NCAA Division I Sweet 16 |
| 1981–82 | Boston College | 22–10 | 8–6 | 4th | NCAA Division I Elite Eight |
| Boston College: | | 100–47 | 20–14 | | |
Stanford Cardinal (Pacific-10 Conference) (1982–1986)
| 1982–83 | Stanford | 14–14 | 6–12 | 8th | |
| 1983–84 | Stanford | 19–12 | 8–10 | T–5th | |
| 1984–85 | Stanford | 11–17 | 3–15 | 10th | |
| 1985–86 | Stanford | 14–16 | 8–10 | T–8th | |
| Stanford: | | 58–59 | 25–47 | | |
Iowa Hawkeyes (Big Ten Conference) (1986–1999)
| 1986–87 | Iowa | 30–5 | 14–4 | 3rd | NCAA Division I Elite Eight |
| 1987–88 | Iowa | 24–10 | 12–6 | 3rd | NCAA Division I Sweet 16 |
| 1988–89 | Iowa | 23–10 | 10–8 | 4th | NCAA Division I Second Round |
| 1989–90 | Iowa | 12–16 | 4–14 | T–8th | |
| 1990–91 | Iowa | 21–11 | 9–9 | T–5th | NCAA Division I Second Round |
| 1991–92 | Iowa | 19–11 | 10–8 | 5th | NCAA Division I Second Round |
| 1992–93 | Iowa | 23–9 | 11–7 | T–3rd | NCAA Division I Second Round |
| 1993–94 | Iowa | 11–16 | 5–13 | T–9th | |
| 1994–95 | Iowa | 21–12 | 9–9 | T–7th | NIT quarterfinal |
| 1995–96 | Iowa | 24–8* | 12–6* | 4th | NCAA Division I Second Round |
| 1996–97 | Iowa | 22–10 | 12–6 | T–2nd | NCAA Division I Second Round |
| 1997–98 | Iowa | 20–11 | 9–7 | T–5th | NIT first round |
| 1998–99 | Iowa | 20–10 | 9–7 | T–3rd | NCAA Division I Sweet 16 |
| Iowa: | | 270–139 | 126–104 | | |
Drake Bulldogs (Missouri Valley Conference) (2003–2007)
| 2003–04 | Drake | 12–16 | 7–11 | T–6th | |
| 2004–05 | Drake | 13–16 | 7–11 | 7th | |
| 2005–06 | Drake | 12–19 | 5–13 | T–7th | |
| 2006–07 | Drake | 17–15 | 6–12 | T–7th | |
| Drake: | | 54–66 | 25–47 | | |
| Total: | | 598–355 | | | |
National champion Postseason invitational champion Conference regular season champion Conference regular season and conference tournament champion Division regular season champion Division regular season and conference tournament champion Conference tournament champion

* Iowa's original 1995–96 record was 23–9 (11–7 Big Ten), but the NCAA awarded Iowa a win by forfeit for the January 3, 1996 game at Purdue, originally an 85–61 loss, due to NCAA violations by Purdue.

== Notable players coached ==
- Michael Adams
- B. J. Armstrong
- John Bagley
- Greg Butler
- Ryan Bowen
- Matt Bullard
- Ricky Davis
- Acie Earl
- Kevin Gamble
- Ed Horton
- Les Jepsen
- Todd Lichti
- Brad Lohaus
- Roy Marble
- Russ Millard
- Chris Street
- Adam Emmenecker
- Dean Oliver
