= Pecatonica High School =

Pecatonica High School may refer to:

- Pecatonica High School (Illinois), Pecatonica, Illinois
- Pecatonica High School (Wisconsin), Blanchardville, Wisconsin
