= Dakota Junior Senior High School =

Location
- 300 Campus Drive; Dakota, Illinois 61018; United States; 42.3866°N 89.5305°W

Information
- School type: Public Secondary
- Established: 1949
- Status: Open
- School district: Dakota Community Unit School District No. 201
- Superintendent: Jenny Keffer
- Teaching staff: 25.57 (on an FTE basis)
- Grades: 7–12
- Gender: Coed
- Enrollment: 343 (2023–2024)
- Student to teacher ratio: 13.41
- Colors: Maroon, white
- Athletics conference: NUIC (North Division)
- Team name: Indians
- Rival: Le-Win, Aquin (Defunct)
- Yearbook: Talebearer
- Website: Dakota201.org

Dakota Junior Senior High School, formerly Dakota High School, is a combined junior-senior high school located in the town of Dakota, Illinois. It is located 10 miles (16 km) northeast of Freeport along Illinois Route 75 in northeast Stephenson County about 25 miles (40 km) northwest of Rockford, is located in the town of Dakota, Illinois. The Dakota Community Unit School District became the third-largest school district in Stephenson County in 1949 when the State of Illinois mandated that larger school districts be created and Davis High School was consolidated into Dakota's High School. Only the districts of Freeport, and Lena-Winslow are larger.

== Facilities ==
Dakota Community Unit School District No. 201 includes students from the villages of Dakota, Davis, Rock City, Rock Grove and Lake Summerset (Stephenson County residents only). Even though the village of Davis has a larger population, because the village of Dakota is the most centrally located community, its name was given to the new union. All students within the CUSD attend Dakota Elementary prior to attending the high school.

== Athletics ==
The Indians compete in the Northwest Upstate Illini Conference. They participate in several IHSA sponsored athletics and activities, including; football, girls' volleyball, boys' and girls' basketball, wrestling, boys' and girls' golf, boys' and girls' track and field, boys' baseball, girls' softball, speech, and music.

=== Athletic achievements ===
==== Teams ====
The following teams finished in the top four of their respective IHSA sponsored state championship tournaments:

- Football:
  2A State Champions (2005–06)
  2A State Champions (2007–08)
  1A State Champions (2011–12)
- Wrestling:
  1A State Champions (2011–12)
  1A State Champions (2005–06)
  1A State Champions (2012–13)
  1A State Champions (2013–14)
  1A State Champions (2014–15)
  1A State Champions (2015–16)
  1A State Champions (2019–20)
