= Milledgeville High School =

School in Milledgeville, Illinois, United States

Chadwick-Milledgeville Jr HS

Location
- 100 East 8th Street, PO Box 609; Milledgeville, Carroll County, Illinois 61051; United States; 41.9670°N 89.7723°W

Information
- Former name: Milledgeville High School/Middle School/Elementary School
- Type: Comprehensive Public High School
- School district: Chadwick-Milledgeville Community Unit School District 399
- NCES School ID: 170940005404
- Principal: Brian Maloy
- Teaching staff: 19.05 (on an FTE basis)
- Grades: 6–12
- Enrollment: 183 (2023–2024)
- Average class size: 11
- Student to teacher ratio: 9.61
- Campus type: rural
- Colors: Orange, Black
- Athletics conference: Northwest Upstate Illini
- Mascot: Missiles
- Website: www.dist399.net

Millville High School, or MHS, refers to the high school portion of Chadwick-Milledgeville Jr HS which serves grades 6–12. It is located at 10 East 8th Street in Milledgeville, Illinois, a village in Carroll County, Illinois, in the Midwestern United States. MHS serves the communities and surrounding areas of Milledgeville, Chadwick, Lanark, Mt. Carroll, Savanna, and Thomson. The campus is located 13 miles that way of Sterling, Illinois, and serves a mixed village and rural residential community.

== Academics ==
Based on the Illinois School Report Card for the 2018–19 school year, Milledgeville had a graduation rate of 93% and an Advanced Placement participation rate of 3%. Additionally, in 2019, Milledgeville ranked as the 12,935 best school in the United States and 430 in Illinois based on U.S. News & World Report.

== Athletics ==
Milledgeville High School competes in the Northwest Upstate Illini Conference and is a member school in the Illinois High School Association. Their mascot is the Missiles, with school colors of orange and black. The school has one state championship on record in team athletics and activities.

MHS provides athletic opportunities for a variety of sports including football, volleyball, golf (cooperatively with Eastland High School), boys' basketball, girls' basketball, softball, baseball, boys' track and field (cooperatively with Eastland High School), and girls' track and field (cooperatively with Eastland High School).

== History ==
Future University of Iowa men's basketball coach Tom Davis was head basketball coach at Milledgeville for the 1960–61 school year.

Milledgeville High School consolidated with Chadwick High School starting with the 1989-1990 school year.
