= Pearl City High School (Illinois) =

Location
- 100 South Summit Street; Pearl City, Illinois 61062; United States; 42.26720°N 89.82900°W

Information
- School type: Public Secondary
- Motto: Inspire in Everyone A Passion to Excel
- Opened: 1912
- School district: Pearl City Community Unit School District No. 200
- Superintendent: Michael Schiffman
- Principal: Michael Schiffman
- Teaching staff: 12.53 (FTE)
- Grades: 9–12
- Gender: Coed
- Enrollment: 132 (2023-24)
- Student to teacher ratio: 10.53
- Campus type: Rural
- Colors: Red, White, Black
- Athletics conference: NUIC (North Division)
- Team name: Wolves
- Rival: Le-Win, Du-Pec
- Newspaper: Howler
- Yearbook: Pearlanna
- Website: https://jrsrhigh.pcwolves.net/

Pearl City High School, is a secondary school located in the town of Pearl City, Illinois. The campus is located 12 miles west of Freeport and 44 miles west of Rockford. It is located just six miles south of U.S. Route 20, a major east–west highway connected to Interstate 90.

== Facilities ==
Pearl City Community Unit School District #200 operates a single school facility serving students from Pre-Kindergarten through twelfth grade. The original building was constructed in 1912 and has undergone numerous renovations and expansions, maintaining its use as an educational institution to this day. An updated high school section, which includes the current gymnasium, was added in 1970. In 2003, a significant addition was made to accommodate both high school and middle school students. This complex also shares space with the Pearl City Park District, featuring three baseball diamonds and recreational fields for physical education, in addition to a football field. The design of the facility emphasizes flexibility, allowing for a variety of school-based and community-based activities.

The school houses a modern library and a fine arts department that encompasses graphic arts, chorus, and band. Academic departments include agriculture, mathematics, science, English, industrial technology, foreign languages, and social sciences. The physical education department is equipped with two gymnasiums, locker rooms, and a weight room.

== Academics ==
Based on the Illinois School Report Card for the 2023-24 school year, Pearl City had a graduation rate of 89%. Additionally, in 2024, Pearl City ranked as the #11,663th best school in the United States, 394th in Illinois, and 3rd in the Freeport metro area based on U.S. News & World Report.

=== Graduation requirements ===
To graduate, the school requires four years of Mathematics, four years of Physical Education, three years of Social Studies, three years of Science, three years of either Music, Art, or Foreign Language, half a year in Health, half a year of Career Exploration & Workplace Skills, half a year of Consumer Education, and one year combined of Microsoft I & II. Additionally, the school requires a minimum of 20 community service hours per year along with a SAT completion.

== Notable achievements ==
The school has received numerous achievements. These include bronze awards from the U.S. News & World Report between 2008 and 2010, second, first, and sixth place on the Rockford Register Star newspaper's Rock River Valley rankings for 2008, 2009, and 2010 respectively, and 55th on the Chicago Times high school rankings of 2010.

== Athletics ==
The Wolves compete in the Northwest Upstate Illini Conference. They participate in several IHSA sponsored athletics and activities, including; football, girls volleyball, boys & girls basketball, boys & girls cross country, boys & girls golf, boys & girls track & field, baseball, softball, bass fishing and music. Due to their small enrollment, Pearl City coops with neighboring high schools for five sports (Lena-Winslow High School for boys & girls golf and girls track & field and Eastland High School for boys football and speech individual events.).

=== Teams ===
The following teams finished in the top four of their respective IHSA sponsored state championship tournaments:

- Music Sweepstakes:
  2nd Place (1985–86)
- Boys Football:
  State Champions (2014–15)
