= River Ridge High School (Illinois) =

Public secondary school in Hanover, Illinois, United States

Location
- 4141 Illinois Route 84 South; Hanover, Illinois 61041; United States; 42.3122°N 90.2709°W

Information
- Type: Comprehensive Public High School
- School district: River Ridge Community Unit School District 210
- Superintendent: Colleen Fox
- Principal: Michael Foltz
- Teaching staff: 14.55 (FTE)
- Grades: 9–12
- Enrollment: 132 (2023-2024)
- Student to teacher ratio: 9.07
- Campus type: Rural
- Colors: Navy; Grey
- Athletics conference: Northwest Upstate Illini
- Mascot: Wildcats
- Yearbook: Excalibur
- Website: River Ridge High School

River Ridge High School, or RRHS, is a public four-year high school located at 4141 Illinois Route 84 South near Hanover, Illinois, a village in Jo Daviess County, Illinois, in the Midwestern United States. RRHS, a part of River Ridge Community Unit School District 210, serves the communities and surrounding areas of Elizabeth and Hanover. The campus is located 27 miles southeast of Dubuque, Iowa, and serves a mixed village and rural residential community.

== Academics ==
River Ridge has competed in the WYSE competition for the past 12 years finishing first in the state WYSE competition in 2012. Based on the Illinois School Report Card for the 2018–19 school year, River Ridge had a graduation rate of 94% and an Advanced Placement participation rate of 10%. Additionally, in 2019, River Ridge ranked as the 6,919 best school in the United States, and 219 in Illinois based on U.S. News & World Report.

== Athletics ==
River Ridge High School competes in the Northwest Upstate Illini Conference and is a member school in the Illinois High School Association. Their mascot is the Wildcats, with school colors of navy blue and grey. The school finished runner-up in the 2011 Girls basketball Class 1A state tournament. In the performing arts, the school was runner up in 2018 and 2024 in the IHSA Music Sweepstakes Competition. In 2025, the Music Department became the IHSA Class D Music Sweepstakes State Champions, the first time since 1986. Due to their small enrollment, RRHS coops with neighboring high schools for several sports (Scales Mound High School for Boys Baseball, Boys Golf, Girls Basketball, and Girls Softball; and Galena and East Dubuque High School for Boys and Girls Track and Field).

== History ==
River Ridge High School formed out of the consolidation of Hanover High School and Elizabeth High School in 1985. Surrounding communities may have possessed high schools at some time which were consolidated into the current RRHS. Potential reference/citation:
