= Eldena, Illinois =

- Unincorporated community
- Location within Illinois Location within the United States
- Coordinates: 41°46′16″N 89°24′36″W
- Country: United States
- State: Illinois
- County: Lee
- Township: South Dixon
- Elevation: 801 ft (244 m)
- Time zone: UTC-6 (Central (CST))
  - Summer (DST): UTC-5 (CDT)
- ZIP code: 61324
- Area codes: 815 & 779
- GNIS feature ID: 407840

Eldena is an unincorporated community in Lee County, Illinois, United States. Its ZIP code is 61324.

== History ==
The community was named after Eldena Van Epp, the wife of an original owner of the town site.
