= Polo Community High School =

Location
- 100 South Union Avenue; Polo, Illinois 61064; United States
- 41°59′09″N 89°34′05″W

Information
- Other name: Polo High School
- Type: Public high school
- School district: Polo Community Unit School District No. 222
- NCES School ID: 173210003360
- Principal: Andy Faivre
- Teaching staff: 15.69 (on an FTE basis)
- Grades: 9–12
- Enrollment: 189 (2023-2024)
- Student to teacher ratio: 12.05
- Colors: Blue and gold
- Athletics conference: Northwest Upstate Illini Conference
- Nickname: Marcos
- Yearbook: Cycle
- Website: home.poloschools.net

Polo Community High School (simply referred to as Polo High School) is a public high school in Polo, Illinois, United States. It is part of the Polo Community Unit School District No. 222.

It was ranked as the 6,869 best school in the United States, 218 in Illinois, and 4th in the Rochelle metro area based on U.S. News & World Report 2019 ranking.

== Athletics ==
The Marcos compete in the Northwest Upstate Illini Conference and participate in several Illinois High School Association (IHSA) sponsored athletics and activities, including; eight-man football, girls volleyball, boys and girls basketball, baseball, softball, cross country, competitive cheer, and music. Additionally, they co-op with Forreston High School for wrestling and boys and girls track and field, and Byron High School for girls and boys swimming and diving.
