= West Carroll High School =

School in Mount Carroll, Illinois, United States

Location
- 633 S East St; Mount Carroll, Carroll County, Illinois 61074; United States; 42.0905°N 89.9692°W

Information
- Type: Comprehensive Public High School
- School district: West Carroll Community Unit School District 314
- Principal: Deb Gunnarsson
- Teaching staff: 19.57 (FTE)
- Grades: 9–12
- Enrollment: 278 (2023–2024)
- Student to teacher ratio: 14.21
- Campus type: Small city
- Colors: Black, White, Hunter Green
- Athletics conference: Northwest Upstate Illini
- Mascot: Thunder
- Website: West Carroll High School

West Carroll High School, or WCHS, is a public four-year high school in Mount Carroll, Carroll County, Illinois. WCHS serves Savanna, Mt. Carroll, Thomson and the surrounding area. The campus is located 20 miles north, north west of Clinton, Iowa. West Carroll High School was formed in 2005 from the consolidation of Mount Carroll High School, Savanna High School, and Thomson High School. The High School was located in Savanna, Il through the 2025 year, and has since relocated to Mount Carroll, Il.

== Extracurricular activities ==
=== Athletics ===
West Carroll High School competes in the Northwest Upstate Illini Conference and is a member school in the Illinois High School Association. Its mascot is the Thunder, with school colors of black, white, and forest green.

Predecessor high school, Savanna High School, won six state championships in boys' wrestling (1973–1974 A, 1974–1975 A, 1976–1977 A, 1978–1979 A, 1979–1980 A, and 1981–1982 A), making the school the third most successful boys' wrestling program in Illinois high school history in terms of championships.

Two years before the opening of West Carroll, Savanna and Mount Carroll began a cooperative sharing program for several sports, including football. Prior to the cooperative, Savanna amassed a 63-game losing streak in football, dating to October 1995; the streak was once the subject of a Sports Illustrated story by columnist Rick Reilly. The West Carroll cooperative football won its first game in 2003 and earned playoff berths in 2005, 2006 and 2007.

In the 2024-2025 year West Carroll realigned to 8-man football.

== Music ==
The school has won five state championships in music: 2009–2010, 2010–2011, 2011–2012, 2012-2013, and 2016-2017 (Class B).

West Carroll High School's music department has secured a music sweepstakes trophy (1st-3rd) every year the high school has existed (2005 – present). Since the 2005–2006 academic year, an IHSA music sweepstakes trophy requires a school to finish in the top 10 of its respective class.
