= Scales Mound High School =

School in Scales Mound, Illinois, United States

Location
- 210 Main Street; Scales Mound, Jo Daviess County, Illinois 61075; United States
- Coordinates: 42.4749°N 90.2506°W

Information
- Type: Comprehensive Public High School
- School district: Scales Mound Community Unit School District 211
- Principal: Matt Wiederholt
- Teaching staff: 10.01 (FTE)
- Grades: 9–12
- Enrollment: 71 (2023-2024)
- Student to teacher ratio: 7.09
- Campus type: Rural, fringe
- Colors: Kelly Green, White
- Athletics conference: Northwest Upstate Illini
- Team name: Hornets
- Website: Scales Mound District Website

Scales Mound High School, or SMHS, is a public four-year high school located at 210 Main Street in Scales Mound, Illinois, a village in Jo Daviess County, Illinois, in the Midwestern United States. SMHS serves the community and surrounding area of Scales Mound. The campus is located 25 miles east of Dubuque, Iowa, and serves a mixed village and rural residential community.

== Academics ==
Potential reference/citation:

== Athletics ==
Scales Mound High School Mascot

Scales Mound High School competes in the Northwest Upstate Illini Conference and it is a member school in the Illinois High School Association. Their mascot is the Hornets, with school colors of kelly green and white. The school has no state championships on record in team athletics and activities, however in the fall of 2010 their volleyball team placed 2nd in the state for IHSA Division 1A. In the spring of 2011 the girls basketball team, River Ridge/Scales Mound placed 2nd in state for IHSA Division 1A. Due to their small enrollment, SMHS coops with neighboring River Ridge High School for some sports (Boys Baseball, Boys Golf, Girls Basketball, and Girls Softball). SMHS also cooperates with neighboring Benton High School (WI) for Boys Football.

== History ==
Scales Mound High School has no known consolidations in the recent past. Surrounding communities may have possessed high schools at some time which were consolidated into the current SMHS. Potential reference/citation:
