= Benton School District (Wisconsin) =

School district in Wisconsin, United States

Benton School District is a school district headquartered in Benton, Wisconsin. It serves grades K-12.

As of 2015 the high school has 96 students.

To ensure its continued operation despite the small size of its student body, the school district shares functions with other school districts: the operator of the cafeteria originates from the Southwestern Wisconsin School District, the high school's students partake in some classes and several athletic teams of Shullsburg High School, and Benton High places its students in the American football team of Scales Mound High School in Scales Mound, Illinois.
