= Stockton High School (Illinois) =

Location
- 540 North Rush Street; Stockton, Illinois 61085; United States; 42.3555°N 90.0113°W

Information
- Type: public secondary
- School district: Stockton Community Unit School District 206
- Superintendent: James Bunting
- Principal: Casey Downey
- Teaching staff: 16.75 (FTE)
- Grades: 9–12
- Enrollment: 171 (2023-2024)
- Student to teacher ratio: 10.21
- Campus type: Rural, fringe
- Colors: maroon gold
- Athletics conference: Northwest Upstate Illini
- Mascot: Blackhawks
- Yearbook: Blackhawk
- Website: Stockton High School

Stockton High School, or SHS, is a public four-year high school located at 540 North Rush Street in Stockton, Illinois, a village in Jo Daviess County, Illinois, in the Midwestern United States. SHS serves the community and surrounding areas of Stockton. The campus is located 42 miles southeast of Dubuque, Iowa and 51 miles west of Rockford, Illinois, and serves a mixed village and rural residential community.

== Academics ==
Based on the Illinois School Report Card for the 2018–19 school year, Stockton had a graduation rate of 95% and an Advanced Placement participation rate of 26%. Additionally, in 2019, Stockton ranked as the 5,757 best school in the United States, and 190 in Illinois based on U.S. News & World Report.

== Athletics and activities ==
Stockton High School competes in the Northwest Upstate Illini Conference and is a member school in the Illinois High School Association. Their mascot is the Blackhawks, with school colors of maroon and gold. The school has 6 state championships on record in team athletics and activities: Boys Football in 1979–1980 (2A) and 1991–1992 (1A), and Music in 2011–2012, 2012–2013, 2013–2014, and 2014–2015. Due to their small enrollment, SHS coops with neighboring high schools for several sports (Warren High School for Boys Baseball, Girls Softball, and Girls Track and Field (Combined Mascot is the "Warhawks"); and Lena-Winslow High School for Boys Wrestling (Combined mascot is the "Pantherhawks") .
