= East Dubuque High School =

School in East Dubuque, Illinois, United States

Location
- 200 Parklane Drive; East Dubuque, Jo Daviess County, Illinois 61025; United States
- Coordinates: 42.4972°N 90.6257°W

Information
- Type: Comprehensive Public High School
- School district: East Dubuque Community Unit School District 119
- Superintendent: TJ Potts
- Principal: Darren Sirianni
- Staff: 18.45 (FTE)
- Grades: 7–12
- Enrollment: 181 (2023-2024)
- Student to teacher ratio: 9.81
- Campus type: Small city
- Colors: Royal Blue, White
- Athletics conference: Northwest Upstate Illini
- Mascot: Warriors
- Rivals: Galena Pirates
- Website: East Dubuque High School Website

East Dubuque High School and jr high, or EDHS / js, is a public four-year high school located at 200 Parklane Drive in East Dubuque, Illinois, a small city in Jo Daviess County, Illinois, in the Midwestern United States. EDHS serves the community and surrounding area of East Dubuque. The campus is located 2 miles east of Dubuque, Iowa, and serves a mixed small city and rural residential community.

== Academics ==
East Dubuque has had successful academic teams, accumulating many winning seasons and playoff appearances. The Warriors made it to the Regional Championship of the IHSA Scholastic Bowl tournament in 2008. East Dubuque also got academic attention when one of its students received a perfect score on the ACT. In 2019, East Dubuque ranked as the 3,725 best schools in the United States, and 129 in Illinois based on U.S. News & World Report.

== Athletics ==
East Dubuque High School competes in the Northwest Upstate Illini Conference and is a member school in the Illinois High School Association. Their mascot is the Warriors, with school colors of royal blue and white. In 2001, Abby Redmon, while running for the Galena (coop) track & field team, won a state championship in the 300-meter low hurdles. The football team won the NUIC championship in 2009 and 2010 and participated in the IHSA state football tournament, making it to the quarterfinals each season, ironically losing both years to Lena-Winslow High School, a team from the same conference.

== History ==
East Dubuque High School has no known consolidations in the recent past. Surrounding communities may have possessed high schools at some time which were consolidated into the current EDHS. Potential reference/citation: East Dubuque High School's original home was built in 1893 atop Montgomery hill overlooking the Mississippi River and the Iowa/Illinois border. The old building saw its last graduating class in 1978 when a new school was built near the Wisconsin border. The old school still stands today at 430 Sidney Street as Ahva Living of East Dubuque, housing some people who attended the school as students decades earlier.
