= Warren High School (Warren, Illinois) =

Location
- 311 South Water Street; Warren, Illinois 61087; United States
- Coordinates: 42.4950°N 89.9894°W

Information
- Type: public secondary
- Motto: Excellence! Believe It! Achieve It!
- School district: Warren Community Unit School District 205
- Principal: Andrew Janecke
- Staff: 18.50 (FTE)
- Grades: 6–12
- Enrollment: 186 (2023-2024)
- Student to teacher ratio: 10.05
- Campus type: Rural, fringe
- Colors: orange black
- Athletics conference: Northwest Upstate Illini
- Mascot: Warriors
- Website: Warren High School

Warren High School, or WHS, is a public four-year high school located at 311 South Water Street in Warren, Illinois, a village in Jo Daviess County, Illinois, in the Midwestern United States. WHS serves the communities and surrounding areas of Warren, Apple River, and Nora. The campus is located 38 miles east of Dubuque, Iowa, and serves a mixed village and rural residential community.

== Academics ==
Warren High School and Elementary School are both part of the Northwest Special Education Cooperative.

== Athletics ==
Warren High School competes in the Northwest Upstate Illini Conference and is a member school in the Illinois High School Association. Their mascot is the Warriors, with school colors of orange and black. The school has one state championship on record in team athletics and activities. 2019-20 Football State Championship in Division 7 in Wisconsin-Coop with South Wayne Wisconsin. Due to their small enrollment, WHS coops with a neighboring high school for several sports (Stockton High School for Boys Baseball and Girls Track and Field).

== History ==
Warren High School has no known consolidations in the recent past. Surrounding communities may have possessed high schools at some time which were consolidated into the current RRHS.
