= Pecatonica High School (Illinois) =

Location
- 1300 Main Street; Pecatonica, Illinois 61063; United States
- 42.30232°N 89.3582°W

Information
- School type: Public Secondary
- School district: Pecatonica Community Unit School District No. 321
- Superintendent: Carl Carlson
- Principal: Kevin Kunkel
- Teaching staff: 22.00 (FTE)
- Grades: 9–12
- Gender: Coed
- Enrollment: 318 (2023–2024)
- Student to teacher ratio: 14.45
- Colors: Purple, Vegas Gold
- Athletics conference: NUIC (North Division)
- Team name: Indians
- Yearbook: Aim 'Igh
- Website: PecSchools.com

Pecatonica High School, affectionately known as "Pec", is located in the town of Pecatonica, Illinois. The campus is located 15 miles west of Rockford and 15 miles east of Freeport. It is located just one mile north of U.S. Route 20, a major east–west highway connected to Interstate 90. The Pecatonica Community School District ranks as the sixth largest in Winnebago County. Only the districts of Rockford, Rockton Hononegah, Machesney Park Harlem, Winnebago and South Beloit are larger.

The school district boundary includes Pecatonica and Westlake Village.

== Facilities ==
Pecatonica Community Unit School District #321 presently operates three school buildings. The Grade School, which was originally the high school, was built in three stages. The first stage was constructed in 1938 and was used as a high school for many years. The two additions to that structure were built in 1962 and 1970 respectively. The Middle School, also a former high school building, was built in 1958 and also accommodated two additions to the original structure in 1967 and 1970. In 2003, the current high school building opened. This state of the art facility has an approximate square footage of 107,000. Along with the new school, a football field and eight lane track were constructed during the building project. The high school complex also includes a baseball diamond and play field space for physical education classes. The theme for the current school reflects a flexible multi-purpose facility that will allow for both school based and community based activities.

Within the facility, the building houses a modern library; a fine arts department, that includes graphic arts as well as chorus and band; an agricultural department; math, science, English departments, industrial technology, foreign language, and social sciences. The physical education department includes two gymnasiums, four locker rooms, a weight room, and training room. Additionally, Pecatonica High School offers two "off-campus" programs. Life-science classes are offered in a joint venture with the Illinois Department of Natural Resources at the Torstenson Youth Conservation Education Center located two miles East of town along the Pecatonica River. Students are also offered blacksmithing classes in a turn-of-the-century facility located near the middle school.

== Academics ==
Based on the Illinois School Report Card for the 2018–19 school year, Pecatonica had a graduation rate of 92% and an Advanced Placement participation rate of 26%. Additionally, in 2019, Pec ranked as the 6,170 best school in the United States, 198 in Illinois and 3rd in the Rockford metro area based on U.S. News & World Report.

== Athletics ==
The Indians compete in the Northwest Upstate Illini Conference. They participate in several IHSA sponsored athletics and activities, including; football, girls volleyball, boys & girls basketball, boys & girls golf, boys & girls track & field, baseball, softball, bass fishing and music. Due to their small enrollment, "Pec" coops with neighboring high schools for nine sports (Byron High School for boys & girls swimming & diving and Durand High School for boys football, boys wrestling, boys baseball, boys & girls cross country and boys & girls track & field.).

=== Teams ===
The following teams finished in the top four of their respective IHSA sponsored state championship tournaments:

- Music Sweepstakes: 2nd place (1982–83)
- Girls Basketball: 1st place Class 1A (2024–25)

=== Individual ===
The following athletes finished the season as state champion:

Athlete(s)	Sport/Activity	Event/Level	Gender	Year	Class
Carl Colby	Track & Field	Pole Vault	Boys	1900–01	-
Rachel Knapp	Track & Field	1600m Run	Girls	1989–90	A

== Notable alumni ==
Trisha Paytas, YouTube personality and singer
