= Lanark, Illinois =

Lanark
- The City of Lanark
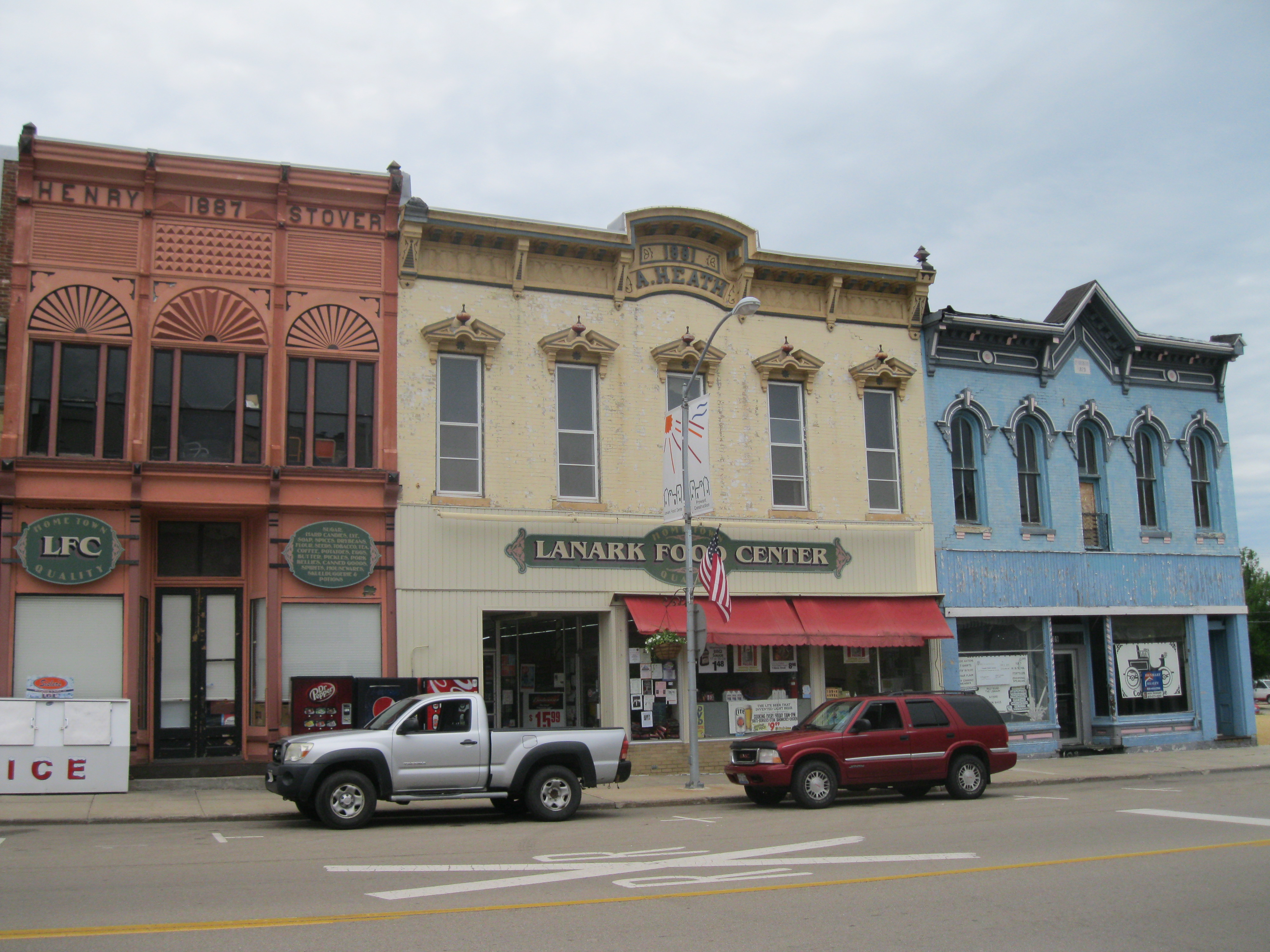
- Historic commercial buildings in Lanark's business district
- Nickname: Tree City U.S.A.
- Location of Lanark in Carroll County, Illinois.
- Coordinates: 42°06′07″N 89°50′00″W
- Country: United States
- State: Illinois
- County: Carroll
- Founded: 1861

Government
  - Type: Mayor-Council

Area
  - Total: 1.12 sq mi (2.90 km^{2})
  - Land: 1.12 sq mi (2.90 km^{2})
  - Water: 0 sq mi (0.00 km^{2})
- Elevation: 873 ft (266 m)

Population (2020)
  - Total: 1,504
  - Density: 1,342.2/sq mi (518.21/km^{2})
- Time zone: UTC-6 (CST)
  - Summer (DST): UTC-5 (CDT)
- ZIP code: 61046
- Area code: 815
- FIPS code: 17-41859
- GNIS feature ID: 2395622
- Website: lanarkil.gov

Lanark is a city in Carroll County, Illinois, United States. The population was 1,504 at the 2020 census. The city was named after Lanark, in Scotland.

== History ==
Under the auspices of the Chicago, Milwaukee, St. Paul and Pacific Railroad (Milwaukee Road), Daniel W. Dame purchased 500 acres (200 ha), laid out the city of Lanark, and was elected its first mayor in 1861. In 1886, 40 residents each donated one dollar to form a public library, and a primary and secondary school was completed in August 1871. On November 25, 1893, the original school was destroyed by fire.

Early in the Twentieth Century, Lanark was home to the Cotta steam car company.

In 1986 Lanark High School was consolidated with nearby Shannon High School to form the Eastland School District. The high school and grade school were originally located in Lanark, with the middle school in Shannon. After the end of the 2012–2013 school year, the Eastland School Board made the decision to close the Elementary building in Lanark, and move those students to the Shannon building. The Middle School students were then relocated to the High School building in Lanark, now known as the Eastland Jr/Sr High School.

== Geography ==
According to the 2021 census gazetteer files, Lanark has a total area of 1.12 square miles (2.90 km^{2}), all land.

=== Climate ===
Climate data for Lanark, Illinois
Month	Jan	Feb	Mar	Apr	May	Jun	Jul	Aug	Sep	Oct	Nov	Dec	Year
Mean daily maximum °F (°C)	28 (−2)	36 (2)	46 (8)	61 (16)	72 (22)	82 (28)	84 (29)	82 (28)	75 (24)	64 (18)	46 (8)	34 (1)	59 (15)
Mean daily minimum °F (°C)	7 (−14)	12 (−11)	25 (−4)	36 (2)	46 (8)	54 (12)	59 (15)	55 (13)	46 (8)	36 (2)	27 (−3)	14 (−10)	35 (2)
Average precipitation inches (mm)	1.43 (36.3)	1.52 (38.6)	2.63 (66.8)	3.67 (93.2)	4.34 (110.2)	4.77 (121.2)	3.83 (97.3)	4.54 (115.3)	3.48 (88.4)	2.73 (69.3)	2.84 (72.1)	2.02 (51.3)	37.8 (960)
Source: weather.com

== Demographics ==
Historical population
Census	Pop.	Note	%±
1870	972		—
1880	1,198		23.3%
1890	1,295		8.1%
1900	1,306		0.8%
1910	1,175		−10.0%
1920	1,297		10.4%
1930	1,208		−6.9%
1940	1,292		7.0%
1950	1,359		5.2%
1960	1,473		8.4%
1970	1,495		1.5%
1980	1,483		−0.8%
1990	1,382		−6.8%
2000	1,584		14.6%
2010	1,457		−8.0%
2020	1,504		3.2%
U.S. Decennial Census

=== 2020 census ===
As of the 2020 census, Lanark had a population of 1,504, with 620 households and 433 families residing in the city. The population density was 1,341.66 inhabitants per square mile (518.02/km^{2}), and there were 696 housing units at an average density of 620.87 per square mile (239.72/km^{2}).

The median age was 42.1 years. 24.6% of residents were under the age of 18 and 19.3% were 65 years of age or older. For every 100 females, there were 98.4 males, and for every 100 females age 18 and over, there were 96.9 males.

0.0% of residents lived in urban areas, while 100.0% lived in rural areas.

There were 620 households in Lanark, of which 28.5% had children under the age of 18 living in them. Of all households, 50.5% were married-couple households, 16.8% were households with a male householder and no spouse or partner present, and 26.3% were households with a female householder and no spouse or partner present. About 29.2% of all households were made up of individuals and 15.2% had someone living alone who was 65 years of age or older. The average household size was 2.77 and the average family size was 2.32.

There were 696 housing units, of which 10.9% were vacant. The homeowner vacancy rate was 3.9% and the rental vacancy rate was 12.4%.

Racial composition as of the 2020 census
Race	Number	Percent
White	1,412	93.9%
Black or African American	9	0.6%
American Indian and Alaska Native	2	0.1%
Asian	8	0.5%
Native Hawaiian and Other Pacific Islander	0	0.0%
Some other race	18	1.2%
Two or more races	55	3.7%
Hispanic or Latino (of any race)	38	2.5%

=== Income and poverty ===
The median income for a household in the city was $47,917, and the median income for a family was $77,614. Males had a median income of $41,146 versus $23,354 for females. The per capita income for the city was $29,028. About 11.3% of families and 15.5% of the population were below the poverty line, including 22.7% of those under age 18 and 6.5% of those age 65 or over.

== Education ==
Lanark is a part of Eastland Community Unit School District #308, which also includes Shannon and Lake Carroll. Lanark, Shannon and Lake Carroll are the home of the Eastland Cougars. Eastland Elementary School, is located in Shannon and Eastland Jr./Sr. High School, is located in Lanark.
