= Lena-Winslow High School =

Location
- 516 Freemont Street; Lena, Illinois 61048; United States
- Coordinates: 42°22′43″N 89°48′56″W

Information
- School type: Public Secondary
- Opened: 1958
- Status: Open
- School district: Lena-Winslow Community Unit School District No. 202
- Superintendent: Tom Chiles
- Principal: Ann Dezell
- Teaching staff: 18.45 (on an FTE basis)
- Grades: 9–12
- Gender: Coed
- Enrollment: 241 (2023–2024)
- Student to teacher ratio: 13.06
- Colors: Black, Gold
- Fight song: Wave the Flag
- Athletics conference: NUIC (North Division)
- Mascot: Perky Panther
- Team name: Panthers
- Rival: Dakota, Aquin Stockton, EPC, Forreston
- Yearbook: Panthera
- Website: Le-Win.net

Lena-Winslow High School, dedicated December 7, 1958, and affectionately known as "Le-Win", is a high school located in the town of Lena, Illinois. Part of the Lena-Winslow Community Unit School District, Le-Win became the third largest school district in Stephenson County, when, in 1949, the State of Illinois mandated that larger school districts be created. Only the districts of Dakota and Freeport are larger.

== Facilities ==
Lena-Winslow Community Unit No. 202 includes students from the villages of Lena, Winslow, McConnell, Eleroy and Waddams Grove. Because only Lena and Winslow had High Schools, their names were both given to the new union. Originally the high school was provided with students from 21 rural elementary schools including McConnell, Eleroy, and Waddams Grove, as well as the elementary schools in Lena and Winslow. Currently, all students within the CUSD attend Lena-Winslow Elementary and Jr. High prior to attending the high school.

== Academics ==
Based on the Illinois School Report Card for the 2018-19 school year, Lena-Winslow had a graduation rate of 96% and an Advanced Placement participation rate of 45%. Additionally, in 2019, Le-Win ranked as the 9,338th best school in the United States, 278th in Illinois and 1st in the Freeport metro area based on U.S. News & World Report.

== Athletics ==
The Panthers compete in the Northwest Upstate Illini Conference. They participate in several IHSA sponsored athletics and activities, including; football, cross country, girls volleyball, boys & girls basketball, wrestling, boys & girls golf, boys & girls track & field, baseball, softball, speech, and music.

=== Teams ===
The following teams finished in the top four of their respective IHSA sponsored state championship tournaments:

- Football:
  Class 1A Semi-Finalist (2009–10)
  Class 1A State Champions (2010–11)
  Class 1A State Champions (2013–14)
  Class 1A State Champions (2016–17)
  Class 1A State Champions (2017–18)
  Class 1A State Champions (2018–19)
  Class 1A State Champions (2019–20)
  Class 1A State Champions (2021–22)
  Class 1A State Champions (2022–23)
  Class 1A State Champions (2025–26)

=== Individual ===
The following athletes finished the season as state champion:

Athlete(s)	Sport/Activity	Event/Level	Gender	Year	Class
Andy McPeek	Wrestling	189 lbs	Boys	1992-93	A
Jeremy Daughenbaugh; Kurt Kramer; Jayson Lietzen; Jeremy Spencer	Track & Field	4x100m Relay	Boys	1992-93	A
Courtney Kuehl; Chrissy Lehmann; Tammy Schurch; Kelli Wessels	Track & Field	4x400m Relay	Girls	1997-98	A
Carl Bonvillain	Wrestling	167 lbs	Boys	2006-07	A
Trey Griffin	Wrestling	167 lbs	Boys	2009-10	1A
Trey Griffin	Wrestling	189 lbs	Boys	2010-11	1A
Quincy Kalkbrenner	Wrestling	145 lbs	Boys	2012-13	1A
Logan Staver	Wrestling	182 lbs	Boys	2012-13	1A
Ty Harmston	Wrestling	195 lbs	Boys	2012-13	1A
Quincy Kalkbrenner	Wrestling	160 lbs	Boys	2013-14	1A
Ty Harmston	Wrestling	220 lbs	Boys	2013-14	1A
Ian Kuehl	Wrestling	285 lbs	Boys	2017-18	1A
Carmen DeVries	Track & Field	400m Dash	Girls	2017-18	1A
Griffin Luke	Wrestling	182 lbs	Boys	2022-23	1A

== School Song ==
Wave the Flag (For Le-Win High School) is the fight song for Lena-Winslow's athletic teams, adapted from the University of Chicago Maroons. The tune was adapted by the University of Chicago from Miami University's "Marching Song" written in 1908 by Raymond H. Burke, a University of Chicago graduate who joined Miami's faculty in 1906.

== Notable alumni ==
- Gennings Dunker, college football offensive tackle for the Iowa Hawkeyes
