= Dakota, Illinois =

Dakota
- Village
- Location of Dakota in Stephenson County, Illinois.
- Coordinates: 42°23′16″N 89°31′36″W
- Country: United States
- State: Illinois
- County: Stephenson
- Township: Dakota
- Incorporated: March 11, 1869

Area
  - Total: 0.25 sq mi (0.64 km^{2})
  - Land: 0.25 sq mi (0.64 km^{2})
  - Water: 0 sq mi (0.00 km^{2})
- Elevation: 942 ft (287 m)

Population (2020)
  - Total: 500
  - Density: 2,011.7/sq mi (776.71/km^{2})
- Time zone: UTC-6 (CST)
  - Summer (DST): UTC-5 (CDT)
- ZIP code: 61018
- Area code: 815
- FIPS code: 17-18342
- GNIS feature ID: 2398670
- Website: villageofdakota.com

Dakota is a village in Stephenson County, Illinois, United States. The population was 500 at the 2020 census, down from 506 in 2010.

== History ==
Dakota was laid out in 1857 when the railroad was extended to that point. A post office has been in operation at Dakota since 1857.

== Geography ==
According to the 2010 census, Dakota has a total area of 0.29 square miles (0.75 km^{2}), all land.

== Demographics ==
Historical population
Census	Pop.	Note	%±
1880	257		—
1890	283		10.1%
1900	269		−4.9%
1910	227		−15.6%
1920	248		9.3%
1930	249		0.4%
1940	268		7.6%
1950	318		18.7%
1960	363		14.2%
1970	440		21.2%
1980	571		29.8%
1990	549		−3.9%
2000	499		−9.1%
2010	506		1.4%
2020	500		−1.2%
U.S. Decennial Census

As of the census of 2000, there were 499 people, 197 households, and 141 families residing in the town. The population density was 1,731.9 inhabitants per square mile (668.7/km^{2}). There were 203 housing units at an average density of 704.6 per square mile (272.0/km^{2}). The racial makeup of the town was 98.00% White, 0.80% African American, 0.40% Native American, 0.40% Asian, 0.40% from other races. Hispanic or Latino of any race were 0.40% of the population.

There were 197 households, out of which 32.0% had children under the age of 18 living with them, 58.9% were married couples living together, 11.2% had a female householder with no husband present, and 28.4% were non-families. 27.4% of all households were made up of individuals, and 11.7% had someone living alone who was 65 years of age or older. The average household size was 2.53 and the average family size was 3.03.

In the town, the population was spread out, with 24.6% under the age of 18, 9.2% from 18 to 24, 30.1% from 25 to 44, 22.2% from 45 to 64, and 13.8% who were 65 years of age or older. The median age was 38 years. For every 100 females, there were 96.5 males. For every 100 females age 18 and over, there were 92.8 males.

The median income for a household in the town was $43,942, and the median income for a family was $50,357. Males had a median income of $35,263 versus $25,000 for females. The per capita income for the town was $18,440. About 1.4% of families and 3.9% of the population were below the poverty line, including 3.6% of those under age 18 and 8.8% of those age 65 or over.

== Education ==
It is in the Dakota Community Unit School District 201.
