= Aquin Catholic Schools =

- Aquin Elementary School
- Aquin Junior-Senior High School
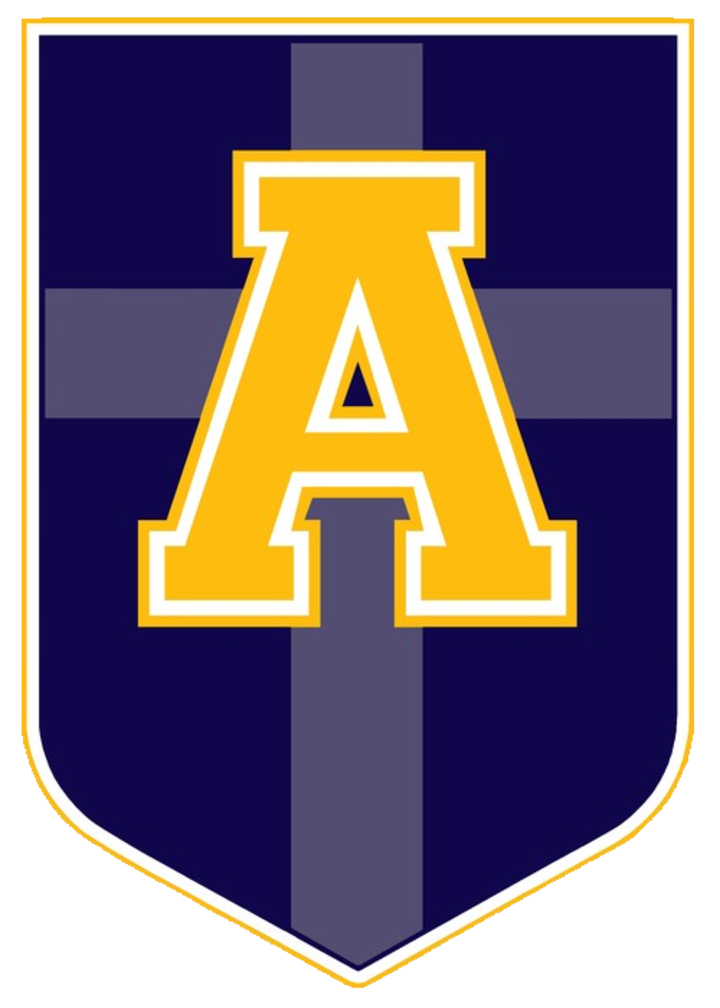

Location
- 1419 South Galena Avenue; Freeport, Illinois 61032; United States; 42°17′9″N 89°36′22″W

Information
- Type: Private
- Denomination: Roman Catholic
- Patron saint: St. Thomas Aquinas
- Established: September 7, 1923
- Status: Closed
- Closed: May 29, 2026
- Gender: Coed
- Colors: Blue and gold
- Mascot: Bulldog
- Accreditation: WCEA Accreditation
- Website: www.aquinschools.org

Aquin Catholic Schools was a private Catholic school in Freeport, Illinois, United States, in the Roman Catholic Diocese of Rockford.

== History ==
The school opened on September 7, 1923. In July 1924, Fr. Charles Conley was appointed pastor of St. Mary's parish and was named superintendent of the school. Enrollment increased during that year and 6 acres of property adjacent to St. Vincent's orphanage was acquired to build an independent high school. The name was changed to Aquin High School at the start of the 1924 school year. In September 2007, Thomas G. Doran, the Bishop of Rockford, renamed the three Catholic schools in Freeport to Aquin Catholic Schools. In 2022, the elementary students moved to the Junior-High School campus. The last high school courses were offered in the 2023-2024 school year with the elementary school closing at the end of the 2025-2026 school year.

== Traditions ==
The school's prom was open to 11th and 12th grade (junior and senior) students. Since 1926, the high school has a special prom-date lottery system used so each student has a date during prom and so cohesion increases among the students. The nuns operating the school at that time first created the tradition, in part to provide inclusion for the students who attended Aquin from St. Vincent's Orphanage (just across the street), and as years passed other elements became a part of the annual event.

Annually, the students themselves choose to renew this small-school tradition. In 2017 Michelle Gallagher, who served as the junior class adviser, stated, "It's less of a date and more like something fun to do with your classmates." For the prospective prom-goers, on the day of "Prom Draw", the female students gather in the gymnasium and the male students in the library. The female students often wear masks, disguises or paper bags so the male students, when they see them, will not know who is who.

Each male student, wearing their normal attire, or dressed in a formal outfit or a special costume, draws the name of a female student randomly from a hat. For their part of the tradition, many of the male students perform skits, with the aim of entertaining their prospective date. After the skits, the male students ask the females to be their prom dates. The female students give gift bags to the males, and some males also have gift bags for the females.

== Athletics ==
The Bulldogs previously competed in the Northwest Upstate Illini Conference. They participated in numerous IHSA-sponsored athletics and activities, including football, girls cross country, girls volleyball, boys & girls basketball, boys & girls golf, boys baseball, girls softball, and girls swimming and diving.

=== Teams ===
The following teams finished in the top four of their respective IHSA sponsored state championship tournaments:

- Football:
  1A State Champions (1981–82)
  1A State Champions (1986–87)
  1A State Champions (2005–06)
- Basketball (girls):
  1A State Champions (2011–12)
  1A State Champions (2012–13)
