= Illinois School Report Card =

School performance report

The Illinois School Report Card is a measurement of school performance administered by the Illinois State Board of Education. Each public school district in Illinois, including special charter districts, must submit to parents, taxpayers, the Governor, the General Assembly and the State Board of Education a school report card assessing the performance of its schools and students. The report card is an index of school performance measured against statewide and local standards and provides information to make prior year comparisons and to set future year targets through the school improvement plan.

== Included Information ==
=== Academic Progress ===
The Illinois School Report Card includes applicable test results for the groups which visit the school. This includes the SAT and the IAR. Other information, including the graduation rate and percentage of students on track to graduate are also included in this section.

=== Environment ===
This section includes information on student surveys and finances.

=== Students ===
Information on student demographics are included here. Information includes: racial diversity, low income, gifted, students with disabilities, and amount of absenteeism.

=== Accountability ===
Information on school improvement funds and Title I.

=== Teachers ===
Includes demographics on teachers at schools. Information on student teacher ratios, teacher education, teacher pay, and teacher absences are included.

=== Administrators ===
Information on administrator pay and administrator to student ratios are included in this section.

=== School Highlights ===
Information on courses offered as well as information on activities provided are listed here.

=== Feeder Schools ===
Schools which feed this school

=== Retired Tests ===
Information from previous tests which have been retired. Notable tests include: PARCC and the ACT.

== See also ==
- List of school districts in Illinois
