= Tornado outbreak of April 8–9, 2015 =

Weather event in the United States

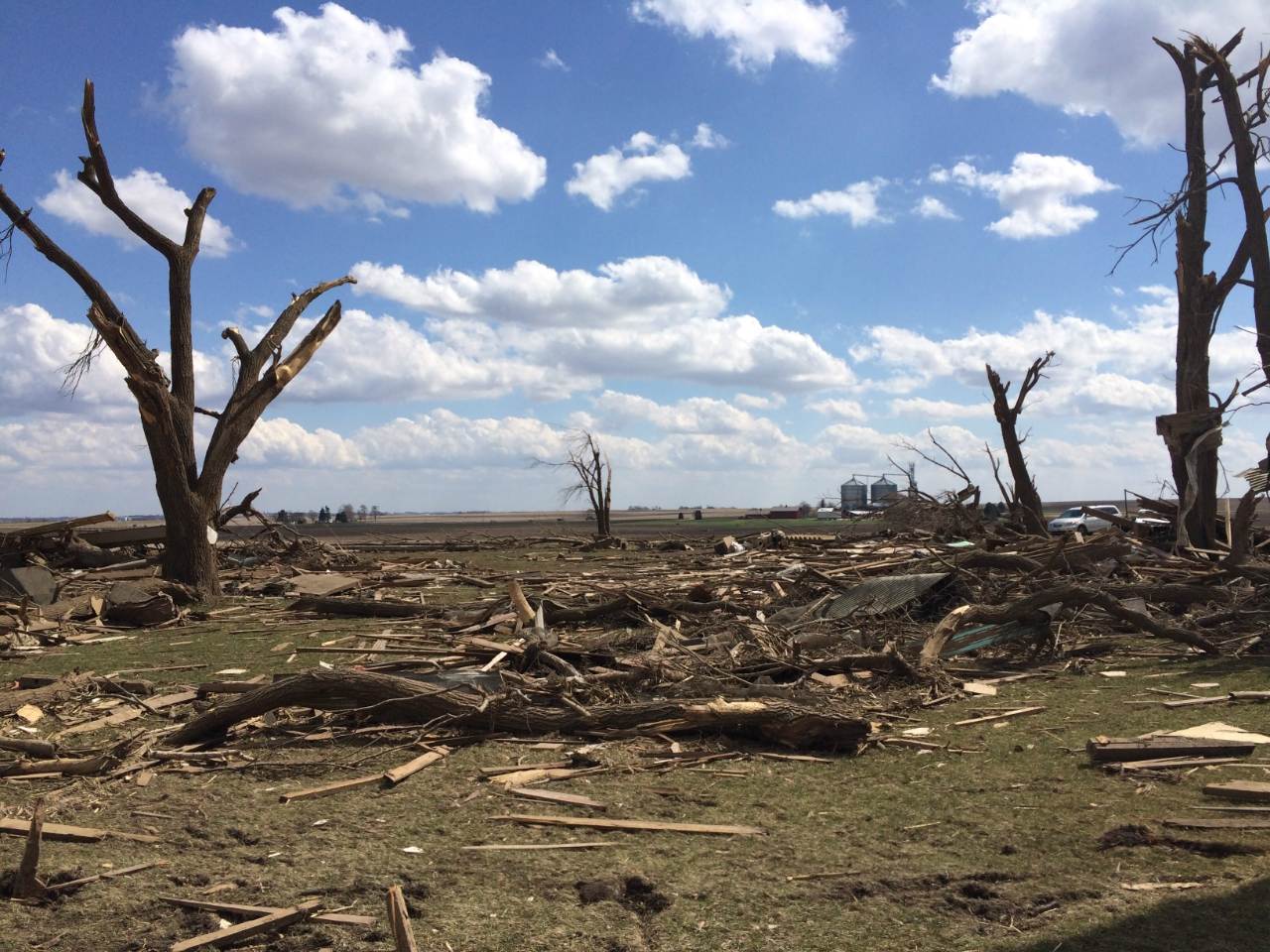
- High-end EF4 damage to a farmstead in Rochelle, Illinois

Meteorological history
- Formed: April 8, 2015
- Dissipated: April 9, 2015

Tornado outbreak
- Tornadoes: 27
- Max. rating: EF4 tornado
- Duration: about 36 hours
- Highest winds: Tornadic - 200 mph (320 km/h) near Rochelle, Illinois on April 9 Straight-line - 82 mph (132 km/h) at multiple locations.
- Largest hail: 4 in (10 cm) in Sullivan, Missouri on April 8

Overall effects
- Fatalities: 2
- Injuries: 11
- Damage: $20.93 million (2015 USD)
- Areas affected: High Plains, parts of the Midwest and Ohio Valley
- Part of the tornado outbreaks of 2015

A relatively small but damaging outbreak of tornadoes occurred in parts of the Great Plains and the Midwestern United States between April 8-9, 2015. There were 27 confirmed tornadoes during the two days, most of them weak; however, a few of them were powerful and damaging.

By far the most significant tornado of the outbreak was a very high-end EF4 wedge tornado that struck the towns of Rochelle and Fairdale, Illinois, causing catastrophic damage. It was also the strongest tornado recorded in 2015, as well as the strongest to occur in Illinois since the F5 tornado that struck Plainfield in 1990.

== Meteorological synopsis ==
On April 4, the Storm Prediction Center (SPC) issued its Day 6 severe weather outlook, highlighting a substantial and widespread risk for severe weather from southeastern Oklahoma to northeastern Illinois valid for April 9. This threat area was maintained in the Day 5 outlook and narrowed to a corridor from southern Missouri into northern Illinois in the Day 4 outlook. On April 7, a Day 3 Enhanced risk was issued across most of Illinois, eastern Missouri, and small portions of adjacent states. No further changes to the threat level were made, although the Enhanced risk was significantly expanded late on April 8 to include portions of the southern Great Lakes, lower Ohio Valley, Ozark Plateau, and Arklatex region. Around midday on April 9, the SPC issued a 10% hatched tornado threat area across much of northern Illinois and small portions of nearby states, signifying the potential for several tornadoes, of which one or two had the potential to be strong (EF2 or stronger on the Enhanced Fujita scale).

The catalyst for the severe weather outbreak came as a positively-tilted shortwave trough progressed across the central High Plains into the Great Plains and eventually through the western Great Lakes region. A weaker disturbance pushed from the Ozarks into the Northeast United States, acting to strengthen southwesterly winds aloft across the risk area. At the surface, a weak area of low pressure initially centered over northeastern Kansas early on April 9 progressed steadily northeast while intensifying, reaching the trisection of Iowa, Wisconsin, and Illinois by late that evening. A cold front stemming from the low progressed eastward across the Mid-South, whereas an arching warm front slowly pushed northward across eastern Iowa and northern Illinois. Modest surface heating ahead of the cold front allowed mid-level CAPE values to reach 1,000–1,500 J/kg, and a mass of rich moisture transported northward from the Gulf of Mexico pushed dewpoints into the lower 60s °F across the Enhanced risk area. Winds at 850mb strengthened at or above 45 mph (72 km/h) atop winds of 70 mph (110 km/h) at 700mb, creating a favorable setup for sustained supercells. Although the overall directional component of low-level winds was expected to be less than ideal as a whole, a small area of southeasterly surface winds developed near the surface low in northern Illinois.

At 1:50 p.m. CDT (18:50 UTC), the SPC issued a tornado watch for northern and central Illinois, far northwestern Indiana, far southern Wisconsin, and portions of Lake Michigan. A 60% chance of two or more tornadoes was assessed across the watch box, with a 40% chance of at least one strong tornado. Isolated shower activity had already begun forming across the region just before the issuance of watch, eventually growing into a line of strong to severe thunderstorms, including supercells.

== Confirmed tornadoes ==
Confirmed tornadoes by Enhanced Fujita rating
EFU	EF0	EF1	EF2	EF3	EF4	EF5	Total
0	16	9	1	0	1	0	27

=== April 8 event ===
List of confirmed tornadoes – Wednesday, April 8, 2015 (Note: All dates are based on the local time zone where the tornado touched down; however, all times are in Coordinated Universal Time for consistency.)
EF#	Location	County / Parish	State	Start Coord.	Time (UTC)	Path length	Max width	Damage (2015 USD)
EF1	Potosi	Washington	MO	37.9446°N 90.7992°W	2020–2038	4.1 mi (6.6 km)	300 yd (270 m)	$0
EF1	Several churches and businesses sustained roof damage, and trees, power lines, and business signs were downed throughout the town. A mobile home used for storage along with a building at a saw mill were destroyed.							
EF0	E of Buttermilk	Comanche	KS	—N/a	2324–2327	1.91 mi (3.07 km)	75 yd (69 m)	$0
EF0	A storm chaser observed a tornado with intermittent contact with the ground.							
EF0	NNE of Aetna	Barber	KS	—N/a	2349–0003	16.24 mi (26.14 km)	250 yd (230 m)	$0
EF0	This cone tornado remained mainly over open country, causing only tree damage.							
EF0	S of Lake City	Barber	KS	—N/a	0115–0116	0.57 mi (0.92 km)	50 yd (46 m)	$0
EF0	A trained storm spotter observed a brief tornado.							
EF0	N of Garden Plain	Sedgewick	KS	37.71°N 97.60°W	0132 – 0140	2.27 mi (3.65 km)	75 yd (69 m)	$0
EF0	A brief rope tornado damaged the roof of a barn.							
EF0	Rural Reno County	Reno	KS	37.7427°N 97.699°W	0140–0142	0.82 mi (1.32 km)	75 yd (69 m)	$0
EF0	A portion of a barn roof was ripped off and tossed into a field. A pontoon boat was pushed from one property onto the adjacent property.							
EF0	SW of Zenda	Kingman	KS	37.7376°N 98.1793°W	0143–0146	0.73 mi (1.17 km)	70 yd (64 m)	$0
EF0	A storm chaser reported a tornado over open country.							
EF0	NE of Hammon	Custer	OK	35.653°N 99.312°W	0158	0.2 mi (0.32 km)	30 yd (27 m)	$0
EF0	Brief tornado remained over open country, causing no damage.							

=== April 9 event ===
List of confirmed tornadoes – Thursday, April 9, 2015
EF#	Location	County / Parish	State	Start Coord.	Time (UTC)	Path length	Max width	Damage (2015 USD)
EF0	SE of Akron	Peoria	IL	40.8716°N 89.6204°W	1832–1833	0.15 mi (0.24 km)	10 yd (9.1 m)	$0
EF0	An emergency manager reported a brief tornado in an open field.							
EF1	W of Maysville to SE of DeWitt	Scott, Clinton	IA	41.6353°N 90.8953°W	2204–2230	22.38 mi (36.02 km)	100 yd (91 m)	$20,000
EF1	Mainly farm outbuildings and trees were damaged. A gas station sign was blown over, and a grain bin was thrown into a field. Homes sustained minor roof, siding, and porch damage.							
EF0	N of Moscow	Hillsdale	MI	42.0634°N 84.4987°W	2222–2224	0.6 mi (0.97 km)	70 yd (64 m)	$0
EF0	A residence suffered minor window and structural damage. A barn on a farm was essentially destroyed, a center pivot was flipped, and trees were damaged.							
EF1	Clinton to NE of Fulton	Clinton, Whiteside	IA, IL	41.8128°N 90.3156°W	2240–2300	12.47 mi (20.07 km)	75 yd (69 m)	$0
EF1	Rental storage buildings and a garage were destroyed. A few residences sustained minor roof damage, and farm outbuildings and trees were damaged.							
EF1	NE of Fulton	Whiteside, Carroll	IL	41.9233°N 90.0757°W	2302–2315	8.3 mi (13.4 km)	50 yd (46 m)	$0
EF1	Trees and outbuildings were damaged, one of which was lifted into power lines and destroyed. A tractor trailer was flipped.							
EF0	S of Cherry Valley	Winnebago, Boone	IL	42.1926°N 88.9548°W	2337–2340	2.84 mi (4.57 km)	25 yd (23 m)	$0
EF0	The tornado was photographed by trained spotters and emergency management; no damage was reported.							
EF2	NE of Mount Selman	Cherokee	TX	32.0888°N 95.2289°W	2338–2345	1.77 mi (2.85 km)	340 yd (310 m)	$300,000
EF2	Numerous trees were snapped or uprooted. The roof was removed from one outbuilding, and a second outbuilding was overturned. A house sustained minor damage to its roof and gutters, while a second residence had its roof torn off and a few exterior walls collapsed.							
EF4	NNE of Franklin Grove to NNW of Kirkland	Lee, Ogle, DeKalb, Boone	IL	41.853°N 89.2896°W	2339–0020	30.14 mi (48.51 km)	700 yd (0.64 km)	$19,000,000
EF4	2 deaths – See article on this tornado – There were 11 injuries.							
EF0	ENE of Lindenwood	Ogle	IL	42.0583°N 88.9752°W	0005–0008	1.86 mi (2.99 km)	100 yd (91 m)	$0
EF0	An aerial damage survey confirmed a satellite tornado to the Rochelle–Fairdale tornado.							
EF1	NE of Longview	Gregg	TX	32.5179°N 94.7316°W	0010–0015	1.31 mi (2.11 km)	335 yd (306 m)	$1,000,000
EF1	A nursing home sustained roof damage. A nearby mobile home park sustained damage, houses sustained minor to moderate damage, and three mobile homes were completely destroyed by fallen trees. The roof was ripped off a church.							
EF1	NW of Kirkland	DeKalb, Boone	IL	42.1334°N 88.8776°W	0015–0021	4.01 mi (6.45 km)	100 yd (91 m)	$80,000
EF1	Three barns were destroyed and two small outbuildings sustained heavy damage.							
EF1	NW of Hallsville	Harrison	TX	32.5465°N 94.6734°W	0020–0032	4.52 mi (7.27 km)	760 yd (690 m)	$300,000
EF1	A significant portion of roofing, in addition to HVAC equipment was removed from a warehouse building, and several houses sustained various degrees of damage. The wall of an outbuilding collapsed, while a second outbuilding lost a majority of its roofing. A mobile home was shifted off its foundation, while a second one had its roof removed and walls collapsed. Numerous trees were snapped or uprooted.							
EF0	S of Belvidere	Boone	IL	42.202°N 88.8465°W	0024–0025	0.42 mi (0.68 km)	30 yd (27 m)	$20,000
EF0	A satellite tornado to the EF4 Rochelle–Fairdale tornado heavily damaged a small zoo, killing four animals, and collapsed the walls of several outbuildings and small barns. Large softwood trees were snapped.							
EF1	SE of Belvidere	Boone	IL	42.1942°N 88.7748°W	0025–0031	3.92 mi (6.31 km)	50 yd (46 m)	$150,000
EF1	A detached garage was destroyed, the roof was ripped off a house, and several hardwood trees were snapped.							
EF0	SSE of Tovey	Christian	IL	39.5539°N 89.4361°W	0047–0048	0.14 mi (0.23 km)	10 yd (9.1 m)	$0
EF0	An emergency manager reported a brief tornado in an open field.							
EF1	ESE of Harvard	McHenry	IL	42.3982°N 88.5309°W	0050–0051	0.32 mi (0.51 km)	30 yd (27 m)	$0
EF1	Six to seven trees were uprooted, one of which landed on a house and caused roof damage. An antenna was blown off the roof as well.							
EF0	NW of Butler	Custer	OK	35.6809°N 99.2404°W	0208	0.2 mi (0.32 km)	30 yd (27 m)	$0
EF0	Trained storm spotters reported a brief tornado.							
EF0	N of Daisy	Cape Girardeau	MO	37.5251°N 89.8065°W	0216–0218	1.75 mi (2.82 km)	150 yd (140 m)	$6,000
EF0	Numerous trees and tree limbs were downed.							
EF0	W of Jackson	Cape Girardeau	MO	37.38°N 89.7246°W	0231–0233	1.7 mi (2.7 km)	130 yd (120 m)	$60,000
EF0	Approximately 12 houses had partial shingle loss or minor damage to gutters and fascia. Several mainly small trees or tree limbs were downed.							

=== Franklin Grove–Kirkland–Rochelle–Fairdale, Illinois ===
Franklin Grove–Kirkland–Rochelle–Fairdale, Illinois
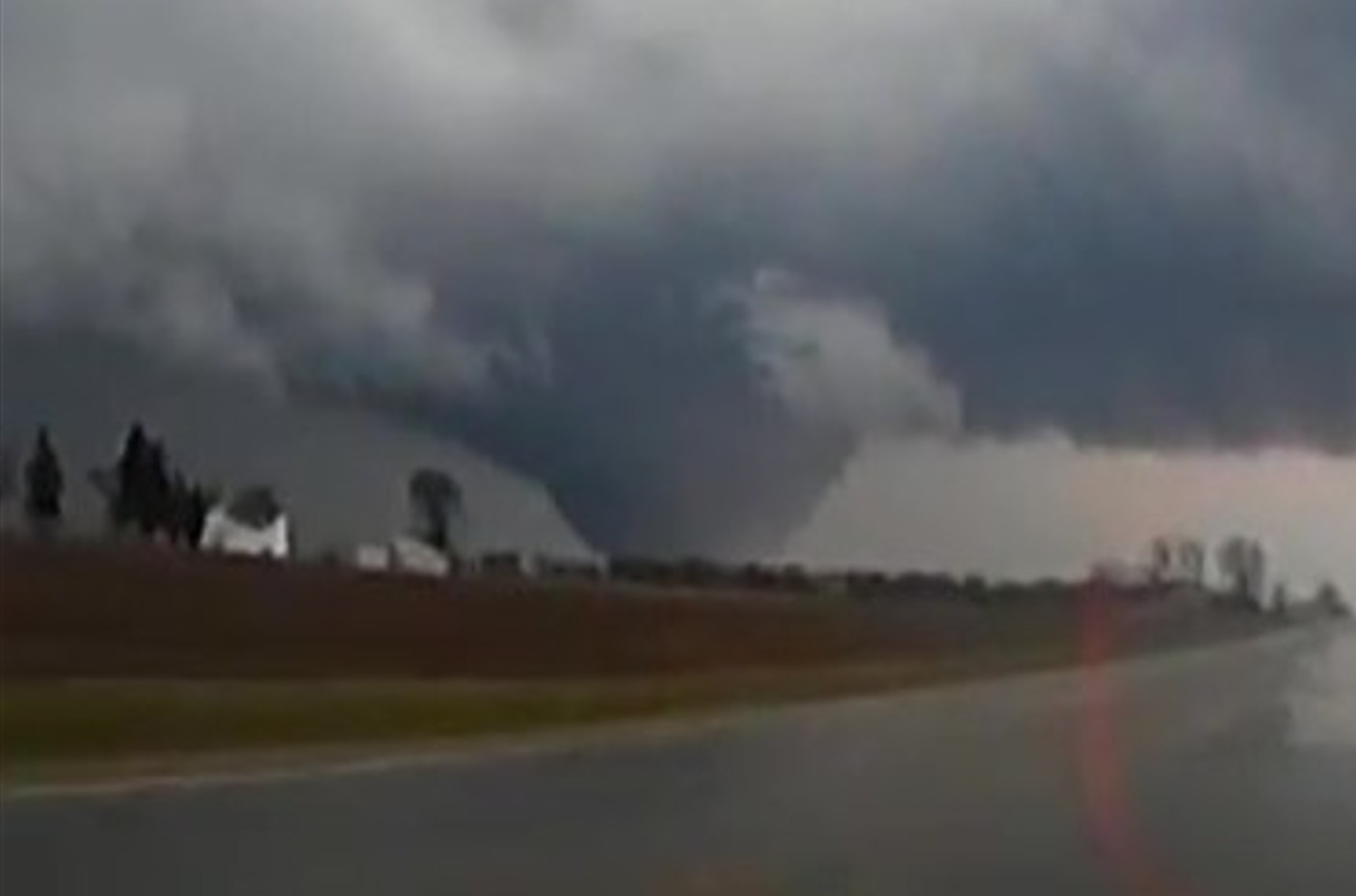
- The tornado captured by a dash cam in Rochelle.

EF4 tornado
- on the Enhanced Fujita scale
- Highest winds: 200 mph (320 km/h)

Overall effects
- Fatalities: 2
- Injuries: 11
- Damage: $19 million (2015 USD)

This destructive and very powerful high-end EF4 wedge tornado struck parts of Rochelle and the adjacent town, Fairdale, Illinois. The tornado began as a small cone-shaped tornado, causing mostly minor damage near Franklin Grove and Ashton, though a Crest Foods plant sustained considerable damage. The tornado became large and violent as it struck a semi-rural subdivision west of Rochelle, where some ground scouring occurred and large, anchor-bolted homes were swept away, though close inspection revealed that some of the washers were missing from the anchor bolts, and that low-lying shrubbery and vehicles near the homes was left mostly intact, preventing a higher rating. Winds in this area were estimated to have reached 200 mph, the very upper limit of the EF4 range. The tornado briefly weakened to EF2 strength as it passed between Hillcrest and Kings, damaging several farmsteads before reaching high-end EF4 intensity once again as it crossed IL 64, where a row of five homes was obliterated, along with a nearby farmstead. Extensive wind-rowing of debris occurred in nearby fields, and vehicles were tossed. A large restaurant was destroyed by EF3 level winds in this area as well. The tornado then weakened, causing EF1 to EF2 damage to a warehouse structure, outbuildings, and numerous trees as it passed south of Lindenwood. East of Lindenwood, further weakening occurred as the tornado damaged homes and outbuildings at EF1 strength, and a brief EF0 satellite tornado was observed. The tornado re-intensified to high-end EF3 strength as it devastated the small town of Fairdale, where the two fatalities occurred. Every structure in town sustained some type of damage, and multiple poorly anchored homes were leveled and swept away. Intense cycloidal marks were observed in farm fields outside of town. Past Fairdale, the tornado produced EF2 and EF3 damage as large barns were destroyed, a house lost its second floor and sustained collapse of exterior walls on the first floor, and large hardwood trees were denuded and sustained some debarking before the tornado dissipated northwest of Kirkland.

A 2-minute long video recording of the tornado in the Fairdale area exists which shows a near-death experience recorded by Clarence “Clem” Schultz (85), a man who was a resident of the area when the tornado began to form. The two fatalities of the disaster were Clem's wife, Geraldine “Geri” Schultz (67), and their neighbor, Jacklyn Klosa (69).

== See also ==
- Tornado outbreak of November 17, 2013
- Tornado outbreak of April 8–9, 1999
