= City and Town Hall (Rochelle, Illinois) =

- U.S. National Register of Historic Places
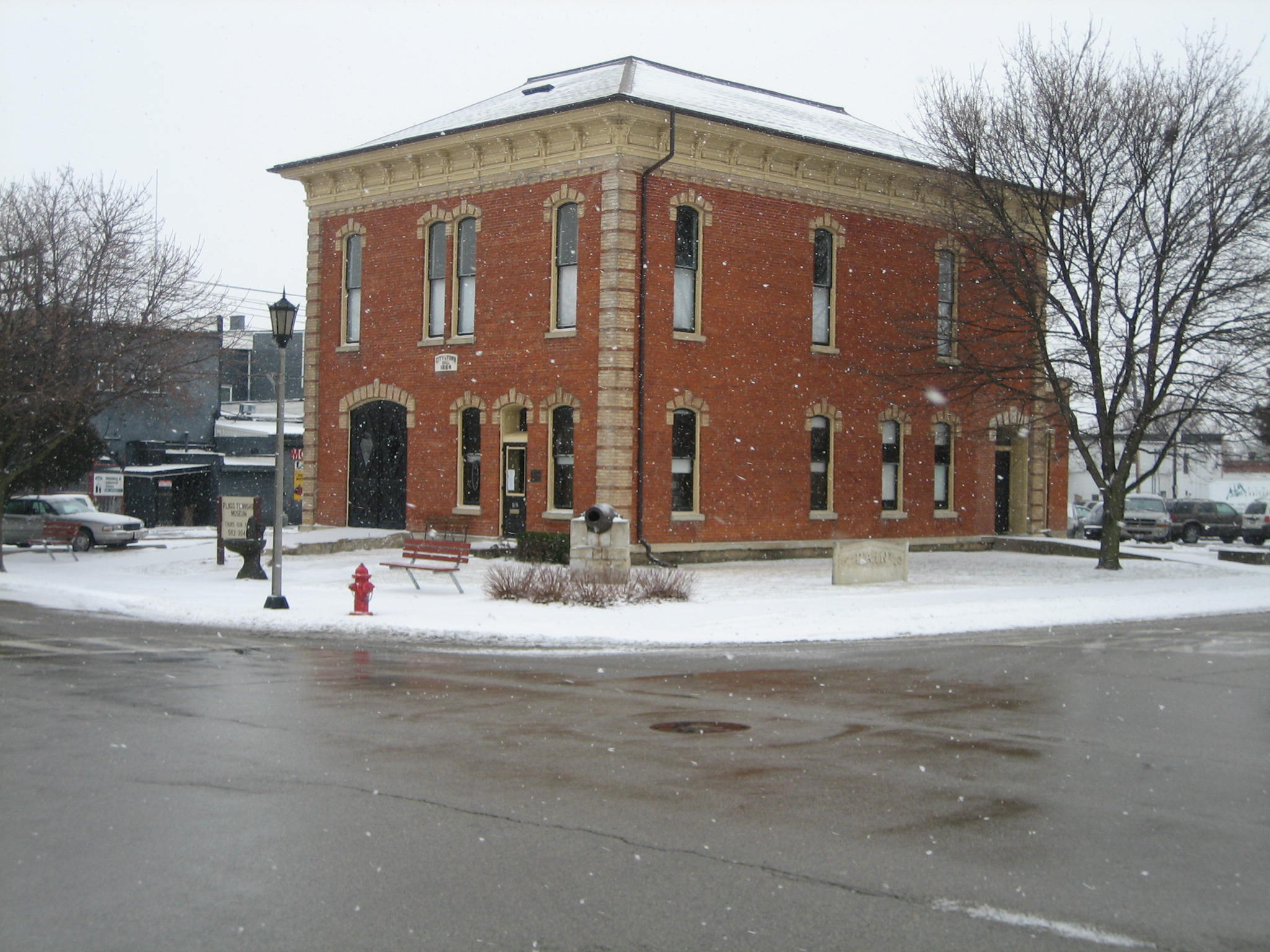
- Location: Junction of Fourth Avenue and Sixth Street, Rochelle, Ogle County, Illinois, USA
- Coordinates: 41°55′24″N 89°3′56″W
- Area: < 1-acre (4,000 m^{2})
- Built: 1884
- Architect: Bradley and Son, Sam J. Parker; John R. Steele (builder)
- Architectural style: Italianate
- NRHP reference No.: 92001006
- Added to NRHP: August 18, 1992

The City and Town Hall in downtown Rochelle, Ogle County, Illinois, United States, operates as the township history museum, holding a number of static displays on local history. Historically it served as the headquarters for city and township government as well as holding the offices of numerous state, local and national entities. The building was erected in 1884 following an 18-year disagreement about the structure's cost between the city of Rochelle and Flagg Township.

The two-story Italianate structure features several decorative elements and an 1863 Civil War cannon on its lawn. City and Town Hall has been listed on the U.S. National Register of Historic Places since 1992. The structure was designed by Bradley and Son, a Rockford firm, with input from a Rochelle alderman. In 1968 the building was saved from demolition upon the founding of the Flagg Township Historical Society.

The building currently houses the historical society's Flagg Township Museum, with artifacts and exhibits about the area's history.

== History ==
Though the City and Town Hall's construction occurred in 1884, its history began 18 years earlier, in 1866. That year, the Flagg Township levied a township tax totaling US$3,000 for the purpose of constructing a township building. The project was to be a joint venture between Flagg Township and the city of Rochelle; the city was to provide an additional $3,000 to finance construction. Disagreements over the project eventually led to the city of Rochelle's refusal to pay its share and, thus, construction was delayed indefinitely. The city specifically objected to the cost of the structure the township wanted. In 1869 the township purchased two more lots adjacent the future site of City and Town Hall; the total cost for the two lots was $2,000.

In 1884 the city of Rochelle and the Flagg Township came to an agreement and cooperated to erect the City and Town Hall. John R. Steele, a local contractor, was hired to construct the building from local, red brick at a cost of $6,200. The building became the center for city politics in the small northern Illinois city of Rochelle and the city council made important decisions within its walls regarding the city throughout the last decades of the 19th century.

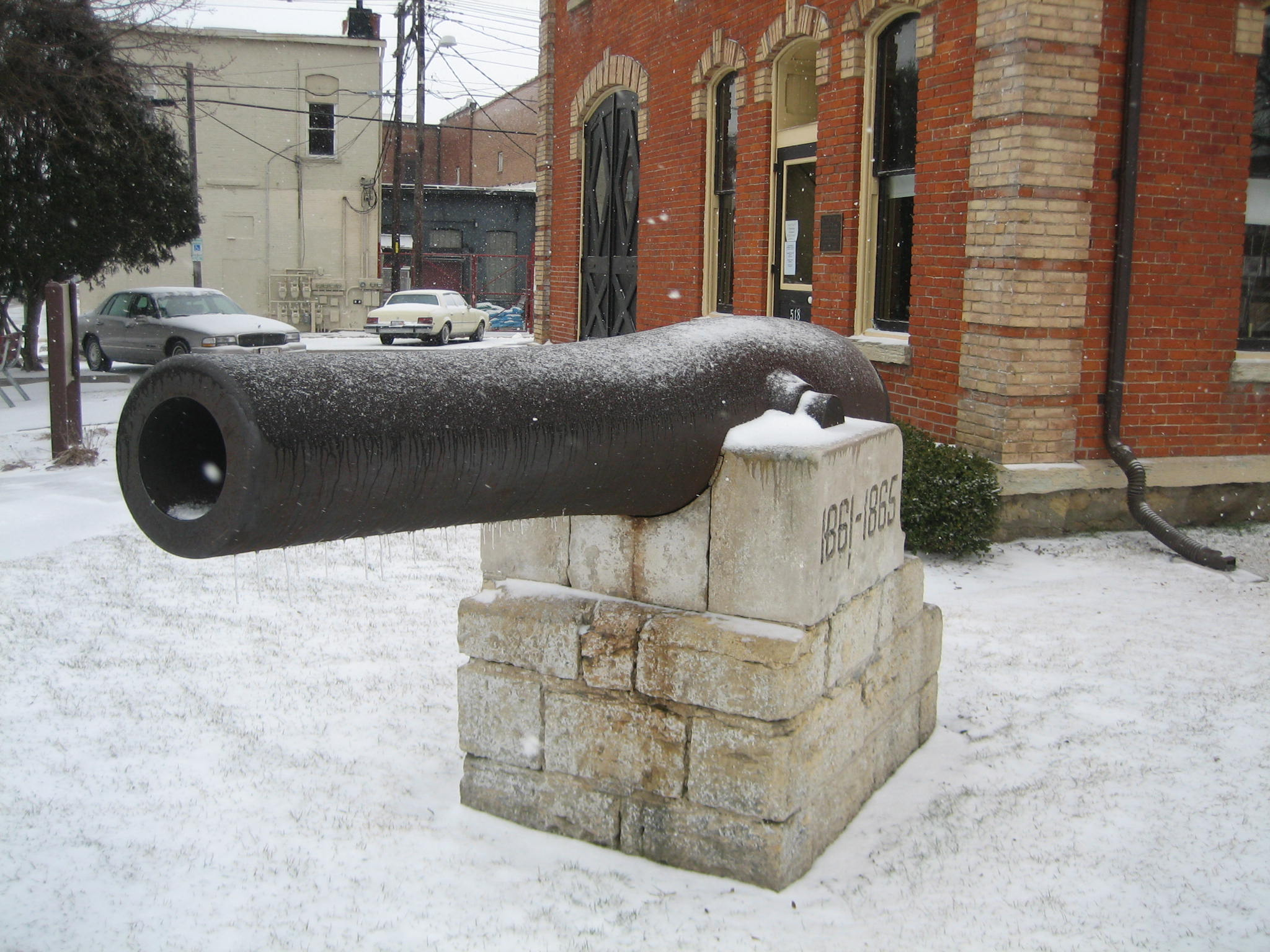
The 1863 Civil War cannon was placed by local Civil War veterans in 1899.

Some of the early decisions regarded city sidewalks and, in 1888, the creation of a fire district. Many meetings regarding the fire district and its boundaries were held at the City and Town Hall. Other early issues were the local liquor and saloon ordinance and the card playing and gambling ordinance. Election day in Rochelle and official polling places were established in 1885, both decisions were made within the walls of the City and Town Hall. In 1893 a lighting system for Rochelle's Washington Street was decided upon in the building. Local Civil War veterans had an 1863 Civil War cannon and 20 cannon balls placed in front of the City and Town Hall in 1899. The pyramid-shaped stack of cannonballs are no longer extant but the cannon remains on the corner of the lot.

From 1884 to 1968 both the city of Rochelle and Flagg Township used the building for its intended function. The Rochelle City Council chambers were located in the building for the entire period 1884–1968, as were the township meeting room and township board room. Other city and township offices were located in the building during that time span as well, of those the city clerk's, the town clerk's, the township supervisor's and the city manager's office occupied space in the building for the entire period spanning the years 1884–1968. The building also housed a "court room" during that period.

In 1968 the Flagg Township Historical Society took over the property. Under the direction of the historical society's founder, Franklin Kruger, the building was saved from demolition; a project which resulted in the foundation of the historical society. The building is currently being used as the Flagg Township Museum.

== Architecture ==
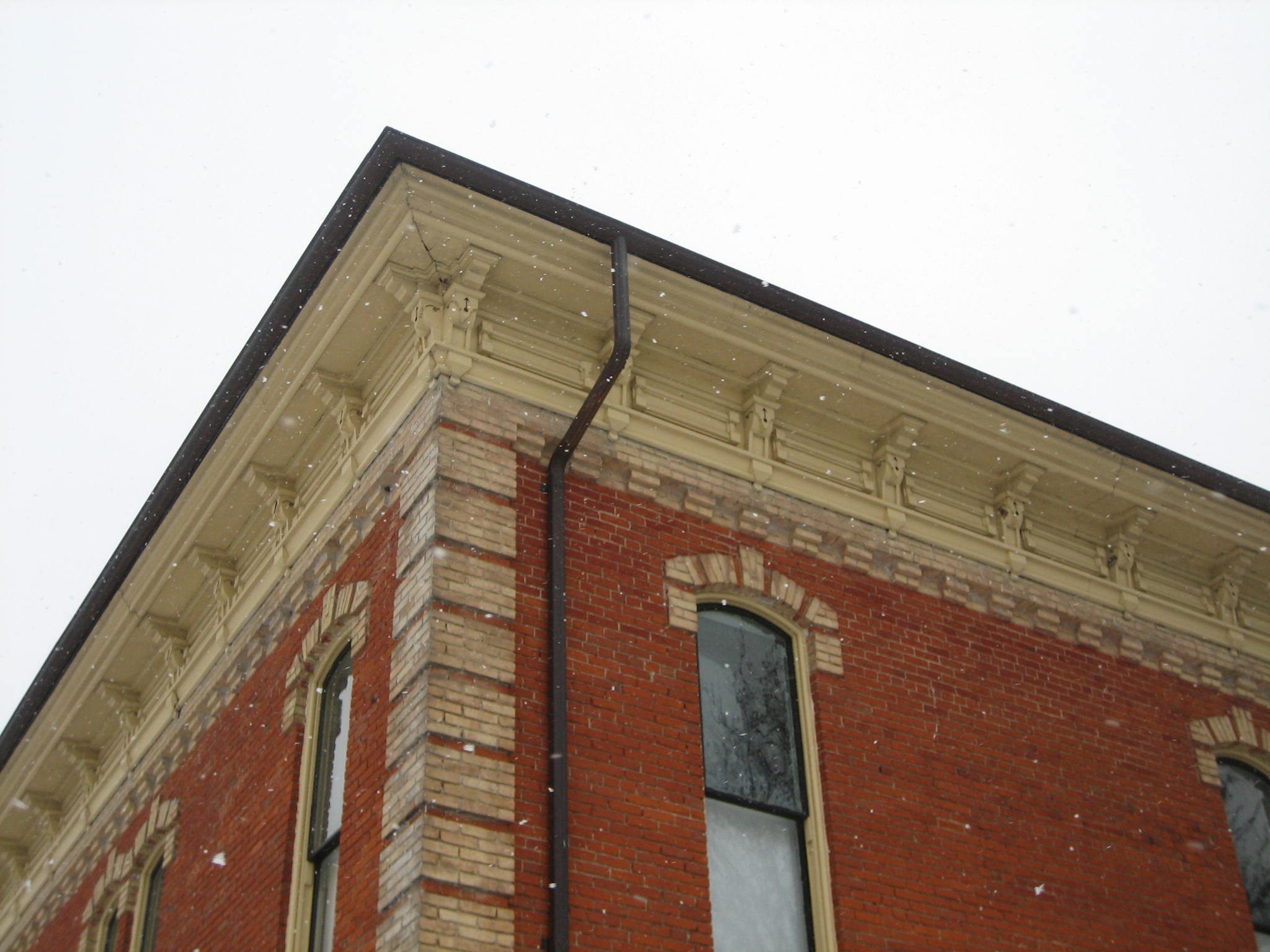
Detail of quoins, brackets and eaves on a snowy day in 2007.

The building is cast in the Italianate style and was designed by Bradley and Son of Rockford, Illinois. The building's design was based on a sketch by Rochelle alderman Sam J. Parker. The two-story rectangular building is constructed from soft, red local bricks. All four elevations have decorative metal brackets and a brick entablature with dentils beneath the metal eaves. Each of the exterior corners of the building are adorned with white brick quoins. The City and Town Hall's original hip roof was metal, it has since been replaced with asphalt roofing materials.

The first floor's north facade is adorned with two double-hung windows with projecting segmented arch crowns and stone sills. Also on the north facade is the original main public entry door and an arched transom window. The window and door treatments throughout the exterior are similar to those found on the first floor's north facade. The fire station doors, which were replaced after the fire station first moved from the building in 1931 and again in 1954, were eventually restored.

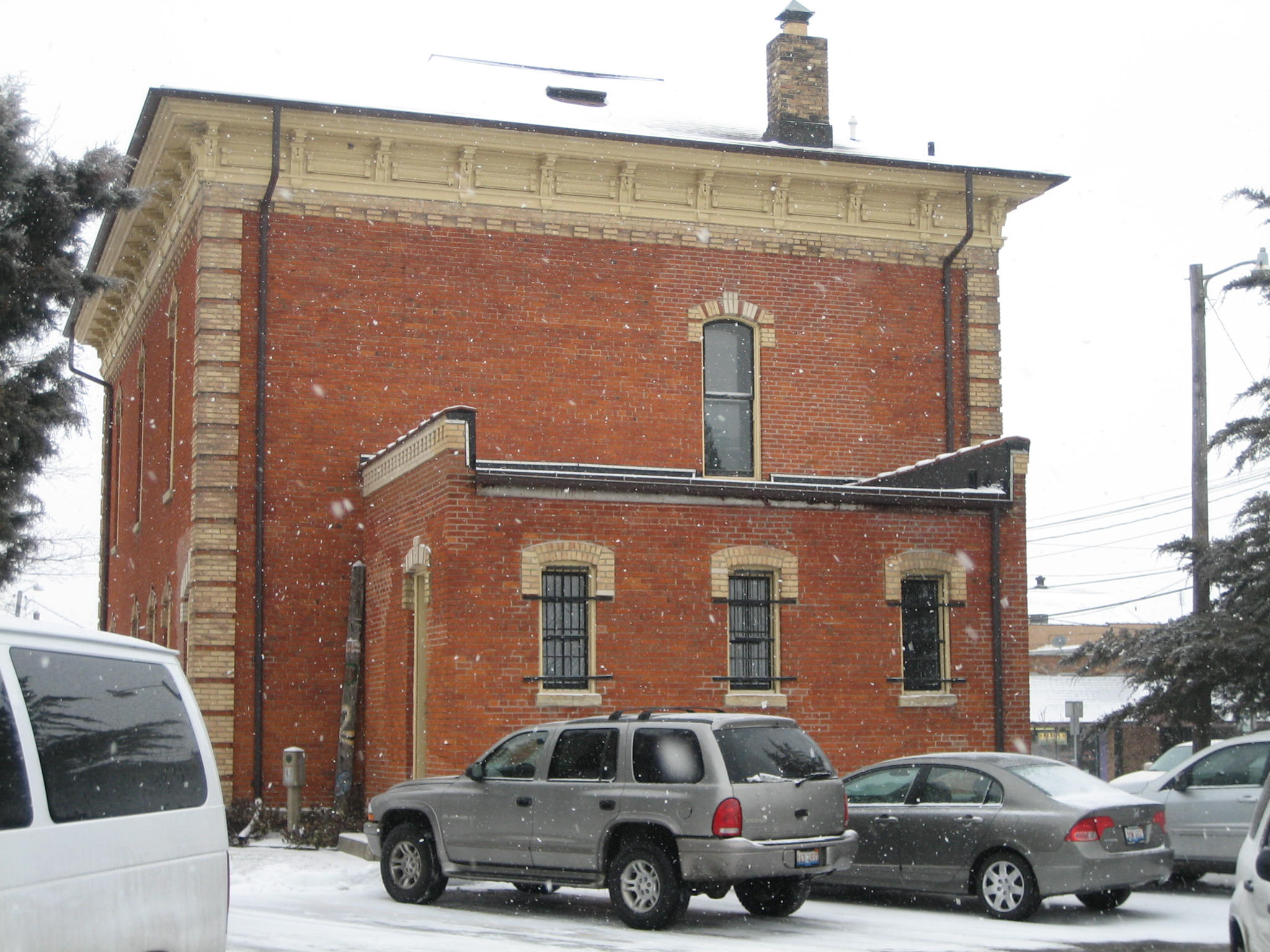
The men's jail building has many elements which mimic the two-story structure it is attached to.

On the rear (south) facade is an attached one story structure that housed the men's jail cells. On its west facade the original steel and wood door is still extant and on its south facade there are three windows complete with metal bars. All of the jail building's windows and doors feature arched brick crowns, a theme repeating from the two-story portion of the structure. While the brick entablature and dentil work both reflect the main two-story building, the jail building lacks the overhanging eaves and brackets. The rear elevation of the main building has one second floor window.

The original first floor layout contained room for the police station, fire station and, in 1891, the library. The building's vault was, and is, located near-center of the first floor. The original fire station occupied the entire east half of the building. At the rear (south) elevation is a one-story attached structure with its own entrance. It housed the jail cells in the original building and two cells are still intact. The entire second floor in the original 1884 floor plan was occupied by a meeting room save space for two small closets and the stairwell.

== Significance ==
The City and Town Hall is most significant for its use as a public, governmental building. The period of greatest significance for the City and Town Hall is 1885–1942, between those years the building housed numerous governmental and political entities, at the local, state and national levels. Besides serving as the Rochelle City Council chambers from 1884 to 1968, the building housed many entities including: the fire station (1884–1930), police station and jail (1884–1931), township board and meeting rooms (1884–1968), and the library (1891–1912). Offices in the building have been utilized by a mayor, a federal marshal, a driver's license examining facility, a Social Security office, the Works Progress Administration office, probation officers and the unemployment office, among others.

In 1972, the Illinois Historic Sites Survey Inventory cited the building for its significance in two areas, architecture and education. The May 1972 survey form stated that its use as a public building from 1884 to 1970 and its current use as a museum justified its significance in these areas.

== See also ==
- Flagg Township Public Library
- William H. Holcomb House
