= RPJ =

RPJ may refer to:

- Rajpura Junction railway station (Indian Railways station code), Punjab, India
- Rochelle Municipal Airport (FAA LID code), Illinois, US
