= Franklin Township, DeKalb County, Illinois =

Franklin Township
- Township
- Location in DeKalb County

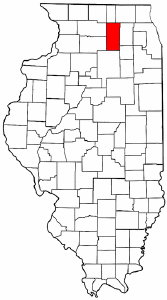
- DeKalb County's location in Illinois
- Coordinates: 42°06′31″N 88°52′55″W
- Country: United States
- State: Illinois
- County: DeKalb
- Established: November 6, 1849

Area
  - Total: 36.25 sq mi (93.9 km^{2})
  - Land: 35.87 sq mi (92.9 km^{2})
  - Water: 0.38 sq mi (0.98 km^{2}) 1.04%
- Elevation: 791 ft (241 m)

Population (2020)
  - Total: 2,231
  - Density: 62.20/sq mi (24.01/km^{2})
- Time zone: UTC-6 (CST)
  - Summer (DST): UTC-5 (CDT)
- ZIP codes: 60145, 60146
- FIPS code: 17-037-27650

Franklin Township is one of nineteen townships in DeKalb County, Illinois, USA. As of the 2020 census, its population was 2,231 and it contained 917 housing units.

== Geography ==
According to the 2021 census gazetteer files, Franklin Township has a total area of 36.25 square miles (93.89 km^{2}), of which 35.87 square miles (92.90 km^{2}) (or 98.96%) is land and 0.38 square miles (0.98 km^{2}) (or 1.04%) is water.

=== Cities, towns, villages ===
- Kirkland (mostly)

=== Unincorporated towns ===
- Fairdale at 42.100025°N 88.932876°W

=== Cemeteries ===
- Charter Oak
- Hick's Mill
- Maple
- Pine Hill

=== Airports and landing strips ===
- Harold Bunger Airport

== Demographics ==
As of the 2020 census there were 2,231 people, 929 households, and 622 families residing in the township. The population density was 61.55 inhabitants per square mile (23.76/km^{2}). There were 917 housing units at an average density of 25.30 per square mile (9.77/km^{2}). The racial makeup of the township was 87.54% White, 0.72% African American, 0.45% Native American, 0.13% Asian, 0.09% Pacific Islander, 3.23% from other races, and 7.84% from two or more races. Hispanic or Latino of any race were 9.14% of the population.

There were 929 households, out of which 35.50% had children under the age of 18 living with them, 52.42% were married couples living together, 9.15% had a female householder with no spouse present, and 33.05% were non-families. 26.60% of all households were made up of individuals, and 15.50% had someone living alone who was 65 years of age or older. The average household size was 2.42 and the average family size was 2.92.

The township's age distribution consisted of 20.2% under the age of 18, 10.2% from 18 to 24, 20% from 25 to 44, 30.2% from 45 to 64, and 19.6% who were 65 years of age or older. The median age was 44.8 years. For every 100 females, there were 105.9 males. For every 100 females age 18 and over, there were 115.5 males.

The median income for a household in the township was $62,371, and the median income for a family was $70,625. Males had a median income of $42,132 versus $37,125 for females. The per capita income for the township was $32,220. About 21.7% of families and 17.1% of the population were below the poverty line, including 23.6% of those under age 18 and 4.5% of those age 65 or over.

Historical population
Census	Pop.	Note	%±
1930	1,210		—
1940	1,266		4.6%
1950	1,418		12.0%
1960	1,673		18.0%
1970	1,950		16.6%
1980	1,891		−3.0%
1990	1,879		−0.6%
2000	2,003		6.6%
2010	2,502		24.9%
2020	2,231		−10.8%
US Decennial Census

== School districts ==
- Hiawatha Community Unit School District 426

== Political districts ==
- Illinois's 16th congressional district
- State House District 69
- State House District 70
- State Senate District 35
