= 2015 Rochelle–Fairdale tornado =

EF4 tornado in Illinois in 2015

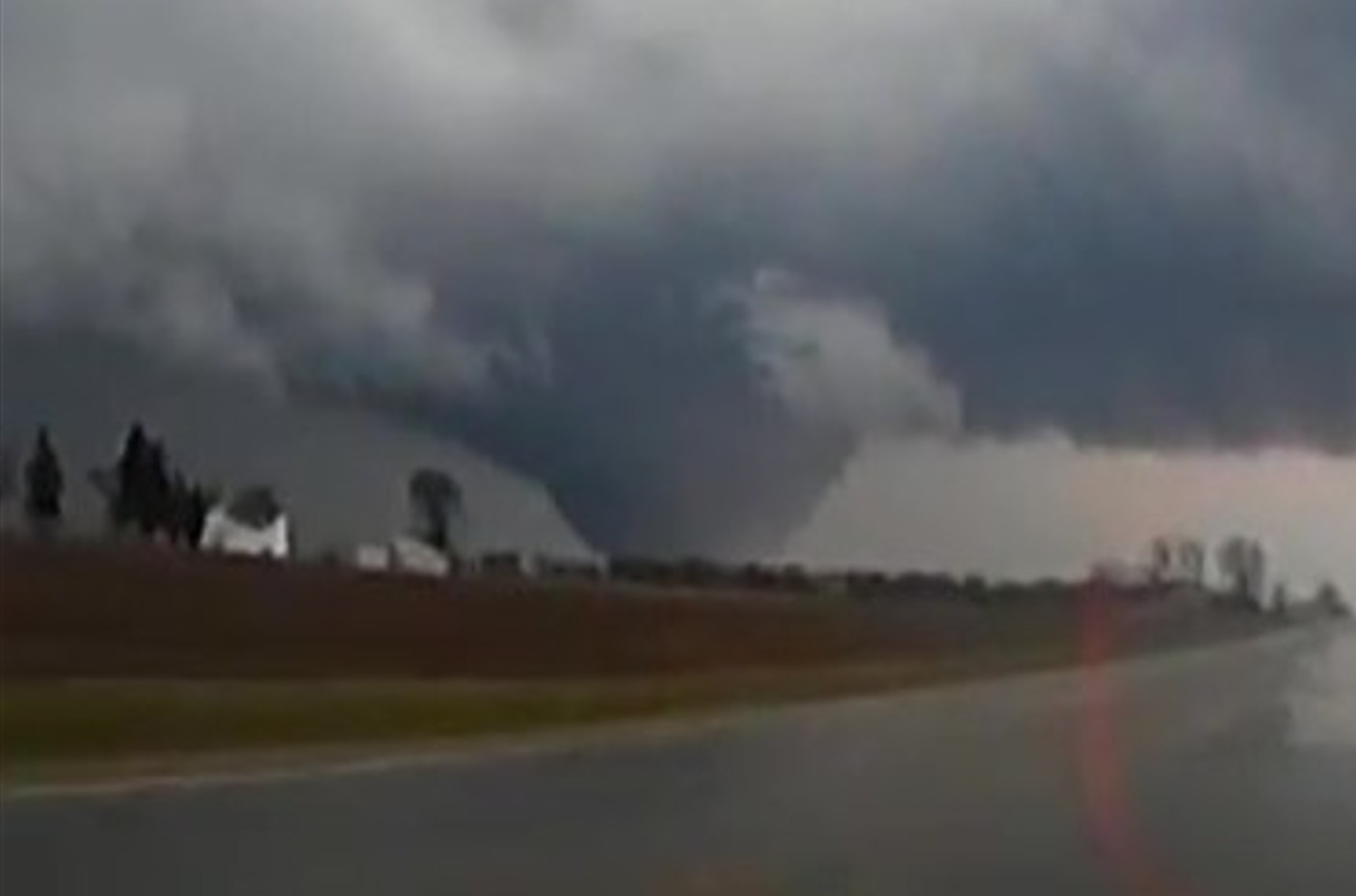
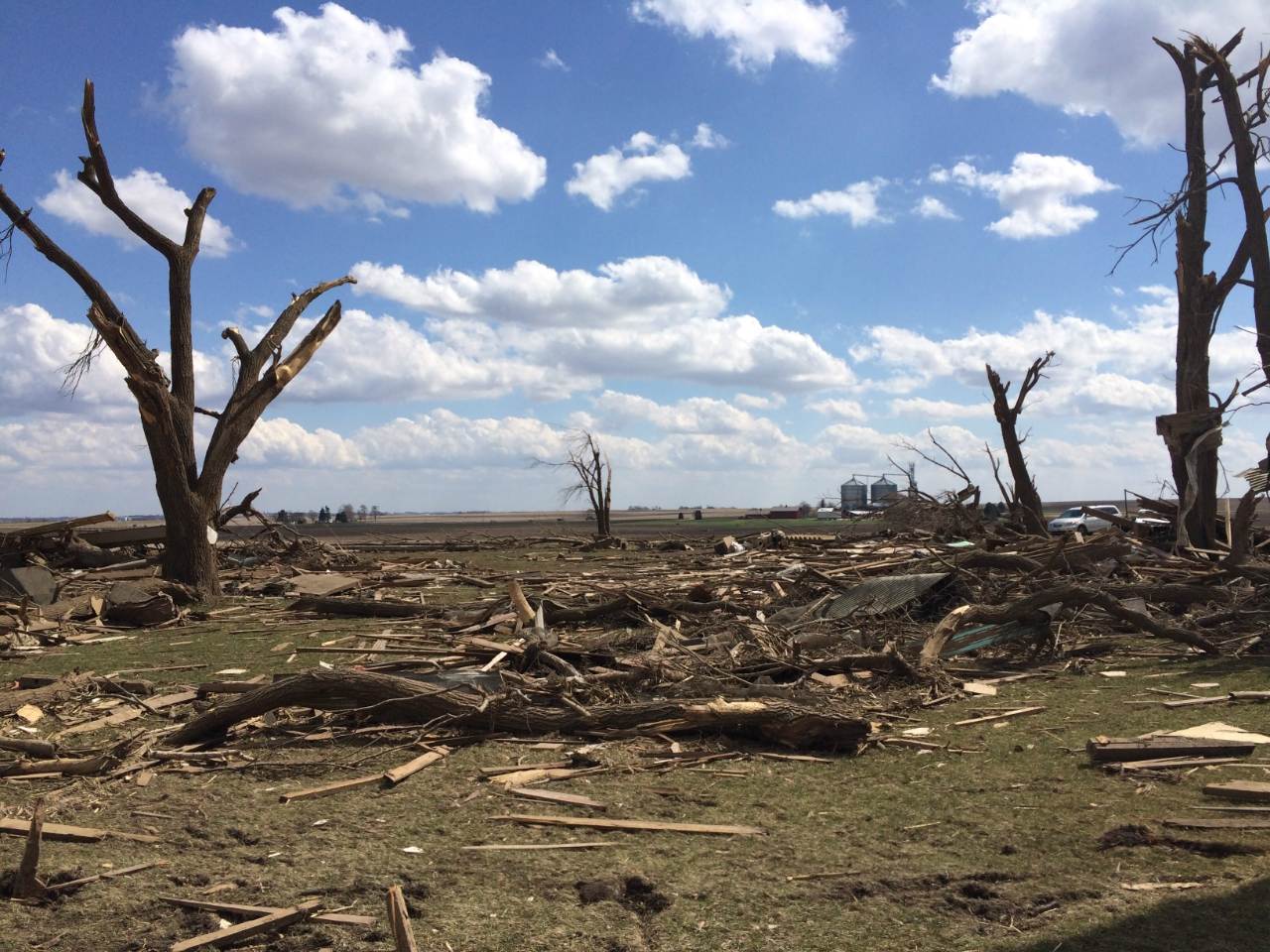
- Clockwise from top: A dashboard camera still of the tornado between Rochelle and Fairdale; A farmstead completely destroyed at high-end EF4 intensity, west of U.S. Route 51; A swept home west of Rochelle

Meteorological history
- Formed: April 9, 2015; 6:39 p.m. CDT (UTC–05:00)
- Dissipated: April 9, 2015; 7:20 p.m. CDT (UTC–05:00)
- Duration: 41 minutes

EF4 tornado
- on the Enhanced Fujita scale
- Max width: 700 yards (0.40 mi; 0.64 km)
- Path length: 30.14 miles (48.51 km)
- Highest winds: 200 mph (320 km/h)

Overall effects
- Fatalities: 2
- Injuries: 22
- Damage: $19 million (2015 USD) $25.8 million (2025 USD)
- Areas affected: Lee, Ogle, DeKalb, and Boone Counties, Illinois; particularly Rochelle and Fairdale
- Part of the Tornado outbreak of April 8–9, 2015 and Tornadoes of 2015

Throughout the evening hours of April 9, 2015, an extremely violent and long-lived multiple-vortex tornado tore through the communities near Rochelle and in Fairdale, Illinois. Part of a larger severe weather event that impacted the Central United States, the tornado first touched down in Lee County at 6:39 p.m. CDT (23:39 UTC). It progressed through the counties of Ogle, DeKalb, and Boone before finally dissipating at 7:20 p.m. CDT. Along the tornado's 30.14-mile (48.51 km) path, numerous structures were heavily damaged or destroyed, especially in the small town of Fairdale, where two fatalities and eleven injuries were recorded. A few well-constructed homes were swept completely away, indicative of peak winds near 200 mph (320 km/h), the upper bounds of an EF4 tornado. In the aftermath of the event, hundreds of citizens assisted in cleanup and recovery efforts. Economic losses from the tornado reached $19 million (equivalent to $26,000,000 in 2026).

== Meteorological synopsis ==
On April 4, 2015, the Storm Prediction Center (SPC) issued their Day 6 severe weather outlook, highlighting a substantial and widespread risk for severe weather from southeastern Oklahoma to northeastern Illinois valid for April 9. This threat area was maintained in the Day 5 outlook and narrowed to a corridor from southern Missouri into northern Illinois in the Day 4 outlook. On April 7, a Day 3 Enhanced risk was issued across most of Illinois, eastern Missouri, and small portions of adjacent states. No further changes to the threat level were made, although the Enhanced risk was significantly expanded late on April 8 to include portions of the southern Great Lakes, lower Ohio Valley, Ozark Plateau, and Ark-La-Tex region. Around midday on April 9, the SPC issued a 10% hatched tornado threat area across much of northern Illinois and small portions of nearby states, signifying the potential for several tornadoes, of which one or two had the potential to be strong (EF2 or stronger on the Enhanced Fujita scale).

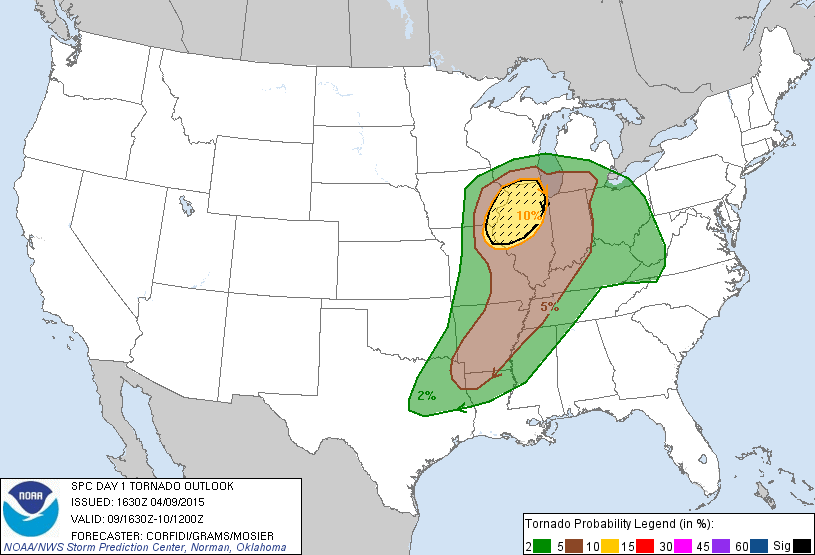
SPC's 16:30 UTC April 9 tornado outlook

The catalyst for the severe weather outbreak came as a positively tilted shortwave trough progressed across the central High Plains into the Great Plains and eventually through the western Great Lakes region. A weaker disturbance pushed from the Ozarks into the Northeastern United States, acting to strengthen southwesterly winds aloft across the risk area. At the surface, a weak area of low pressure initially centered over northeastern Kansas early on April 9 progressed steadily northeast while intensifying, reaching the trisection of Iowa, Wisconsin, and Illinois by late that evening. A cold front stemming from the low progressed eastward across the Mid-South, whereas an arching warm front slowly pushed northward across eastern Iowa and northern Illinois. Modest surface heating ahead of the cold front allowed mid-level Convective Available Potential Energy (CAPE) values to reach 1,000–1,500 J/kg, and a mass of rich moisture transported northward from the Gulf of Mexico pushed dewpoints into the lower 60s °F across the Enhanced risk area. Winds at 850 mb (4,781 ft) strengthened at or above 45 mph (72 km/h) below winds of 70 mph (110 km/h) at 700 m (2,300 ft), creating a favorable setup for sustained supercells. Although the overall directional component of low-level winds was expected to be less than ideal as a whole, a small area of southeasterly surface winds developed near the surface low in northern Illinois.

At 1:50 p.m. CDT (18:50 UTC), the SPC issued a tornado watch for northern and central Illinois, far northwestern Indiana, far southern Wisconsin, and portions of Lake Michigan. A 60% chance of two or more tornadoes was assessed across the watch box, with a 40% chance of at least one strong tornado. Isolated shower activity began forming across the region just prior to the issuance of watch, eventually growing into a line of strong to severe thunderstorms, including supercells. One such high-precipitation supercell was first severe warned at 6:11 p.m. CDT (23:11 UTC); the National Weather Service office in Chicago, Illinois, warned of winds up to 70 mph (110 km/h) and quarter- to golf ball-sized hail. The weather forecast office upgraded the severe thunderstorm warning to a tornado warning at 6:35 p.m. CDT (23:35 UTC), and four minutes later, trained storm spotters reported a damaging tornado north of Ashton. This was one of several tornadoes observed across the Central United States on April 8 and April 9.

== Tornado summary ==
The tornado first began at 6:39 p.m. CDT (23:39 UTC) on April 9, just northeast of Franklin Grove, Illinois. It touched down over a field, producing swirls in crops, before moving northeast, crossing IL 38 twice before causing EF1 damage to a Crest Foods plant. The tornado soon exited Lee County and entered Ogle County, inflicting EF1 damage to two farm outbuildings that were completely destroyed and EF0 damage to a similar structure that had a portion of its roof uplifted as it crossed IL 38 two more times. Intensifying to EF3 strength, much more severe damage was noted along South Skare Court as the tornado entered an area of semi-rural subdivisions to the northwest of Rochelle. A few homes in this area were destroyed at EF3 intensity, with other homes nearby sustaining EF2 damage. One large house had a room ripped off on its second floor, while a split-level home was almost completely leveled.

=== EF4 Intensity in Deer Creek subdivision ===
As the tornado crossed South Richard Road, it intensified to very high-end EF4 strength and inflicted catastrophic damage to several large homes as it impacted the Deer Creek subdivision. Well-built homes along South Richard Road and East Kuehl Court were leveled and swept from their foundations with debris strewn downwind. Several vehicles parked at these residences were moved some distance or tossed, and wind rowing of debris occurred. One house had its concrete walkway pulled a few inches from its original location, and notable scouring of lawn grass was observed in the subdivision. These structures were estimated to have been impacted by winds near 200 mph (320 km/h), the upper bound of an EF4 tornado. Continuing northeast, the tornado crossed the BNSF Aurora Subdivision and temporarily weakened as it approached and crossed another railway line, producing EF2 to EF3 damage. A few large barns and outbuildings were destroyed, two brick residences had their roofs ripped off, and another home had most of its walls collapsed. The tornado began to intensify again as it approached and crossed IL 251. A large restaurant and a residence had their exterior walls collapse in this area.

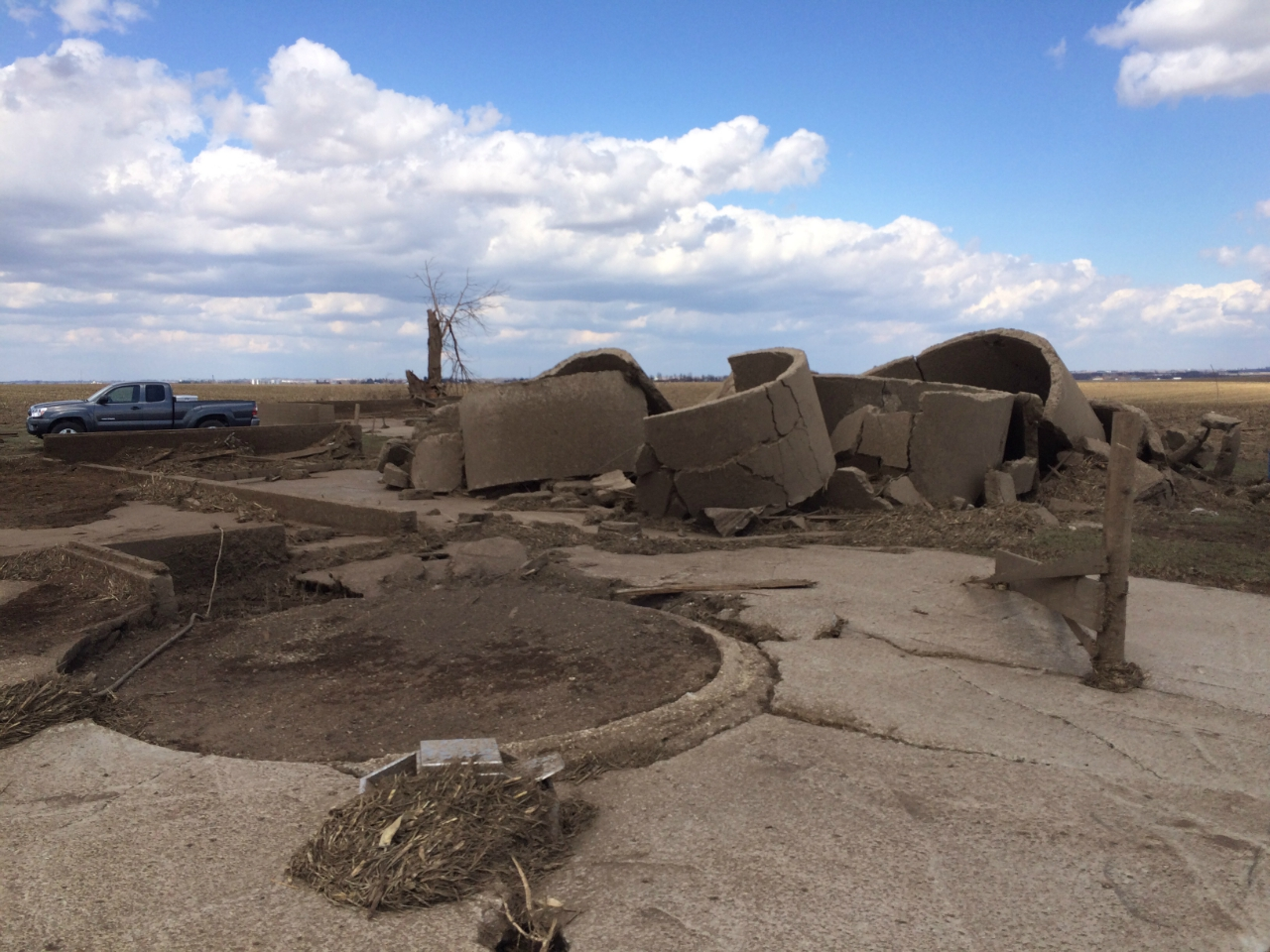
A reinforced concrete silo that was completely destroyed by the tornado.

Very high-end EF4 damage was again observed near the intersection of IL 64 and IL 251, where a row of five homes was completely leveled, two of which were swept away. Anchor bolts were again present at these residences, though the foundations were of cinder-block construction. Intense ground scouring was evident nearby, a car was thrown a full mile (1.6 km), and debris was wind-rowed long distances through fields in this area. Winds were again estimated at 200 mph (320 km/h), with the damage at this location again being near-EF5 intensity. Further to the northeast, the tornado inflicted high-end EF4 damage as a large farmstead was completely destroyed. A well-constructed barn was obliterated, and a 40 ft (12 m) reinforced concrete silo was reduced to a pile of rubble. A large farmhouse on the property was completely swept away, and nearby trees were severely stripped and debarked. The tornado weakened as it crossed North Moore Road, where a warehouse building had a collapse of its non-bearing exterior walls. One small barn or outbuilding had a collapse of exterior walls, while another had a few metal roof panels ripped off. After crossing I-39/US 51, it caused moderate roof damage to a large residence and tossed and rolled a heavy barn. The tornado continued to produce generally EF1 damage to trees and outbuildings before exiting Ogle County, and it was briefly accompanied by an EF0 satellite tornado that damaged crops to its southeast.

After entering DeKalb County, the large tornado crossed over a Canadian Pacific rail line and directly impacted the small community of Fairdale along IL 72. Approximately 71 homes sustained some degree of damage, including 13 that were destroyed. Several houses on the northwest side of town sustained damage consistent with an upper-end EF3 tornado, with all walls collapsed. A few houses that were nailed to the foundation—not bolted—were swept clean. Neighbors Geraldine Schultz and Jacklyn Klosa were both killed in their homes, and an additional 11 people were injured throughout the town, including Geraldine's husband, Clarence. Continuing northeast across Wheeler Road, one residence had a large portion of its roof ripped off, a second residence had its exterior walls collapsed, and a two-story 80-year-old well-constructed barn was destroyed. A large garage was destroyed and had its debris deposited well downstream, and significant denuding and debarking of trees was evident. Near the intersection of Irene Road and McNeal Road near Irene, a well-built seven-year-old house lost its second story and many exterior walls. A two-story, well-built barn with cinder block attachment was totally destroyed, and a nearby two-story, rebar-reinforced cinder block silo was ripped apart. Large farm equipment was tossed 0.25–0.5 mi (0.40–0.80 km), and convergent scouring of road pavement was noted in this area. After passing over rural terrain, the tornado finally dissipated at 7:20 p.m. CDT (00:20 UTC) over Cherry Valley Road, ending its 30.14 mi (48.51 km) and 41-minute path of destruction.

=== Clem Schultz video ===
A frame of the Clem Schultz footage, depicting the tornado approaching Fairdale at high-end EF3 intensity

The disaster was captured on a phone camera by Clarence "Clem" Schultz (85), who recorded the tornado from his home. He survived with a compressed broken vertebra, but his wife, Geraldine "Geri" Schultz (67), and their neighbor, Jacklyn Klosa (69), were killed. The Schultzes' dog, Missy, and Clem's phone with the footage were found unharmed after the disaster. The footage, which captured the tornado's approach and destruction of several houses (including the homes of Klosa and the Schultzes), was recovered and released online and in news broadcasts as a cautionary example.

== Aftermath ==
In the immediate wake of the tornado, The Salvation Army and American Red Cross set up temporary shelters for residents in Fairdale. The Rochelle Community Hospital was shifted into "disaster mode" to quickly handle the large number of casualties. Equipment and resources from over a dozen nearby fire departments aided in sifting through the remains of dozens of houses. More than 675 volunteers, coordinated by the Virginia faith-based nonprofit organization Operation Blessing, and countless residents from surrounding areas assisted in cleanup efforts. AmeriCorps coordinated their own operations beginning on April 12. Switchyard Bar and Grill in Rochelle hosted a donation drive to provide victims with new household items. Ogle County Sheriff Brian VanVickle and DeKalb County Sheriff Roger Scott set up a lost-and-found for residents to retrieve missing items. Workers from "Bees Designs" created and sold shirts in Rochelle, with all proceeds donated to help tornado victims. A check from near Rochelle was discovered approximately 80 mi (130 km) northeast in Racine, Wisconsin, a common occurrence with violent tornadoes. Widespread severe weather across northern Illinois prompted the cancellation of more than 850 flights at Chicago O'Hare International Airport. Governor Bruce Rauner declared DeKalb and Ogle counties as state disaster areas, freeing up a wide variety of resources for response efforts. Both the governor and Illinois U.S. Senator Mark Kirk toured the area. Total economic losses from the tornado reached $19 million (equivalent to $26,000,000 in 2025).

=== Possible EF5 intensity ===
On January 23, 2025, Anthony W. Lyza with the National Severe Storms Laboratory along with Harold E. Brooks and Makenzie J. Kroca with the University of Oklahoma’s School of Meteorology published a paper to the American Meteorological Society, where they stated the tornado in Rochelle was an "EF5 candidate" and opined that the EF5 starting wind speed should be 190 mph (310 km/h) instead of 201 mph (323 km/h).

== See also ==
- Weather of 2015
- List of North American tornadoes and tornado outbreaks
- Disagreements on the intensity of tornadoes
- List of F4 and EF4 tornadoes
  - List of F4 and EF4 tornadoes (2010–2019)
- 2013 Washington, Illinois tornado – A deadly EF4 tornado in central Illinois less than 2 years prior.
- 2025 Marion, Illinois tornado – A destructive EF4 tornado in southern Illinois over 10 years later.
