= SGSM Network =

SGSM Network, formerly known as The South Grand Senior Ministry, began in 2001 in partnership with some local South Saint Louis, Missouri Catholic parishes along the South Grand Avenue Corridor in St. Louis. SGSM started as a collaboration of only 2 churches, St. Stephen Protomarter and St. Cecilia, both located at the southernmost part of Grand Avenue. Though this organization started small, with church support and volunteers, the ministry was created to provide assistance and care to senior citizens throughout the Greater Saint Louis area.

To reflect this expansion, South Grand Senior Ministry became SGSM Network in 2008, and the organization has expanded throughout the St. Louis Metro area to include Grand Center, Northeast County Deanery, South County, South Grand, and the Lindenwood area (now independent). These different areas are referred to as clusters. The Network is meant to help organize religious communities and parishes of many different faiths to build active and solid partnerships with congregation members, area businesses, and neighbors so they can together provide volunteer opportunities and direct services that help to improve the quality of life for senior citizens.

There are five major components of the work the SGSM Network does throughout the metropolitan area. These include, Health, Transportation, Socialization, Case Management and minor home repair. The SGSM Network also sends out a bi-monthly newsletter to seniors members of all participating parishes and religious communities giving information to seniors about issues affecting them as well as promoting activities and seminars in their communities.

== South Grand Cluster ==
The South Grand Cluster is a strictly Catholic cluster, and currently includes the parishes of Immaculate Heart of Mary, Saint Anthony of Padua, Saint Cecilia, Saint Stephen Protomartyr, Saint John the Baptist, Saint Margaret of Scotland, and St. Pius V.

== South County Cluster ==
The South County Cluster is a strictly Catholic cluster, and currently includes the parishes of St. Matthias the Apostle, St. Bernadette, St. Andrew, and St. Mark.

== Grand Center Cluster ==
The Grand Center Cluster is an ecumenical group of churches and includes the faith communities St. Francis Xavier Catholic Parish, also known as College Church at St. Louis University. Christ in the City Lutheran Church, and Third Baptist Church.

== Northeast County Deanery Cluster ==
The Northeast Deanery is the largest cluster affiliated with the SGSM Network, is entirely Catholic. This cluster includes the parishes of Blessed Teresa of Calcutta, Holy Name of Jesus, Our Lady of Guadalupe, Sacred Heart, Saint Angela Merici, Our Lady of the Rosary, Saint Ferdinand, Saint Martin de Porres, Saint Norbert, Saint Rose Philippine Duchesne, and Saint Sabina.

== The Lindenwood Area Cluster ==
The Lindenwood Area Cluster was at one point a member of the SGSM Network, but is now a self-sustaining senior organization. This cluster includes to this day, Epiphany Catholic Church, Timothy Lutheran, Union United Methodist and Mount Tabor Community.

== Americorps VISTA ==
The SGSM Network is the umbrella site for Americorps VISTA in the St. Louis region. They also act as a host site for 10 VISTA positions.
