= Lindenwood =

Lindenwood may refer to a place in the United States:

- Lindenwood, Illinois
- Lindenwood, Queens, New York
- Lindenwood Cemetery, Fort Wayne, Indiana

In education:

- Lindenwood University in St. Charles, Missouri
- Lindenwood University – Belleville (2009–2020) in Belleville, Illinois. Now a satellite campus of Lindenwood University.

In other:

- "Lindenwood" or "linden wood", wood of the linden tree (genus Tilia)
