= Ralyn M. Hill =

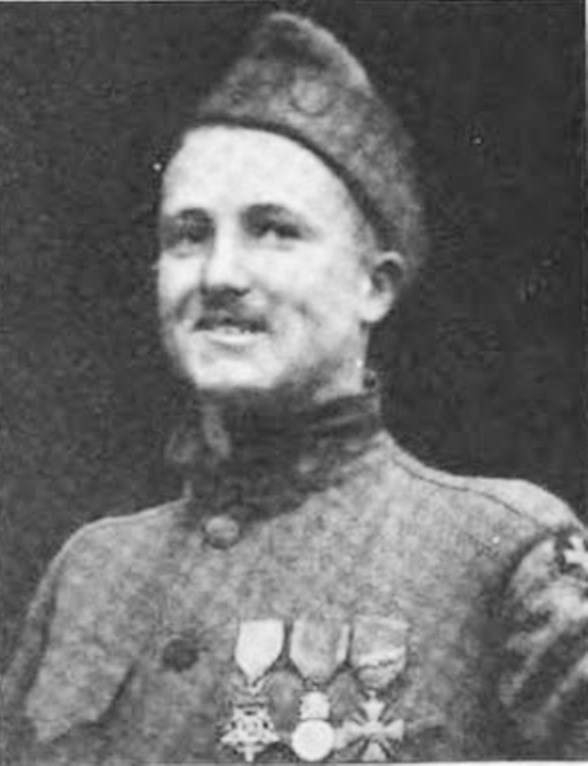
- Medal of Honor recipient
- Born: May 6, 1899; Lindenwood, Illinois, U.S.
- Died: March 25, 1977 (aged 77); Abilene, Kansas, U.S.
- Burial place: Abilene Cemetery, Abilene, Kansas
- Military career
- Allegiance: United States of America
- Branch: United States Army
- Rank: Sergeant
- Service number: 1381313
- Units: Company H, 129th Infantry Regiment (United States), 33d Division
- Conflicts: World War I
- Awards: Medal of Honor

Ralyn M. Hill (May 6, 1899 – March 25, 1977) was a soldier in the United States Army who received the Medal of Honor for his actions during World War I.

== Biography ==
Hill was born in Lindenwood, Illinois on May 6, 1899, and died March 25, 1977. He is buried in Abilene Cemetery, Abilene, Kansas.

== Medal of Honor citation ==
Rank and organization: Corporal, U.S. Army, Company H, 129th Infantry, 33d Division. Place and date: Near Donnevoux, France, 7 October 1918. Entered service at: Oregon, Ill. Born: 6 May 1899, Lindenwood, Ill. G.O. No.: 34, W.D., 1919.

Citation:

Seeing a French airplane fall out of control on the enemy side of the Meuse River with its pilot injured, Cpl. Hill voluntarily dashed across the footbridge to the side of the wounded man and, taking him on his back, started back to his lines. During the entire exploit he was subjected to murderous fire of enemy machineguns and artillery, but he successfully accomplished his mission and brought his man to a place of safety, a distance of several hundred yards.

== See also ==
- List of Medal of Honor recipients
- List of Medal of Honor recipients for World War I
