= Rochelle Railroad Park =

Park in Illinois, United States

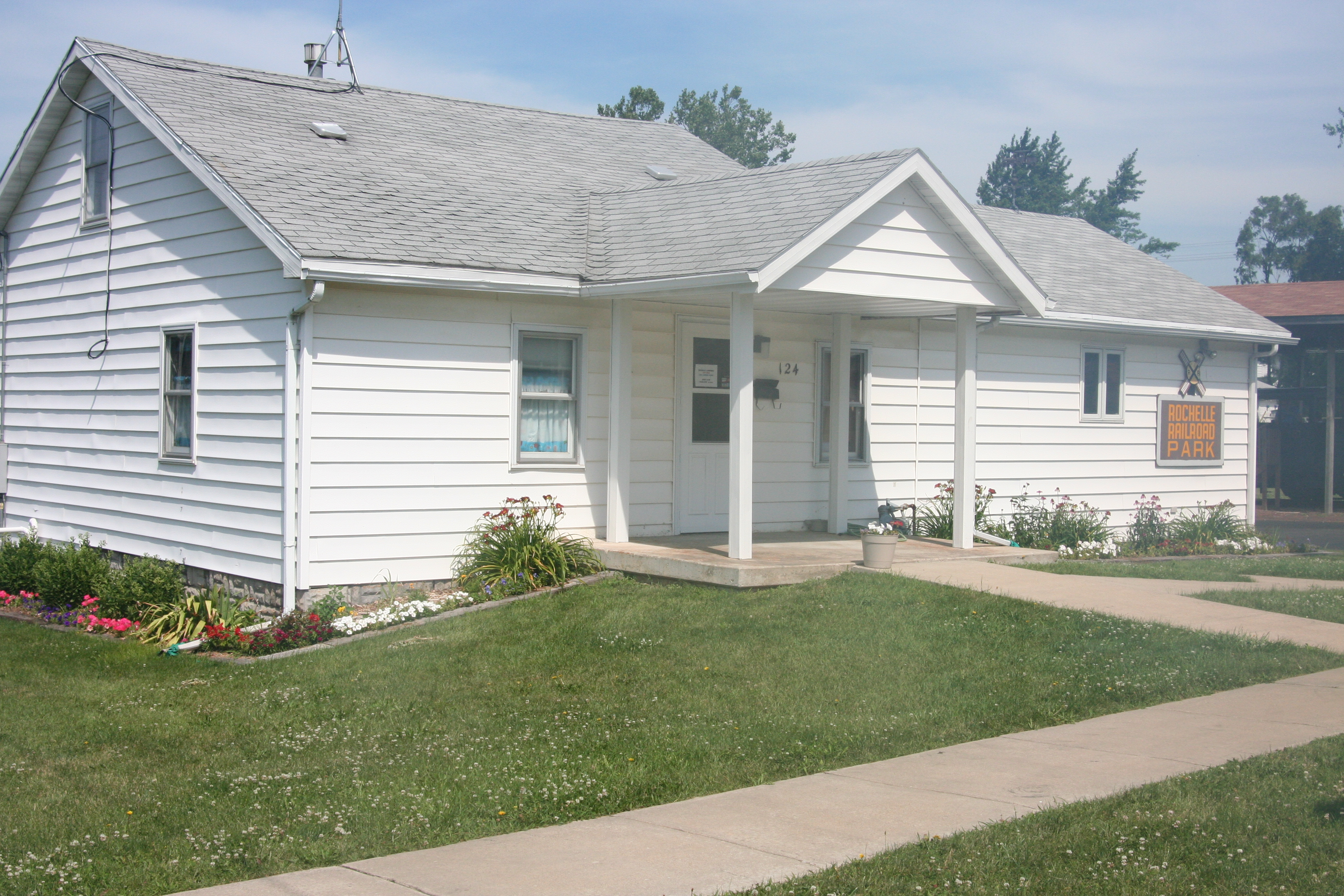
- The Rochelle Railroad Park Gift Shop
- Interactive map of Rochelle Railroad Park
- Location: Rochelle IL
- Coordinates: 41.9203°N 089.072°W
- Opened: August 30, 1998
- Operator: City of Rochelle IL
- Open: 24/7
- Awards: 1st Railfan Park in US
- Parking: Free
- Facilities: Restrooms, Gift shop, Free Wifi
- Website: Official Website

The Rochelle Railroad Park is a city park located in Rochelle, Illinois where railfans can safely view and photograph trains.

== Location ==
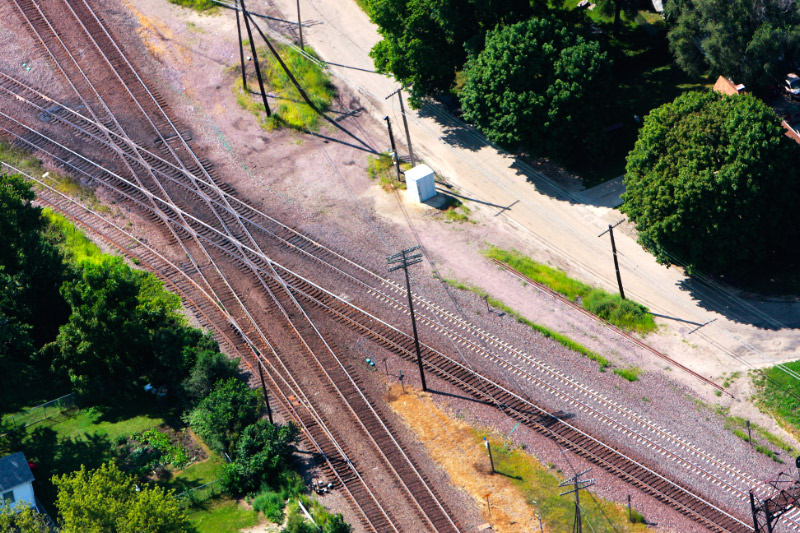
Rochelle's quad diamonds as seen from the air

The park is in the eastern quadrant of the double diamond crossing between the Union Pacific Railroad (UP) and BNSF Railway (BNSF) mainlines between Chicago and points west.

The two mainlines cross on the southwest side of Rochelle. The UP (formerly Chicago and North Western Railway) Geneva Subdivision travels through the crossing from the southwest to northeast, from Chicago towards Clinton, Iowa, and Omaha. The UP's Global III yard is about 1 mile southwest of the diamond. The BNSF (formerly Burlington Northern Railroad and before that, the Chicago, Burlington & Quincy Railroad) Aurora Subdivision travels the northwest to southeast corners, from Aurora Illinois to Savanna, Illinois and to the twin cities of Minneapolis-St Paul. This double mainline, four-track, diamond, known as NX Crossing, is at milepost 83.7 on the BNSF, and at 75.3 on the UP.

== History ==
Before the city of Rochelle built the park, railfans often parked just short of an interchange siding connecting the two railroads in the northern quadrant of the crossing. The interchange track connected the northern track of the eastern portion of the UP's mainline with the northern track of the western portion of the BNSF's mainline. While this parking location allowed railfans to see a great distance towards the west along UP's mainline, many vehicles were parked too close to the interchange track to be safe if a train used it. Additionally, there was no protection to keep trespassers off the tracks. The northern interchange track has since been removed although a longer interchange siding still exists on the South quadrant of the crossing.

In September 2024, Union Pacific's restored 4‑8‑8‑4 Big Boy 4014 visited Rochelle during its Midwest tour, making a public display stop at the park that drew thousands of railfans.

== Features ==
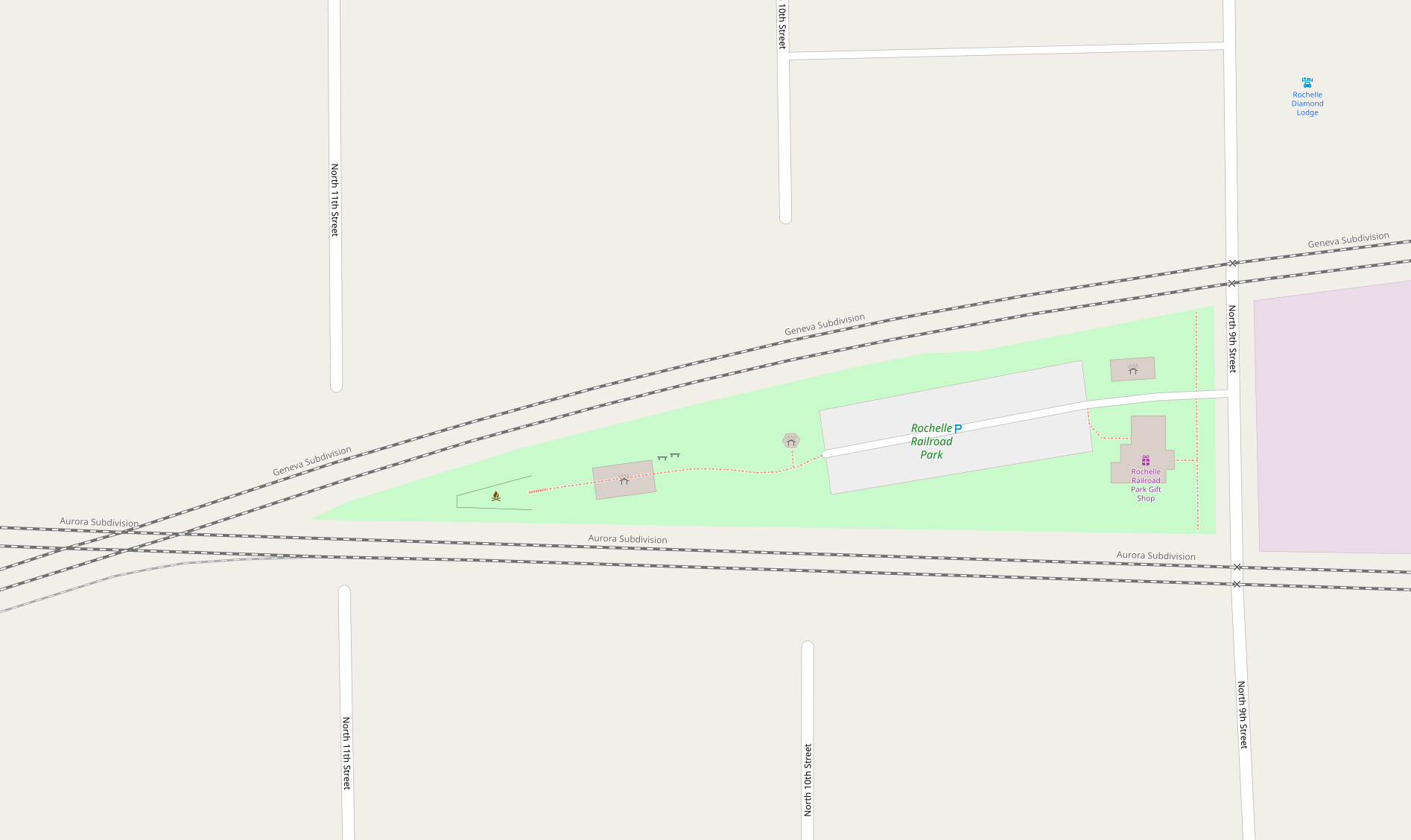
Map showing the layout of the park

The city chose the eastern quadrant of the crossing in which to build the park. Many factors went into the selection of the eastern quadrant, but by using it, the city was able to erect an elevated viewing platform with a gazebo-style roof, picnic tables, an area to build a re-creation of a hobo jungle, a display of strap rail track, a small preserved Whitcomb switching locomotive (manufactured by the Whitcomb Locomotive Works of Rochelle), and a paved parking lot. The amenities are further enhanced with public restrooms, vending machines, and a small model railroad shop.

Some of the more technical offerings at the park for railfans to enjoy include the following:

- A live railroad scanner set to monitor both UP and BNSF operational radio frequencies (speakers in the picnic/viewing platform) or on low power FM 106.9.
- Wi-Fi
- Two ATCS monitors showing a live view of the UP Geneva Sub (one in museum, one by back door visible to outside)
- A live internet-viewable webcam with audio atop the viewing platform's roof operated by Trains Magazine, EarthCam and Virtual Railfan.

Indicators that a train is approaching the park include the following:

- Eastbound - Both railroads have defect detectors just west of the crossing that signal train statuses over the radio
- Westbound - Grade crossing signals to the east of the park at N 9th Street will activate to protect the grade crossings although trains will no longer (since 2016) sound their horns due to Rochelle having a quiet zone.
