= The Hub Theater =

Movie theater in Rochelle, Illinois, US

Coordinates: 41.92329°N 89.06654°W

The Hub Theater is a movie theater in Rochelle, Illinois.

== History ==
Opened in 1931, it was designed by Elmer F. Behrns.

In the 1980s the theater was converted to a multiplex screening format.

In 2015, the vacant theater was purchased by Florida businessman Mike McCarty. As of 2016, the theater is undergoing a renovation and was expected to reopen in 2019.
