= Delos W. Baxter =

American lawyer and politician

Member of the Illinois Senate
- In office 1897–1901

Personal details
- Born: Delos Wirick Baxter; July 29, 1857 Rochelle, Illinois, U.S.
- Died: September 28, 1918 (aged 61) Rochelle, Illinois, U.S.
- Party: Republican
- Education: Iowa State University
- Occupation: Politician, attorney

Delos Wirick Baxter (July 29, 1857 – September 28, 1918) was an American lawyer and politician.

Baxter was born in Rochelle, Illinois and went to the Rochelle public schools. In 1881, Baxter graduated from the Iowa State University law school and was admitted to the Illinois bar. Baxter practiced law in Rochelle, Illinois and was also involved in the banking business. He served as mayor of Rochelle and as state's attorney for Ogle County, Illinois. Baxter was a Republican. Baxter served in the Illinois Senate from 1897 to 1901. Baxter died in Rochelle, Illinois.
