= Mount Selman, Texas =

- Unincorporated community
- Location within Texas Location within the United States
- Coordinates: 32°04′06″N 95°17′03″W
- Country: United States
- State: Texas
- County: Cherokee
- Elevation: 696 ft (212 m)
- Time zone: UTC-6 (Central (CST))
  - Summer (DST): UTC-5 (CDT)
- Area codes: 430, 903
- GNIS feature ID: 1342114

Mount Selman is an unincorporated community in Cherokee County, Texas, United States. According to the Handbook of Texas, the community had a population of 200 in 2000. It is located within the Tyler-Jacksonville combined statistical area.

== History ==
Mount Selman was established in 1884 along the Kansas and Gulf Short Line Railroad. Dr. R.D. Bone, J.W. Wade, and J.N. and W.T. McKee named the community Selman for Dr. James Selman, who donated land for the community. Its post office opened the same year as its creation and was renamed Mount Selman because there was another community named Selman elsewhere in the state. In 1892, Mount Selman had 125 residents, alongside a gristmill and gin, a Presbyterian church, a general store, a drugstore, dry goods, and grocery stores. The community became a shipping center along the railroad for peaches, plums, and tomatoes. Its population peaked at 500 in 1914, and the town began to decline after that point. It went down to 220 and had five businesses in the early 1950s, causing many of the remaining stores to close. The post office closed in 1973 while mail was sent from Bullard, and the population was estimated at 200 in 2000. It had several churches, a community center, and several scattered houses in 1990.

In 1986 and 1990, Mount Selman had two of the tallest structures standing higher than 400 meters: Pinnacle Towers Mount Selman for KETK-TV and KOOI and Media General Operations Tower Youngstown (see List of tallest structures).

On April 9, 2015, an EF-2 tornado struck Mount Selman, snapping and uprooting trees, damaging outbuildings, and removing the roof and collapsing a few exterior walls of a house.

== Geography ==
Mount Selman is located at the intersection of U.S. Route 69 and Farm to Market Road 177, 20 mi (32 km) north of Rusk in northern Cherokee County. It is also located 3 mi (4.8 km) north of Jacksonville.

== Education ==
Today, the community is served by the Jacksonville Independent School District.
