= Rochelle Municipal Airport =

Rochelle Municipal Airport Koritz Field
- IATA: none; ICAO: KRPJ; FAA LID: RPJ

Summary
- Airport type: Public
- Owner: City of Rochelle
- Serves: Rochelle, Illinois
- Time zone: UTC−06:00 (-6)
  - Summer (DST): UTC−05:00 (-5)
- Elevation AMSL: 781 ft / 238 m
- Coordinates: 41°53′35″N 89°04′42″W

Maps
- Location of Ogle County in Illinois

- Location of airport in Ogle County RPJ (the United States)

Runways
Direction	Length		Surface
Direction	ft	m	Surface
7/25	4,225	1,288	Asphalt

Statistics (2021)
- Aircraft operations: 12,000
- Based aircraft: 42
- Source: Federal Aviation Administration

Rochelle Municipal Airport (ICAO: KRPJ, FAA LID: RPJ), also known as Koritz Field, is a city-owned public-use airport located two nautical miles (2.3 mi; 3.7 km) south of the central business district of Rochelle, a city in Ogle County, Illinois, United States. It is included in the FAA's National Plan of Integrated Airport Systems for 2011–2015, which categorized it as a general aviation facility.

Although many U.S. airports use the same three-letter location identifier for the FAA and IATA, this facility is assigned RPJ by the FAA but has no designation from the IATA.

In 2022, the airport was home to an exhibit of old cars and aircraft to highlight the city's history with transportation development.

== Facilities and aircraft ==
Rochelle Municipal Airport covers an area of 113 acres (46 ha) at an elevation of 781 feet (238 m) above mean sea level. It has one runway, designated 7/25, which has an asphalt surface and measures 4,225 by 75 feet (1,288 by 23 m).

For the 12-month period ending August 31, 2021, the airport had 12,000 general aviation aircraft operations, an average of 33 per day. At that time there were 42 aircraft based at this airport: 32 single-engine airplanes, 9 ultralights, and 1 multi-engine airplane.

The airport received funds from the State of Illinois for facility upgrades during the COVID-19 pandemic.

== Accidents & incidents ==
- On August 21, 2017, a tailwheel-equipped Cessna 170 crashed while landing at the Rochelle Airport. The pilot reported that, during the landing touchdown, the wind shifted to a tailwind. The pilot attempted to go around but was unable to. Subsequently, the airplane drifted to the left of the runway, the right main landing gear collapsed, and the right wing impacted the ground. The probable cause of the accident was found to be the pilot's failure to maintain directional control during landing with a tailwind.

== See also ==
- List of airports in Illinois
