= Fairdale, Illinois =

- Unincorporated community
- Location of Fairdale within Illinois Fairdale, Illinois (the United States)
- Coordinates: 42°06′00″N 88°55′58″W
- Country: United States
- State: Illinois
- County: DeKalb
- Township: Franklin
- Established: 1875 or 1876

Area
  - Total: 0.23 sq mi (0.60 km^{2})
- Elevation: 781 ft (238 m)

Population (2012)
  - Total: 152
  - Density: 660/sq mi (260/km^{2})
- Time zone: UTC-6 (CST)
  - Summer (DST): UTC-5 (CDT)
- ZIP code: 60146
- Area codes: 815 and 779
- GNIS feature ID: 421795

Fairdale is an unincorporated community located in Franklin Township, in the northwestern corner of DeKalb County, Illinois, United States. It is located on the Iowa, Chicago and Eastern Railroad and on Illinois Route 72, approximately 4.8 miles (7.7 km) east of Exit 111 on Interstate 39.

== History ==
The community known today as Fairdale was platted in 1875 or 1876 (sources differ) and was centered on the property of farmer Henry Koch. The community's original name was Fielding, apparently named for a man named Albert Fielding. Early buildings in Fielding included Lewis Keith's general merchandise store, L.W. King's drug store, and a Methodist church. A post office was first established in the community in 1875 under the name Wallace (which was the name of the son of Henry Koch).

Eventually, the growth of the neighboring community of Kirkland outpaced the growth of Fielding (Fairdale), possibly due to Kirkland's coaling and watering station.

The name of the community (Fielding) and the name of the post office (Wallace) were both changed to Fairdale in late 1895 or early 1896. (The post office eventually closed in 1953.)

=== 2015 tornado ===
On April 9, 2015, the community was struck by an EF4 tornado, which caused two fatalities, numerous injuries, and significant damage to commercial and residential buildings. According to local authorities, 15 to 20 homes were destroyed, and almost all of the buildings in the town "sustained damage of some sort". Technical rescue teams from DeKalb and Rockford assisted in searching the collapsed buildings for survivors. The tornado had peak winds of 200 mph, the upper limit of an EF4. A man named Clarence "Clem" Schultz filmed a video of the tornado approaching his house, which ended up killing his wife Geraldine and their neighbor Jacklyn Klosa in the process. Schultz, along with 21 others, were injured during the tornado.

== Education ==
By 1881, a school had been established in Fielding (Fairdale). By the early 1900s, a two-year high school had opened, and in 1924 it became a four-year high school. The high school closed in 1945, but the school building continued to serve as an elementary school for the Kirkland School District until 1967. Since that time, the community has been part of what is now Hiawatha Community Unit School District 426, with most students attending schools in neighboring Kirkland. As of 2018, the former school building was a private residence.
