= Flagg Township Public Library =

- U.S. National Register of Historic Places
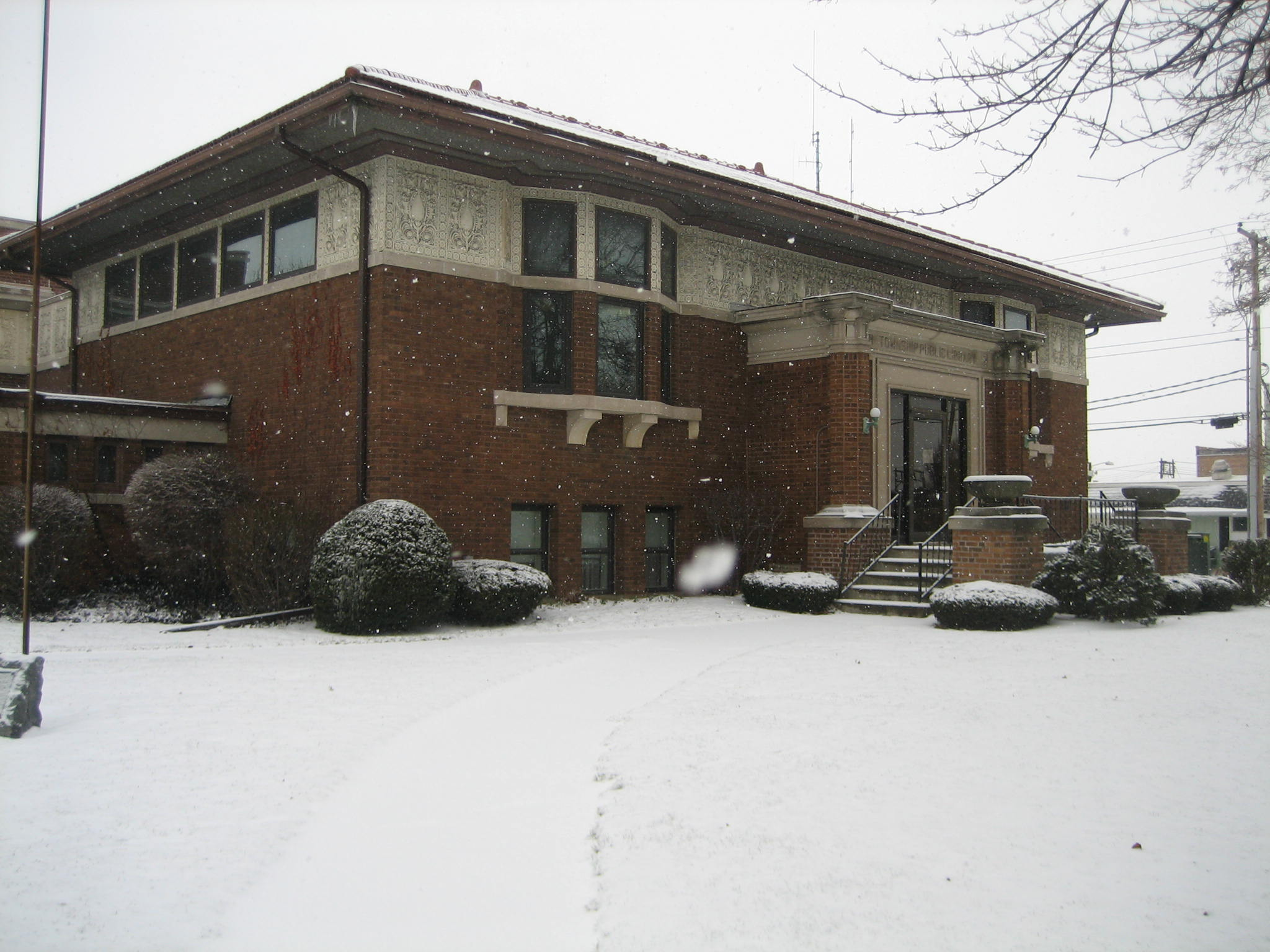
- The Rochelle Flagg Township Public Library.

- Location within Illinois Location within the United States
- Location: NE corner 7th St. at 4th Ave., Rochelle, Illinois
- Coordinates: 41°55′24″N 89°3′56″W
- Area: 1 acre (0.40 ha)
- Built: 1912
- Architect: Claude and Starck
- Architectural style: Prairie
- NRHP reference No.: 73000713
- Added to NRHP: October 25, 1973

Flagg Township Public Library is a library in Rochelle, Illinois. It is a Carnegie library, designed in 1912 by Claude and Starck. The library joined the National Register on October 25, 1973.

== History ==
As a Carnegie library Flagg Township Public Library was the beneficiary of a grant from Andrew Carnegie for its construction. Often smaller towns and rural areas would band together to petition Carnegie for a grant for a county or area library. Flagg Township Library is one such example of an Illinois township library obtained in this manner.

== Architecture ==
Flagg Township Public Library was built in 1912 and designed by the Madison, Wisconsin-based architectural firm of Claude and Starck. The library is an example of Prairie School. It has brick walls and a ceramic tile roof. Flagg Township Public Library is an example of a Carnegie Library.

== Significance ==
The Flagg Township Public Library was listed on the National Register of Historic Places on October 25, 1973, for its significance in the area of architecture.
