= William H. Holcomb House =

Historic house in Illinois, United States

- U.S. National Register of Historic Places
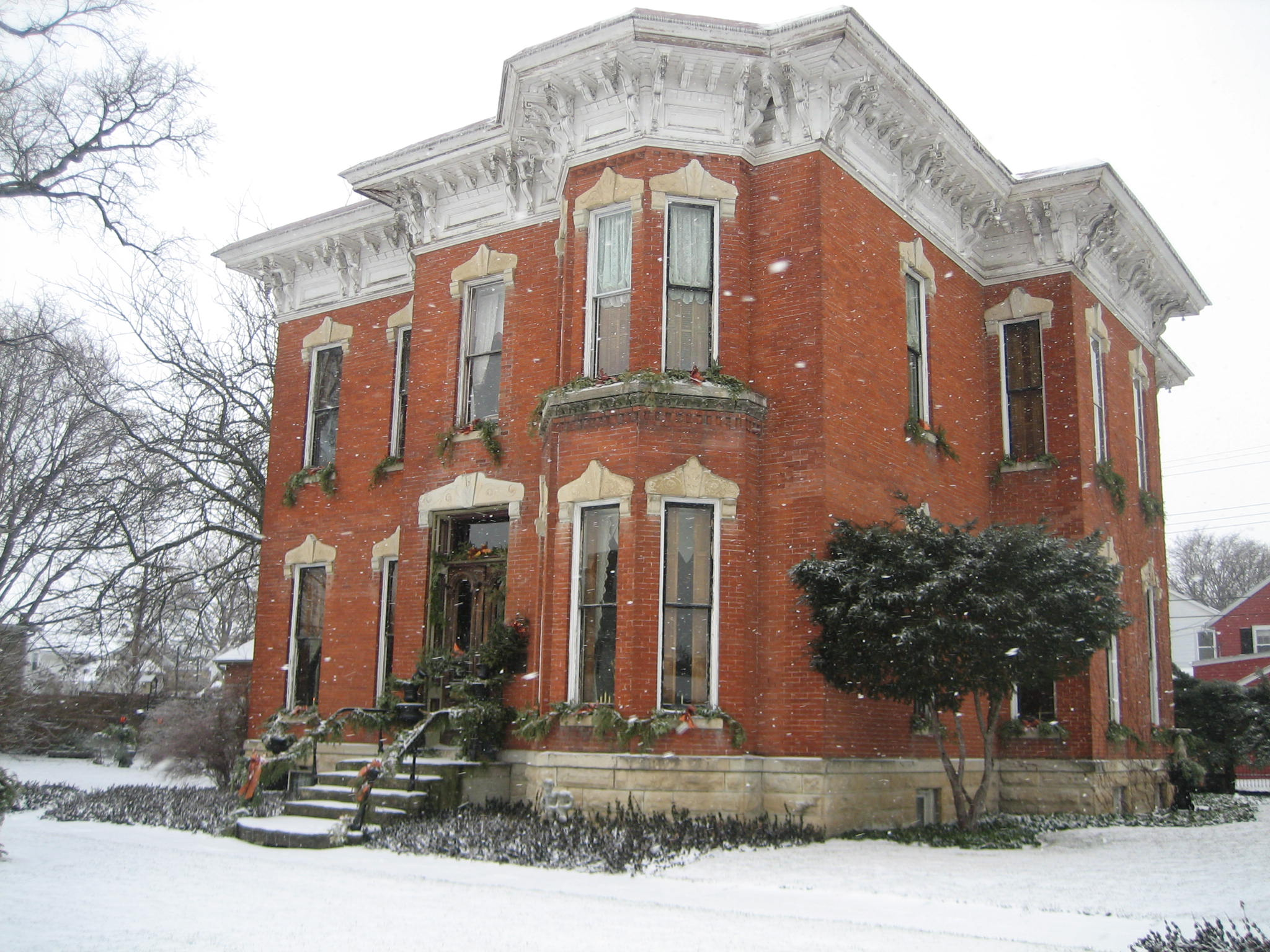
- The Italianate William H. Holcomb House in Rochelle, Illinois.

- Location within Illinois Location within the United States
- Location: 526 N. 7th St., Rochelle, Illinois
- Coordinates: 41°55′24″N 89°3′56″W
- Area: 1 acre (0.40 ha)
- Built: c. 1872
- Architectural style: Italianate
- NRHP reference No.: 73000714
- Added to NRHP: October 25, 1973

The William H. Holcomb House, also known by Carl Vandre House, is located in the Ogle County, Illinois city of Rochelle. An elegant Italianate structure, the Holcomb House has been listed on the National Register of Historic Places since 1973.

== Architecture ==
The William H. Holcomb House is a wood-frame brick house on a limestone foundation. The house was built in 1872 and is a significant example of Italianate style.

== Significance ==
The William H. Holcomb House was listed on the National Register of Historic Places on October 25, 1973, for its significance in the area of architecture.

William H. Holcomb (c. 1839–1908) was the general superintendent of the Chicago & Iowa Railroad and subsequently held the same position with the Chicago, Burlington & Northern Railway (part of the Chicago, Burlington and Quincy Railroad). In the 1880s he served as General Manager of the Oregon Railway and Navigation Company, and in 1893 was the General Manager of Transportation for the World's Columbian Exposition, in Chicago. He was also a vice-president and general manager with the Union Pacific Railroad.
