= Rochelle, Illinois =

- City
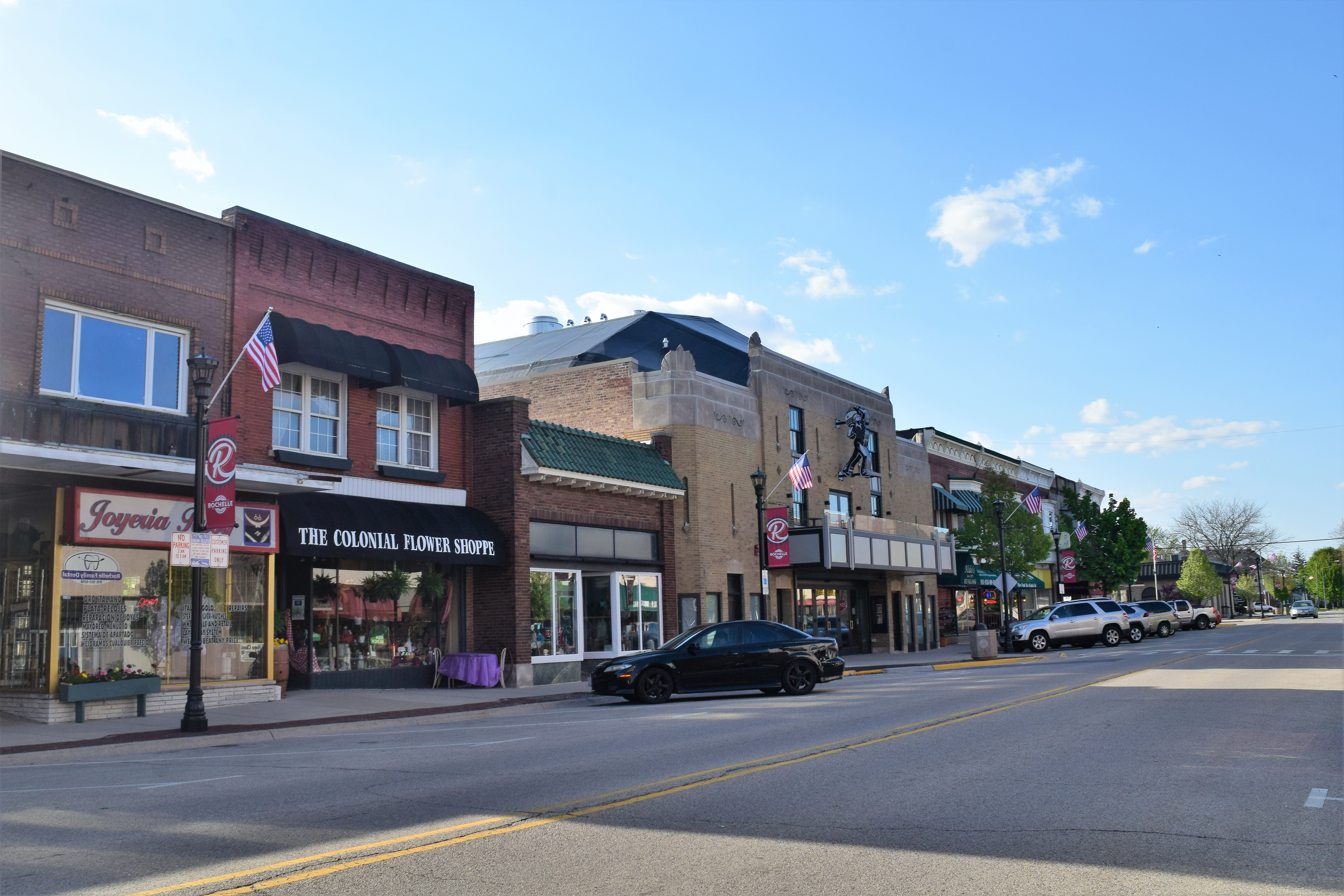
- Downtown Rochelle

- Seal
- Nickname: The Hub City
- Interactive map of Rochelle, Illinois
- Location within Illinois Location within the United States
- Coordinates: 41°54′24″N 89°01′52″W
- Country: United States
- State: Illinois
- Counties: Lee, Ogle
- Townships: Flagg, Dement, Alto, Reynolds

Area
  - Total: 13.42 sq mi (34.76 km^{2})
  - Land: 13.40 sq mi (34.71 km^{2})
  - Water: 0.019 sq mi (0.05 km^{2})
- Elevation: 781 ft (238 m)

Population (2020)
  - Total: 9,446
  - Density: 704.9/sq mi (272.16/km^{2})
- Time zone: UTC-6 (CST)
  - Summer (DST): UTC-5 (CDT)
- ZIP code: 61068, 61069
- Area code: 815
- FIPS code: 17-64746
- GNIS feature ID: 2396392
- Website: www.cityofrochelle.net

Rochelle is a city in Ogle and Lee counties, Illinois, United States. The population was 9,446 at the 2020 census. Rochelle is approximately 80 miles (130 km) west of Chicago and 25 miles (40 km) south of Rockford.

== History ==
Originally named "Lane", the town sits at the intersection of two rail lines, the Burlington Northern Santa Fe and the Union Pacific. Having a number of granaries holding corn, wheat and other crops for shipping eastward, the town was an important rail link for farmers.

After World War II, Rochelle grew, becoming a center for Swift Meat Packing and Del Monte canned vegetables such as asparagus, corn, green beans, and peas.

The community is home to the popular Rochelle Railroad Park where visitors from across the country come to watch passing trains at the intersection of the BNSF and Union Pacific Railroads.

On April 9, 2015, parts of the city suffered damage when an EF4 tornado struck near the outskirts of the town.

== Geography ==
Rochelle is located along the Kyte River (commonly, if inaccurately, known to most locals as "Kyte Creek"). It is also located near the junction of Interstates 39 and 88.

According to the 2021 census gazetteer files, Rochelle has a total area of 13.32 square miles (34.50 km^{2}), of which 13.30 square miles (34.45 km^{2}) (or 99.86%) is land and 0.02 square miles (0.05 km^{2}) (or 0.14%) is water. Located primarily in Ogle County, a portion extends into neighboring Lee County.

== Demographics ==
Historical population
| Census | Pop. | Note | %± |
|---|---|---|---|
| 1880 | 1,893 | | — |
| 1890 | 1,789 | | −5.5% |
| 1900 | 2,073 | | 15.9% |
| 1910 | 2,732 | | 31.8% |
| 1920 | 3,310 | | 21.2% |
| 1930 | 3,785 | | 14.4% |
| 1940 | 4,200 | | 11.0% |
| 1950 | 5,449 | | 29.7% |
| 1960 | 7,008 | | 28.6% |
| 1970 | 8,594 | | 22.6% |
| 1980 | 8,982 | | 4.5% |
| 1990 | 8,769 | | −2.4% |
| 2000 | 9,424 | | 7.5% |
| 2010 | 9,574 | | 1.6% |
| 2020 | 9,446 | | −1.3% |
U.S. Decennial Census; 2010 2020

=== Racial and ethnic composition ===
Rochelle city, Illinois – Racial and ethnic composition Note: the US Census treats Hispanic/Latino as an ethnic category. This table excludes Latinos from the racial categories and assigns them to a separate category. Hispanics/Latinos may be of any race.
| Race / Ethnicity (NH = Non-Hispanic) | Pop 2000 | Pop 2010 | Pop 2020 | % 2000 | % 2010 | % 2020 |
|---|---|---|---|---|---|---|
| White alone (NH) | 7,324 | 6,918 | 6,128 | 77.72% | 72.26% | 64.87% |
| Black or African American alone (NH) | 92 | 208 | 239 | 0.98% | 2.17% | 2.53% |
| Native American or Alaska Native alone (NH) | 19 | 21 | 20 | 0.20% | 0.22% | 0.21% |
| Asian alone (NH) | 83 | 65 | 73 | 0.88% | 0.68% | 0.77% |
| Native Hawaiian or Pacific Islander alone (NH) | 2 | 1 | 0 | 0.02% | 0.01% | 0.00% |
| Other race alone (NH) | 6 | 0 | 15 | 0.06% | 0.00% | 0.16% |
| Mixed race or Multiracial (NH) | 92 | 107 | 323 | 0.98% | 1.12% | 3.42% |
| Hispanic or Latino (any race) | 1,806 | 2,254 | 2,648 | 19.16% | 23.54% | 28.03% |
| Total | 9,424 | 9,574 | 9,446 | 100.00% | 100.00% | 100.00% |

=== 2020 census ===
As of the 2020 census, Rochelle had a population of 9,446. The median age was 37.1 years. 23.2% of residents were under the age of 18 and 16.5% of residents were 65 years of age or older. For every 100 females there were 98.2 males, and for every 100 females age 18 and over there were 94.6 males age 18 and over.

98.6% of residents lived in urban areas, while 1.4% lived in rural areas.

There were 3,853 households in Rochelle, including 2,256 families. Of all households, 29.6% had children under the age of 18 living in them, 40.3% were married-couple households, 21.7% were households with a male householder and no spouse or partner present, and 28.4% were households with a female householder and no spouse or partner present. About 33.6% of all households were made up of individuals and 13.7% had someone living alone who was 65 years of age or older.

There were 4,175 housing units, of which 7.7% were vacant. The homeowner vacancy rate was 2.3% and the rental vacancy rate was 6.9%.

=== Income and poverty ===
The median income for a household in the city was $49,413, and the median income for a family was $61,276. Males had a median income of $40,784 versus $27,012 for females. The per capita income for the city was $26,469. About 5.8% of families and 7.6% of the population were below the poverty line, including 4.2% of those under age 18 and 15.8% of those age 65 or over.

== Economy ==
Whitcomb Locomotive Works, founded by George Dexter Whitcomb, manufactured industrial locomotives as well as the Partin Palmer automobile, in Rochelle.

Union Pacific's Global III Intermodal Facility, completed in 2003, was Union Pacific's largest intermodal facility upon completion. It closed in 2019.

The Illinois River Energy ethanol plant is located in Rochelle.

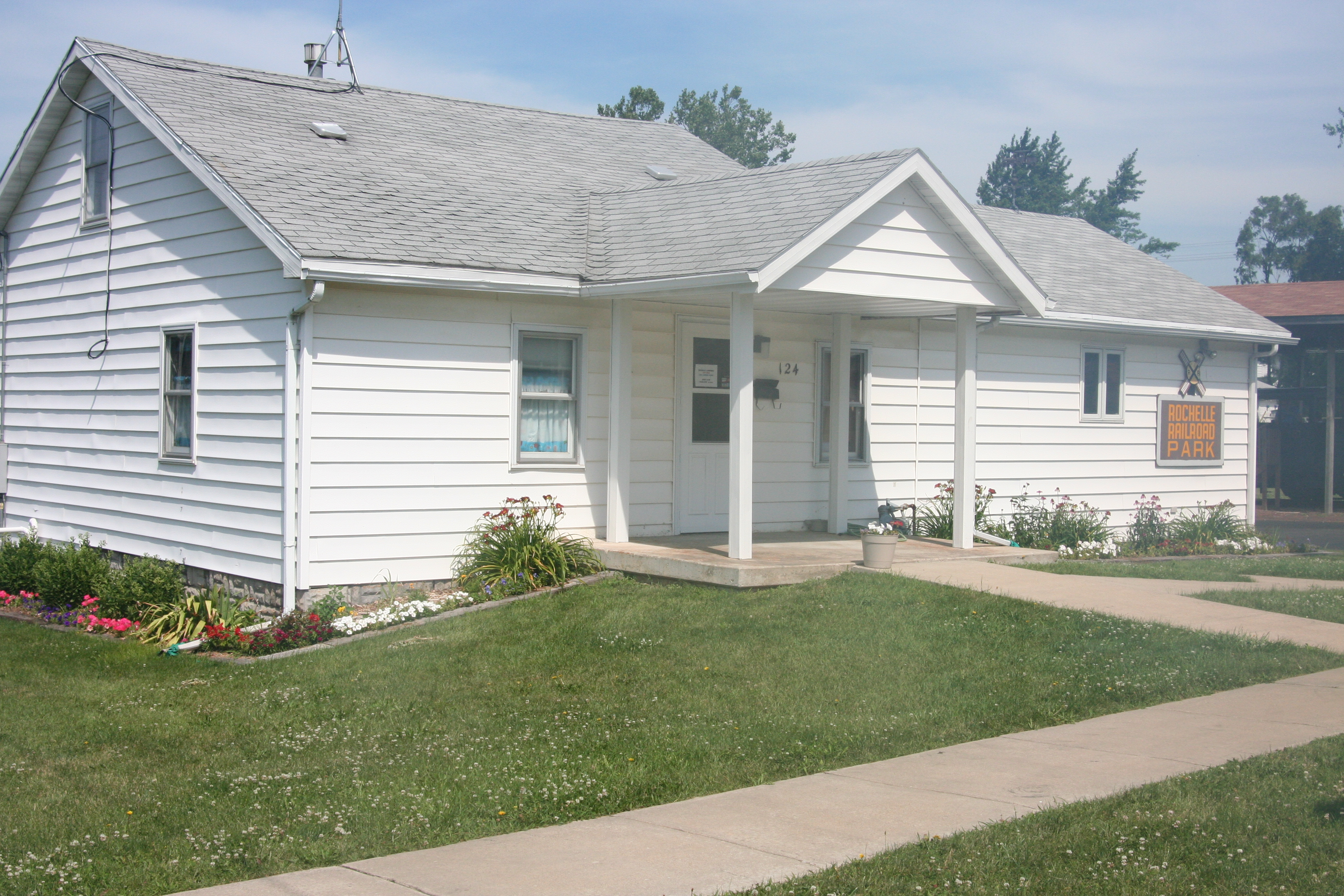
The Railroad Museum

== Arts and culture ==
Notable buildings include:

- William H. Holcomb House
- City and Town Hall
- Flagg Township Public Library
- The Hub Theater

Rochelle Railroad Park is located here.

== Education ==
Rochelle Community Consolidated District 231 includes the majority of Rochelle and some areas just outside town. Schools in that district include:

- Abraham Lincoln Elementary
- Central Elementary
- Floyd J. Tilton Elementary
- Phillip May Elementary
- Rochelle Middle School

Pieces of Rochelle in Ogle County extend into Creston Community Consolidated School District 161 and Kings Consolidated School District 144. Rochelle Township High School District 212, which covers all of Rochelle in Ogle County, operates Rochelle Township High School.

St. Paul Lutheran School enrolls children from age three, up through the eighth grade.

== Infrastructure ==
=== Transportation ===
Rochelle owns and operates Rochelle Municipal Airport.

==== Hub ====
Rochelle is known as the "Hub City" because of its location at the intersection of several major transportation routes. The first transcontinental highway in the United States, the Lincoln Highway, passed through Rochelle, as did US-51, one of the first highways to go the full north–south length of the United States. Both these roads have diminished in importance (and are now state highways 38 and 251, respectively), but Rochelle continues to be crossed by major highways, especially Interstates 88 and 39. Besides roadways, Rochelle is also crossed by two major rail lines; the Union Pacific Railroad and BNSF Railway mainlines cross inside of the city limits. The effect, as seen on a map, was one of the spokes of an old wagon wheel meeting at the "hub", and thus the nickname was born.

Several businesses carry the moniker "Hub City", including furniture stores, shopping centers, realty firms, dry cleaners, and many others. Additionally, he local high school's teams are known as the "Hubs".

Rochelle was once a stop for passenger trains operated by the Chicago, Burlington & Quincy, and its successor, the Burlington Northern, such as North Coast Limited. The town saw its last passenger train in 1971, and in 2007, the depot, which had been built in 1921, was demolished.

== Notable people ==
- Joan Allen, actress
- Joanna Baker, professor of ancient languages
- Delos W. Baxter, Illinois state senator, lawyer, and mayor of Rochelle
- Stan Campbell, pro football player
- Mabel Craft Deering, journalist, born in Rochelle
- Don Fischer, radio voice of Indiana Hoosiers
- William Gehring, Professor of Cognitive Psychology
- Lloyd Ingraham, actor
- Paul R. Lawrence, Harvard professor and pioneer of contingency theory
- William W. May, American athlete, competed in the 1908 London Olympics
- Abram B. Steele, lawyer and politician
- Judith C. Toth, member of the Maryland House of Delegates (1975–1990)
- Daniel Van Kirk, comedian

== See also ==
- Impact of the 2019–20 coronavirus pandemic on the meat industry in the United States
- 2015 Rochelle–Fairdale tornado
