= Lindenwood, Illinois =

Lindenwood
- Unincorporated community
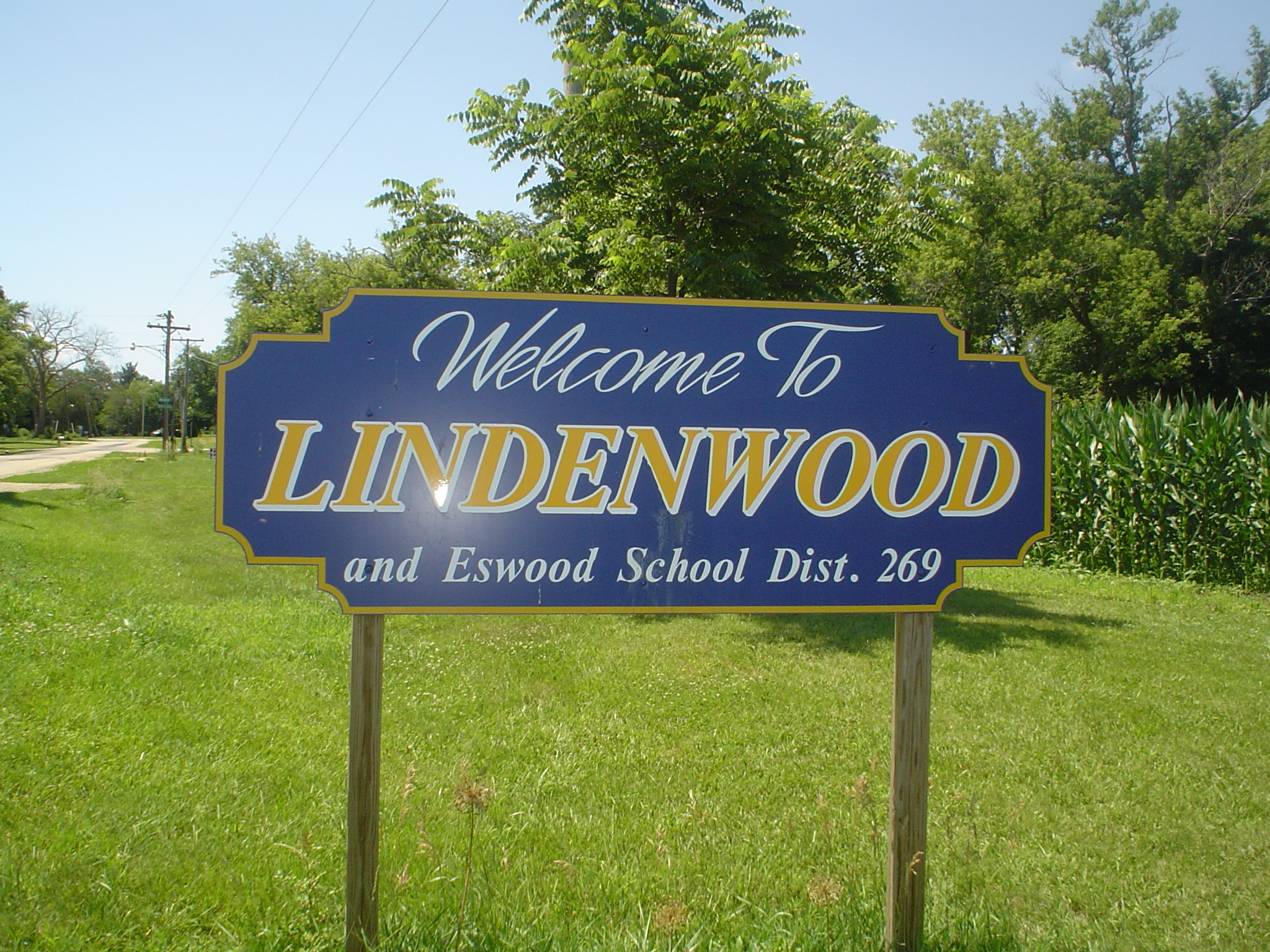
- Sign leading into Lindenwood

- Location within Ogle County Lindenwood (Illinois)
- Coordinates: 42°03′11″N 89°01′50″W
- Country: United States
- State: Illinois
- County: Ogle
- Township: Lynnville
- Elevation: 768 ft (234 m)

Population (2020)
  - Total: 682
- Time zone: UTC-6 (CST)
  - Summer (DST): UTC-5 (CDT)
- ZIP code: 61049
- Area codes: 815 and 779
- GNIS feature ID: 412230

Lindenwood is an unincorporated community in Ogle County, Illinois, United States, and is located north of Rochelle, along the banks of the Killbuck Creek.

== History ==
- 1835 - William Campbell builds the first cabin in the area.
- 1838 - Lynnville Settlement started with settlers coming from Canada and England.
- 1839 - March 25, first white child born in the area, Angeline Campbell.
- 1840 - Federal Land Map lists Campbell's Grove.
- 1841 - William Campbell dies and is buried at the edge of his woods.
- 1849 - Lynnville Township is established.
- 1869 - First Union Church is built in Lynnville, oldest known union church in Illinois.
- 1887 - Chicago Great Western Railroad built. New town of Lindenwood begins close to depot.

== Demographics ==
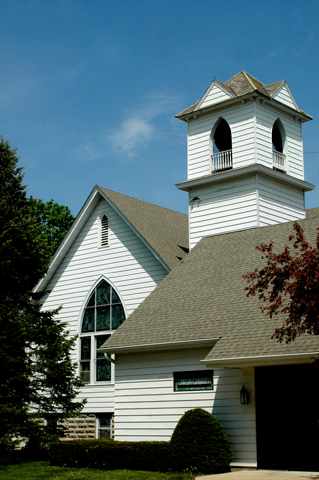
Lindenwood Union Church

As of the census of 2000, there were 505 people among 192 households in the village. The racial makeup of the city was 97.0% White, 0.20% African American, 1.2% from other races, and 1.6% from two or more races. Hispanic or Latino of any race are 3.0% of the population.

There were 192 households, out of which 36.5% had children under the age of 18 living with them, 67.7% were married couples living together, 5.7% had a female householder with no husband present, and 34.5% were non-families. 19.8% of all households were made up of individuals, and 7.3% had someone living alone who was 65 years of age or older. The average household size was 2.63 and the average family size was 3.03. In the city the population was spread out, with 25.9% under the age of 18, 6.4% from 18 to 24, 30.5% from 25 to 44, 20.2% from 45 to 64, and 17% who were 65 years of age or older. The population is divided 259 males and 246 females.

The median income for a household in the city was $47,625, and the median income for a family was $52,500. Males had a median income of $35,890 versus $25,058 for females. The per capita income for the city was $18,139. About 2.5% of families and 12.4% of the population were below the poverty line.

== Notable persons ==
- Ralyn M. Hill was a soldier in the United States Army who received the Medal of Honor for his actions during the World War I.
