= Kirkland, Illinois =

- Village
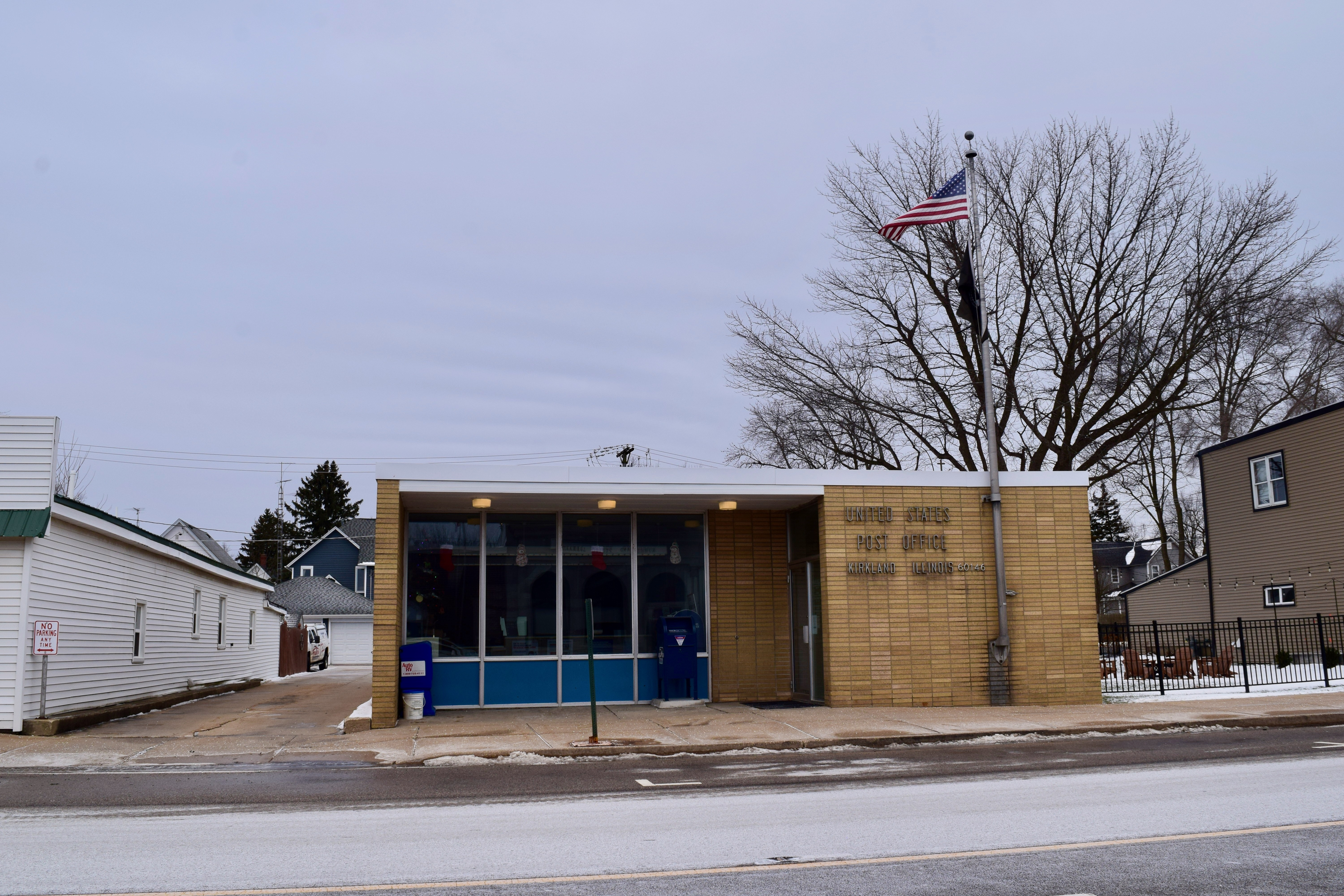
- Kirkland post office
- Motto: A nice place to call home
- Location of Kirkland in DeKalb County, Illinois.
- Coordinates: 42°05′35″N 88°51′48″W
- Country: United States
- State: Illinois
- County: DeKalb

Area
  - Total: 1.24 sq mi (3.21 km^{2})
  - Land: 1.23 sq mi (3.18 km^{2})
  - Water: 0.015 sq mi (0.04 km^{2})
- Elevation: 771 ft (235 m)

Population (2020)
  - Total: 1,650
  - Density: 1,345.7/sq mi (519.59/km^{2})
- Time zone: UTC-6 (CST)
  - Summer (DST): UTC-5 (CDT)
- ZIP code: 60146
- Area codes: 815 or 779
- FIPS code: 17-40156
- GNIS feature ID: 2398361
- Website: villageofkirkland.com

Kirkland is a village in DeKalb County, Illinois, United States. The population was 1,650 at the 2020 census, down from 1,744 at the 2010 census.

== History ==
A post office called Kirkland has been in operation since 1875. Kirkland was platted in 1876. The village was named for William T. Kirk, a local landowner.

== Geography ==
According to the 2010 census, Kirkland has a total area of 1.232 square miles (3.19 km^{2}), of which 1.22 square miles (3.16 km^{2}) (or 99.03%) is land and 0.012 square miles (0.03 km^{2}) (or 0.97%) is water.

== Demographics ==
Historical population
| Census | Pop. | Note | %± |
|---|---|---|---|
| 1890 | 410 | | — |
| 1900 | 636 | | 55.1% |
| 1910 | 685 | | 7.7% |
| 1920 | 599 | | −12.6% |
| 1930 | 526 | | −12.2% |
| 1940 | 570 | | 8.4% |
| 1950 | 685 | | 20.2% |
| 1960 | 928 | | 35.5% |
| 1970 | 1,138 | | 22.6% |
| 1980 | 1,155 | | 1.5% |
| 1990 | 1,011 | | −12.5% |
| 2000 | 1,166 | | 15.3% |
| 2010 | 1,744 | | 49.6% |
| 2020 | 1,650 | | −5.4% |
U.S. Decennial Census

=== Racial and ethnic composition ===
Kirkland village, Illinois – Racial and ethnic composition Note: the US Census treats Hispanic/Latino as an ethnic category. This table excludes Latinos from the racial categories and assigns them to a separate category. Hispanics/Latinos may be of any race.
| Race / Ethnicity (NH = Non-Hispanic) | Pop 2000 | Pop 2010 | Pop 2020 | % 2000 | % 2010 | % 2020 |
|---|---|---|---|---|---|---|
| White alone (NH) | 1,131 | 1,575 | 1,385 | 97.00% | 90.31% | 83.94% |
| Black or African American alone (NH) | 4 | 8 | 12 | 0.34% | 0.46% | 0.73% |
| Native American or Alaska Native alone (NH) | 1 | 2 | 3 | 0.09% | 0.11% | 0.18% |
| Asian alone (NH) | 0 | 12 | 3 | 0.00% | 0.69% | 0.18% |
| Native Hawaiian or Pacific Islander alone (NH) | 0 | 0 | 2 | 0.00% | 0.00% | 0.12% |
| Other race alone (NH) | 0 | 0 | 6 | 0.00% | 0.00% | 0.36% |
| Mixed race or Multiracial (NH) | 7 | 12 | 67 | 0.60% | 0.69% | 4.06% |
| Hispanic or Latino (any race) | 23 | 135 | 172 | 1.97% | 7.74% | 10.42% |
| Total | 1,166 | 1,744 | 1,650 | 100.00% | 100.00% | 100.00% |

=== 2020 census ===
As of the 2020 census, Kirkland had a population of 1,650. The median age was 37.4 years. 26.4% of residents were under the age of 18 and 11.9% of residents were 65 years of age or older. For every 100 females there were 108.1 males, and for every 100 females age 18 and over there were 104.9 males age 18 and over.

0.0% of residents lived in urban areas, while 100.0% lived in rural areas.

There were 611 households in Kirkland, of which 37.8% had children under the age of 18 living in them. Of all households, 50.6% were married-couple households, 18.3% were households with a male householder and no spouse or partner present, and 22.1% were households with a female householder and no spouse or partner present. About 23.7% of all households were made up of individuals and 9.3% had someone living alone who was 65 years of age or older. There were 637 housing units, of which 4.1% were vacant. The homeowner vacancy rate was 1.3% and the rental vacancy rate was 3.5%. The population density was 1,330.65 inhabitants per square mile (513.77/km^{2}). There were 369 families residing in the village, and the average housing unit density was 513.71 per square mile (198.34/km^{2}).

Racial composition as of the 2020 census
| Race | Number | Percent |
|---|---|---|
| White | 1,430 | 86.7% |
| Black or African American | 12 | 0.7% |
| American Indian and Alaska Native | 6 | 0.4% |
| Asian | 3 | 0.2% |
| Native Hawaiian and Other Pacific Islander | 2 | 0.1% |
| Some other race | 61 | 3.7% |
| Two or more races | 136 | 8.2% |

=== Income and poverty ===
The median income for a household in the village was $63,708, and the median income for a family was $67,159. Males had a median income of $50,938 versus $25,417 for females. The per capita income for the village was $27,281. About 10.3% of families and 12.8% of the population were below the poverty line, including 19.7% of those under age 18 and 4.9% of those age 65 or over.
