= National Register of Historic Places listings in Ogle County, Illinois =

Location of Ogle County in Illinois

This is a list of the National Register of Historic Places listings in Ogle County, Illinois.

This is intended to be a complete list of the properties and districts on the National Register of Historic Places in Ogle County, Illinois, United States. Latitude and longitude coordinates are provided for many National Register properties and districts; these locations may be seen together in a map.

There are 29 properties and districts listed on the National Register in the county.

This National Park Service list is complete through NPS recent listings posted June 6, 2026.

== Current listings ==
	Name on the Register	Image	Date listed	Location	City or town	Description
1	Zenas Aplington House	Zenas Aplington House	September 5, 2017 (#100001565)	123 N. Franklin Ave. 41°59′14″N 89°34′40″W	Polo	
2	Bryant H. and Lucie Barber House	Bryant H. and Lucie Barber House	February 10, 1993 (#92001849)	103 North Barber Avenue; 41°59′11″N 89°34′54″W	Polo	
3	Henry D. Barber House	Henry D. Barber House	March 28, 1974 (#74000770)	410 West Mason Street; 41°59′11″N 89°34′56″W	Polo	
4	Buffalo Grove Lime Kiln	Buffalo Grove Lime Kiln	November 20, 2002 (#02001348)	Galena Trail Road; 41°59′10″N 89°36′37″W	Polo	
5	Buffalo Township Public Library	Buffalo Township Public Library	November 7, 1995 (#95001236)	302 West Mason Street; 41°59′11″N 89°34′50″W	Polo	
6	Dr. William Burns House	Dr. William Burns House	August 27, 2018 (#100002824)	201 N Franklin Ave. 41°59′15″N 89°34′39″W	Polo	
7	Chana School	Chana School	December 6, 2005 (#05001369)	201 North River Road; 42°00′50″N 89°20′00″W	Oregon	
8	Chicago, Burlington, and Quincy Railroad Depot	Chicago, Burlington, and Quincy Railroad Depot	July 25, 1997 (#97000817)	400 Collins Street; 42°00′06″N 89°19′59″W	Oregon	
9	City and Town Hall	City and Town Hall	August 18, 1992 (#92001006)	Junction of Fourth Avenue and Sixth Street; 41°55′21″N 89°04′02″W	Rochelle	
10	John Deere House and Shop	John Deere House and Shop	October 15, 1966 (#66000327)	Illinois and Clinton Streets; 41°53′46″N 89°24′57″W	Grand Detour	
11	Flagg Township Public Library	Flagg Township Public Library	October 25, 1973 (#73000713)	Northeast corner of 7th Street at 4th Avenue; 41°55′24″N 89°04′05″W	Rochelle	
12	Samuel M. Hitt House	Samuel M. Hitt House	November 14, 1985 (#85002841)	7782 Illinois Route 64 West; 42°03′21″N 89°29′12″W	Mount Morris	
13	William H. Holcomb House	William H. Holcomb House	October 25, 1973 (#73000714)	526 North 7th Street; 41°55′23″N 89°04′19″W	Rochelle	
14	Indian Statue	Indian Statue	November 5, 2009 (#09000871)	Lowden Memorial State Park, 1411 N. River Rd. 42°00′50″N 89°20′00″W	Oregon	
15	John McGrath House	John McGrath House	May 2, 1996 (#96000513)	403 West Mason Street; 41°59′10″N 89°34′54″W	Polo	
16	William Moats Farm	William Moats Farm	February 12, 1987 (#86003724)	Wood Road; 41°54′05″N 89°14′50″W	Ashton	
17	Mount Morris Downtown Historic District	Mount Morris Downtown Historic District	August 10, 2022 (#100007993)	Wesley Ave., West Main St., South Seminary Ave., Center St. 42°02′51″N 89°26′03″W	Mount Morris	
18	Ogle County Courthouse	Ogle County Courthouse	September 10, 1981 (#81000222)	Courthouse Square; 42°00′50″N 89°20′00″W	Oregon	
19	Oregon Commercial Historic District	Oregon Commercial Historic District	August 16, 2006 (#06000713)	Roughly bounded by Jefferson, Franklin, 5th and 3rd Streets; 42°00′53″N 89°19′56″W	Oregon	
20	Oregon Public Library	Oregon Public Library	May 9, 2003 (#03000352)	300 Jefferson Street; 42°00′48″N 89°19′48″W	Oregon	
21	Pinehill	Pinehill	July 24, 1978 (#78001179)	400 Mix Street; 42°01′05″N 89°20′26″W	Oregon	
22	Polo Independent Order of Odd Fellows Lodge No. 197	Polo Independent Order of Odd Fellows Lodge No. 197	December 6, 2004 (#04001302)	117 West Mason Street; 41°59′09″N 89°34′43″W	Polo	
23	Rochelle Downtown Historic District	Rochelle Downtown Historic District	December 31, 2018 (#100003265)	Primarily 300-400 blks. Lincoln Hwy, 400 blk. Cherry & 400-500 blks. W. 4th Aves., 400 blk. Dewey & 300 blk. N. 6th Sts. 41°55′20″N 89°03′59″W	Rochelle	
24	St. Peter’s Episcopal Church	St. Peter’s Episcopal Church	January 2, 2026 (#100012470)	8225 South Main Street; 41°53′53″N 89°24′54″W	Grand Detour	
25	Soldier's Monument	Soldier's Monument	February 14, 1985 (#85000268)	Chestnut and 2nd Streets; 42°07′36″N 89°15′16″W	Byron	
26	Stillman's Run Battle Site	Stillman's Run Battle Site	December 8, 1983 (#83003587)	Roosevelt and Spruce Streets; 42°06′24″N 89°10′34″W	Stillman Valley	
27	Village of Davis Junction Town Hall	Village of Davis Junction Town Hall	June 10, 2008 (#08000504)	202 Pacific Ave. 42°06′00″N 89°05′50″W	Davis Junction	
28	David and Julia Watson House	David and Julia Watson House	May 8, 2017 (#100000963)	103 N. Maple Ave. 41°59′12″N 89°35′07″W	Polo	
29	White Pines State Park Lodge and Cabins	White Pines State Park Lodge and Cabins	March 4, 1985 (#85002404)	RR #1; 41°59′40″N 89°27′53″W	Mount Morris	

== See also ==
- List of National Historic Landmarks in Illinois
- National Register of Historic Places listings in Illinois
