= Village of Davis Junction Town Hall =

- U.S. National Register of Historic Places
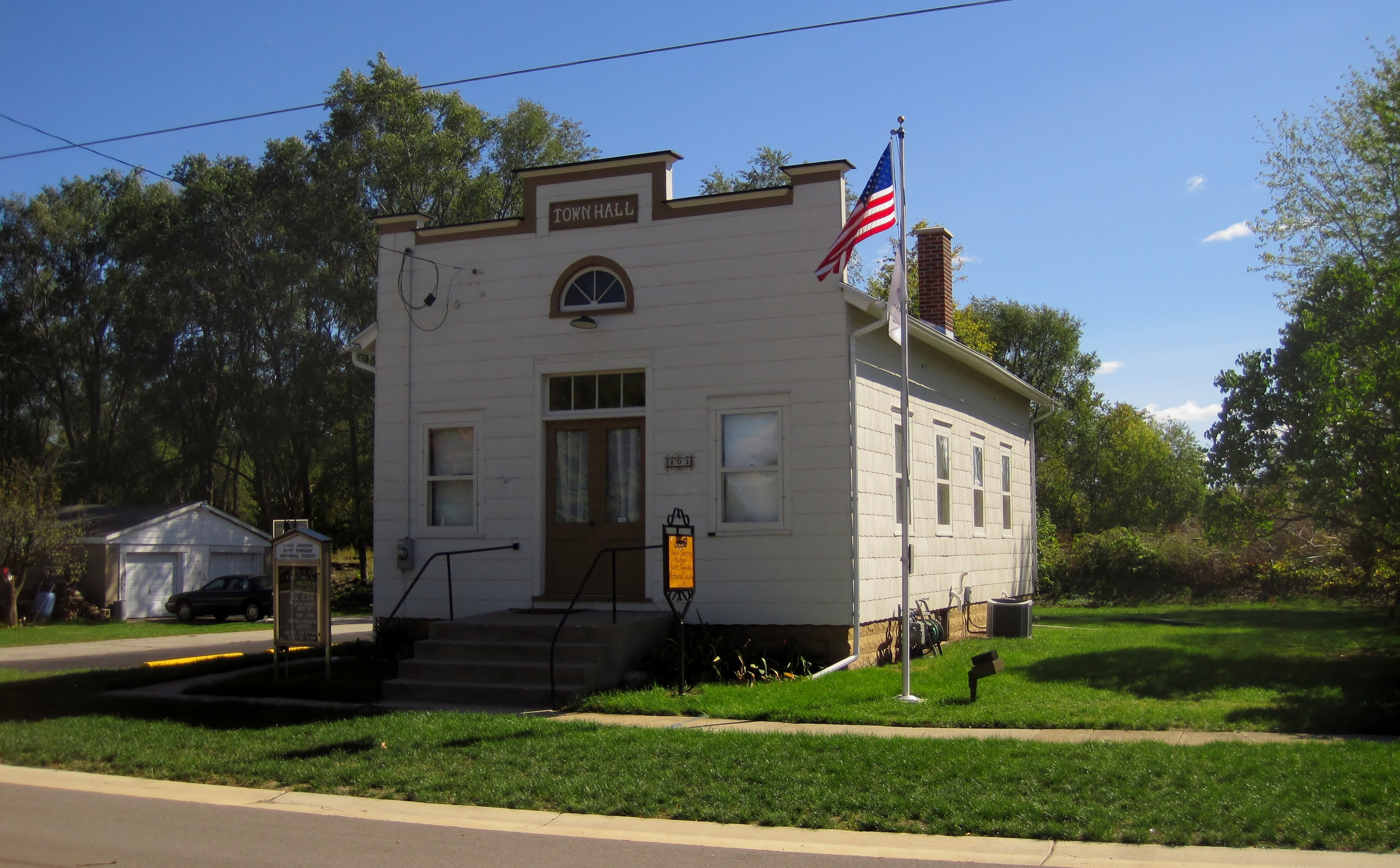

- Location within Illinois Location within the United States
- Location: 202 Pacific Ave., Davis Junction, Illinois
- Coordinates: 42°6′0″N 89°5′54″W
- Area: less than one acre
- Architectural style: Greek Revival
- NRHP reference No.: 08000504
- Added to NRHP: June 10, 2008

The Village of Davis Junction Town Hall is a historic building in Davis Junction, Illinois, United States. It is associated with the administration of Scott Township and is the only municipal building left from the early history of Davis Junction.

== History ==
Davis Junction, Illinois was founded by Jeremiah Davis in the 1850s. Davis made his fortune in the California Gold Rush and purchased over 1,000 acres (400 ha) in Scott Township, Ogle County. Davis submitted a plat in 1875, officially establishing the town. He allowed the Chicago & Iowa Railroad and the Pacific Railroad to lay track through the town. The railroads spurred development, and by 1878, it had a population around 200.

The town hall building was probably constructed in 1876 as Union Hall in response to the town's organization. Davis moved a schoolhouse north of town to make room for the hall. The town hall held the town meetings and elections, which previously were held in schoolhouses. As one of the few developments in Scott Township, Davis Junction was home to the township meetings and elections as well until 1880. In the 1890s, management of the building was entrusted to the Modern Woodmen of America, and the building became known as Bushman Camp after the local chapter. A dispute in 1894 made statewide news: a dance club leased the hall, but an anti-dancing group forbid them to hold a dance there. When the dance proceeded anyway, the anti-dance group pumped sulfuric gas into the hall to clear out the youngsters. However, the dancers returned to the hall later that day.

A small fire occurred in 1908. Later that year, the town purchased the hall from Davis for $50. The village rehabilitated the hall, restoring its place as a center of civic activity. The Modern Woodmen continued to regularly rent the venue until 1930. In the 1960s, Scott Township voted to move township functions into a newly constructed firehouse. The action was approved, although the town hall was still used for occasional town functions. In 1975, it became home to the Davis Junction Historical Society. The building was sold into private hands in 1993, then sold to the Historical Society in 2006.
