= Scott Township, Illinois =

Scott Township, Illinois may refer to one of the following townships:

- Scott Township, Champaign County, Illinois
- Scott Township, Ogle County, Illinois

There is also:

- Scottville Township, Macoupin County, Illinois
- Scotland Township, McDonough County, Illinois

See also

- Scott Township (disambiguation)
