= Upstate Illini Conference =

Defunct high school sports league in Illinois

- Conference: IHSA
- Founded: 1974
- Folded: 2000
- No. of teams: 36 in total
- Region: Northwest and North-central Illinois (Bureau, Boone, Carroll, DeKalb, Jo Daviess, Kane, Lee, McHenry, Ogle, Stephenson and Winnebago counties)

Locations
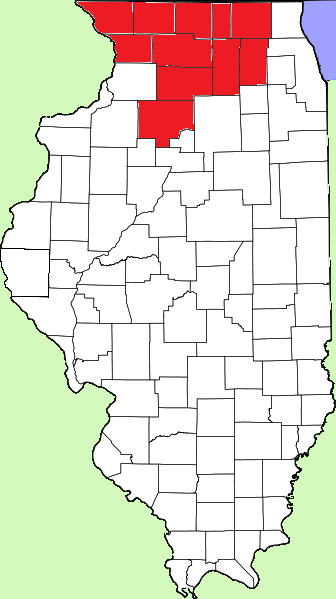
- The Upstate Illini Conference within Illinois

Locations of UIC Schools

The Upstate Illini Conference (UIC) was a high school conference in northwest and north central Illinois. The conference participated in athletics and activities in the Illinois High School Association. The conference included small public and private high schools with enrollments between 75 and 1,000 students in Bureau, Boone, Carroll, DeKalb, Jo Daviess, Kane, Lee, McHenry, Ogle, Stephenson and Winnebago counties.

== History ==
The name Upstate Illini was originally given to a collection of 15 schools primarily coming from five conferences, the Blackhawk, Route 72, Northwestern Illinois, SHARK and US Grant. The 15 original teams included: Ashton, Chadwick, Durand, Elizabeth, Franklin Center, Hanover, Leaf River, Milledgeville, Mt. Carroll, Orangeville, Pearl City, Rockford Lutheran, Scales Mound, Shannon and Thomson. This league began play in 1974, however within two years the league would lose over half of the teams based primarily on football. The teams which left either returned to their original conference or began play under a new moniker, the Northwest 8 Conference. The remaining teams, all without football, maintained the name Upstate Illini. The teams that stayed within the conference, were Chadwick, Elizabeth, Hanover, Scales Mound, Shannon and Thomson.

Eventually talks for a re-branding of the Northwest 8 took place in 1987, due to the fact that it had grown to 12 teams and was looking to expand beyond that number. In 1988, the Upstate Illini Conference was reconstructed and schools from the Northwest 8 joined, competition for all sports, with the exception of football, was established. In 1991, football schedules were set with 6 teams in the North Division: Durand, North Boone, Pearl City, Rockford (Lutheran), Elizabeth (River Ridge)-Warren (coop) and South Beloit and the South Division: Ashton-Franklin Center, Kirkland-Hiawatha, Milledgeville, Mt. Carroll, Mt. Morris and Polo.

In 1994, Mt. Morris was merged into the Oregon School District and dropped out of the conference. In that same year, Huntley joined and the divisions were realigned into East - Durand, Huntley, Kirkland-Hiawatha, North Boone, Rockford Lutheran and South Beloit and West - Ashton-Franklin Center, Milledgeville, Mt Carroll, Pearl City, Polo, River Ridge and Warren. In 1991, Pecatonica joined the league for all sports except football, due to existing schedules in the Mid-Northern, however, in 1992 joined the East Division. In 1995 Huntley dropped out and East Dubuque, Forreston and La Moille were added to the West Division while Ashton-Franklin Center moved from the West division to the East. In 1996 the Northwestern Illinois Conference (NWIC) and Upstate Illini merged under the Upstate Illini banner. Based on these new additions, three divisions were formed West - Dakota, East Dubuque, Galena, Lena-Winslow, Orangeville, River Ridge, Stockton and Warren. East - Ashton-Franklin Center, Durand, Kirkland-Hiawatha, North Boone, Pecatonica, Rockford Lutheran and South Beloit. South - Forreston, Freeport Aquin, Lanark (Eastland), Milledgeville, Mt. Carroll, Pearl City and Polo. In 1999 Savanna was added to the South Division and Rockford Christian Life to the East Division making the total number of teams 24 for football, 26 overall, the largest conference in Illinois outside of the Chicago Public League. The year 2000 was the last year under the Upstate Illini name because six schools (Ashton-Franklin Center, Durand, Kirkland-Hiawatha, North Boone, Pecatonica and South Beloit) left in 2001 to form the Four Rivers Conference. Rockford Lutheran and Rockford Christian Life also departed the conference in 2001, seeking competition more suited to their locations and size by joining the Private School League. The remaining schools realigned under the Northwest Upstate Illini Conference banner.

== All-Time Membership ==
The Upstate Illini Conference had various divisions throughout its history, the list of schools encompasses all of the schools which were once a part of the conference.

School	Location	Mascot	Colors	Year Joined	Year Left	IHSA Classes A/AA	IHSA Music Class	IHSA Football Class	Current NUIC Member
Aquin Catholic; High School	Freeport, IL	Bulldogs	Navy Blue, Gold	1996	2000	A	D	1A	Yes
Ashton; High School	Ashton, IL	Aces	Green, Gold	1974/1991	1976/2000	A	-	1A	Yes♠
Chadwick; High School	Chadwick, IL	Silver Streaks	Red, Silver, Black	1974	1989	A	C	-	Yes♣
Dakota; High School	Dakota, IL	Indians	Maroon, White	1996	2000	A	C	1A	Yes
Durand; High School	Durand, IL	Bulldogs	Royal Blue, White	1974/1991	1976/2000	A	C	1A	Yes
East Dubuque; High School	East Dubuque, IL	Warriors	Royal Blue, White	1996	2000	A	C	1A	Yes
Eastland; High School	Lanark, IL	Cougars	Royal Blue, Orange	1996	2000	A	C	Coops w/Pearl City	Yes♥
Elizabeth; High School	Elizabeth, IL	Terrapins	Orange, Blue	1974	1984	A	D	-	Yes♦
Forreston; High School	Forreston, IL	Cardinals	Red, White, Black	1996	2000	A	C	1A	Yes°
Franklin Center; High School	Franklin Grove, IL	Eagles	Maroon, Gold	1974/1991	1976/2000	A	-	1A	Yes♠
Galena; High School	Galena, IL	Pirates	Royal Blue, White	1996	2000	A	C	1A	Yes
Hanover; High School	Hanover, IL	Red Devils	Red, White	1974	1984	A	C	-	Yes♦
Huntley; High School	Huntley, IL	Redskins	Red, Black, White	1993	1995	A	A	3A	No
Kirkland-Hiawatha; High School	Kirkland, IL	Hawks	Navy Blue, Gold	1991	2000	A	D	1A	No
La Moille; High School	La Moille, IL	Lions	Red, White	1995	1996	A	D	1A	No
Lanark; High School	Lanark, IL	Beavers	Blue, White	-	-	A	C	1A	Yes♥
Leaf River; High School	Leaf River, IL	Demons	Royal Blue, White	1974/1991	1976/2000	A	-	1A	Yes°
Lena-Winslow; High School	Lena, IL	Panthers	Black, Gold	1996	2000	A	C	2A	Yes
Milledgeville; High School	Milledgeville, IL	Missiles	Orange, Black	1974/1991	1976/2000	A	D	1A	Yes♣
Mount Carroll; High School	Mount Carroll, IL	Hawks	Purple, Gold	1974/1991	1976/2000	A	D	1A	Yes•
Mount Morris; High School	Mount Morris, IL	Mounders	Red, Black	1991	1994	A	D	1A	No³
North Boone; High School	Poplar Grove, IL	Vikings	Green, White	1991	2000	A	C	2A	No
Orangeville; High School	Orangeville, IL	Broncos	Purple, Gold	1974/1996	1976/2000	A	D	1A	Yes
Pearl City; High School	Pearl City, IL	Wolves	Red, White, Black	1974/1991	1976/2000	A	D	2A	Yes
Pecatonica; High School	Pecatonica, IL	Indians	Purple, Vegas Gold	1991	2000	A	C	1A	Yes
Polo Community; High School	Polo, IL	Marcos	Blue, Gold	1991	2000	A	C	1A	Yes
River Ridge; High School	Elizabeth, IL*	Wildcats	Navy Blue, Grey	1991	2000	A	D	Coop w/Warren	Yes♦
Rockford Christian Life; High School	Rockford, IL	Eagles	Blue, Gray	1999	2000	A	C	2A	No
Rockford Lutheran; High School	Rockford, IL	Crusaders	Purple, White	1974/1991	1976/2000	A	C	2A	No
Savanna; High School	Savanna, IL	Indians	Red, White	1999	2000*	A	C	2A	Yes•
Scales Mound; High School	Scales Mound, IL	Hornet	Green, White	1974	2000	A	C	-	Yes
Shannon; High School	Shannon, IL	Eagles	Orange, Black	1974	1986	A	D	-	Yes♥
South Beloit; High School	South Beloit, IL	Sobos	Scarlet Red, White	1991	2000	A	C	1A	No
Stockton; High School	Stockton, IL	Blackhawks	Maroon, Gold	1996	2000	A	C	1A	Yes
Thomson; High School	Thomson, IL	Trojans	Purple, Gold	1974	2000	A	C	-	Yes•
Warren; High School	Warren, IL	Warriors	Orange, Black	1991	2000	A	D	1A	Yes

♦ Elizabeth and Hanover consolidated creating the River Ridge CUSD in 1985.
♥ Shannon and Lanark consolidated creating the Eastland CUSD in 1986.
♣ Chadwick and Milledgeville consolidated creating the Chadwick-Milledgeville CUSD in 1989.
° Leaf River ceased operations and was merged into Forreston High School in 1990
³ Mt. Morris ceased operations and was merged into Oregon High School in 1995
♠ Ashton and Franklin Center consolidated creating Ashton-Franklin Center High School in 2004
• Mount Carroll, Savanna and Thomson consolidated, creating the West Carroll School District in 2006.
* River Ridge High School relocated to Hanover, IL in 2004.

=== Membership timeline ===
Full members Full members (non-football) Northwest 8 Conference Northwestern Illinois Conference Mid/Big-Northern Conference SHARK Conference Other Conference
