= Scott Township, Indiana =

Scott Township, Indiana may refer to one of the following places:

- Scott Township, Kosciusko County, Indiana
- Scott Township, Montgomery County, Indiana
- Scott Township, Steuben County, Indiana
- Scott Township, Vanderburgh County, Indiana

See also

- Scott Township (disambiguation)
