= Monroe Center, Illinois =

Monroe Center
- Village
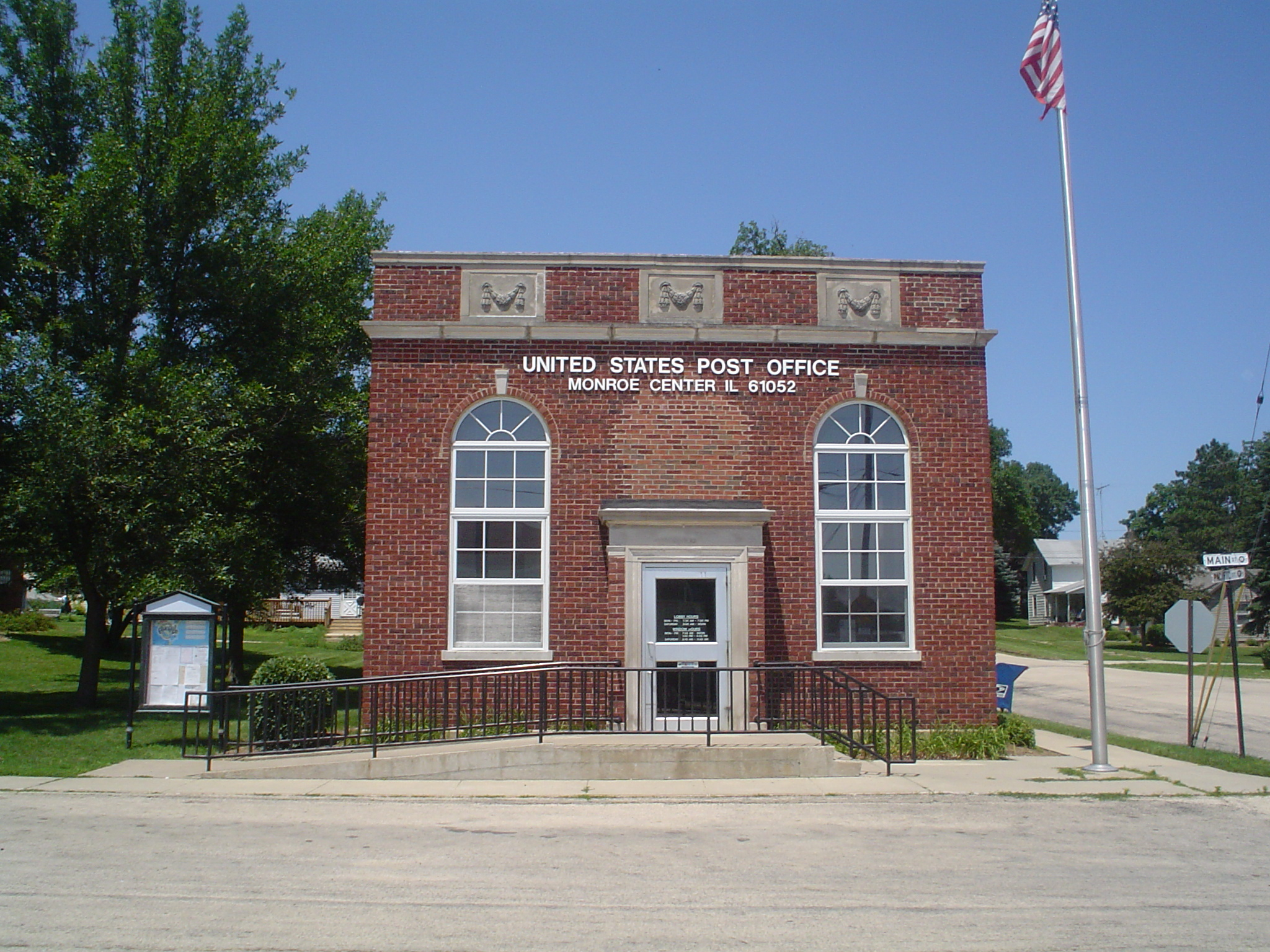
- Post office in Monroe Center

- Location of Monroe Center in Ogle County, Illinois.

- Location within Ogle County Monroe Center (Illinois)
- Coordinates: 42°05′54″N 89°00′02″W
- Country: United States
- State: Illinois
- County: Ogle
- Township: Monroe
- Established: 1875

Area
  - Village: 1.21 sq mi (3.14 km^{2})
  - Land: 1.21 sq mi (3.14 km^{2})
  - Water: 0 sq mi (0.00 km^{2})
- Elevation: 853 ft (260 m)

Population (2020)
  - Village: 411
  - Density: 339.1/sq mi (130.91/km^{2})
  - Urban: 550
  - Metro: 1,200
- Time zone: UTC-6 (CST)
  - Summer (DST): UTC-5 (CDT)
- Zip code: 61052
- Area code: 815
- FIPS code: 17-50062
- GNIS feature ID: 2399384
- Website: www.monroecenter.org

Monroe Center is a village in Ogle County, Illinois, United States, southeast of Rockford in Monroe Township. It is located on the Canadian Pacific Railway and on Illinois Route 72, approximately 0.6 mile east of Exit 111 from Interstate 39. As of the 2020 census, Monroe Center had a population of 411.

== Geography ==
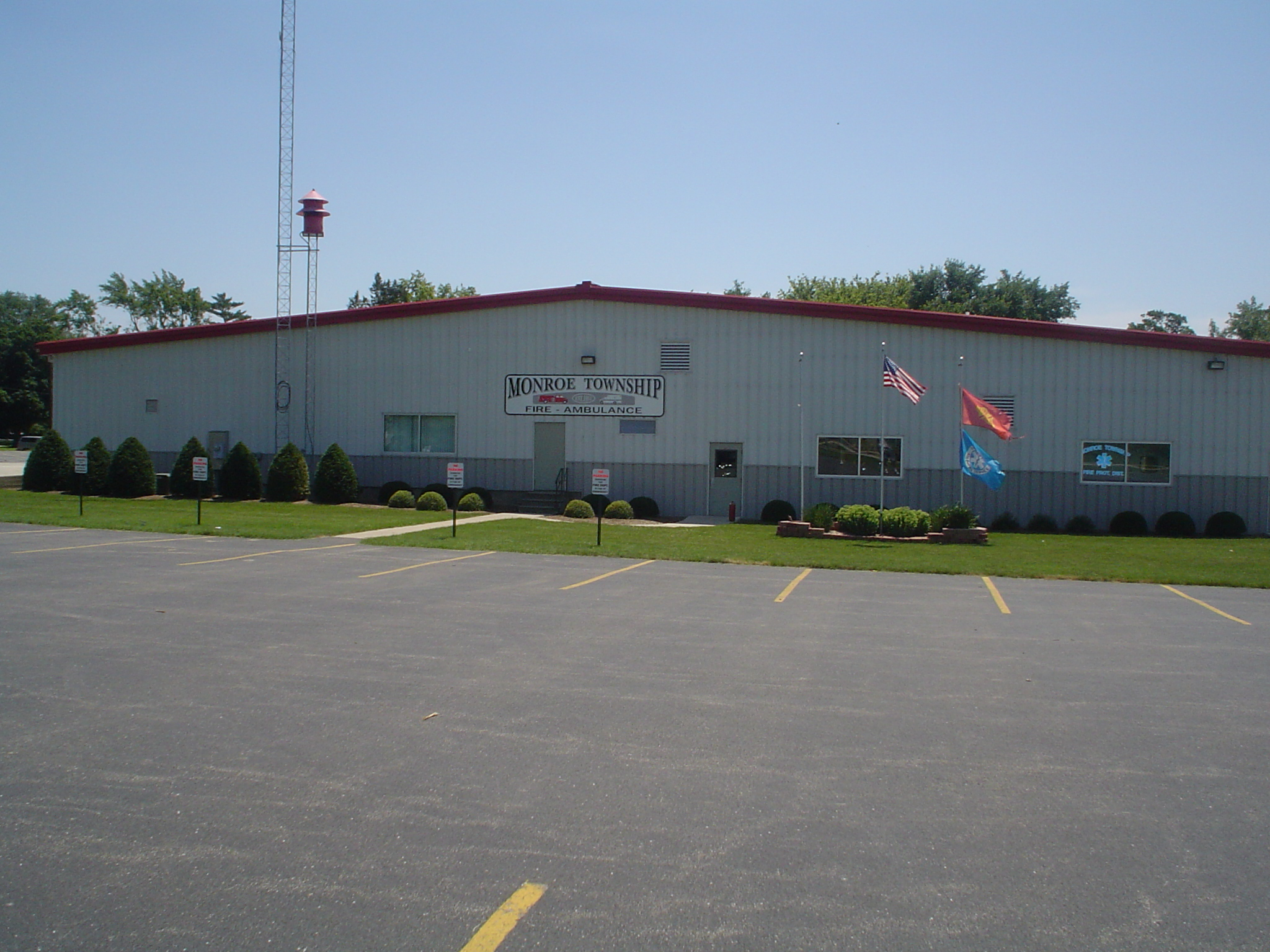
Fire department for Monroe Center and Monroe Township

Monroe Center is on a hill and has many fields surrounding it. The Kilbuck Creek along with the retainment ponds and lakes alongside I-39 are the only bodies of water in the area. According to the 2010 census, Monroe Center has a total area of 1.21 square miles (3.13 km^{2}), all land.

== Demographics ==
Historical population
| Census | Pop. | Note | %± |
|---|---|---|---|
| 2010 | 471 | | — |
| 2020 | 411 | | −12.7% |
U.S. Decennial Census

== Education ==
It is in the Meridian Community Unit School District 223.

== Notable people ==
- Charles W. Baker (1876–1953), Illinois state legislator and farmer, was born in Monroe Center.
- Andra Martin (born Sandra Rehn) (1935–2022), actress, grew up on the family farm in Monroe Center.
