= Polo Independent Order of Odd Fellows Lodge No. 197 =

- U.S. National Register of Historic Places
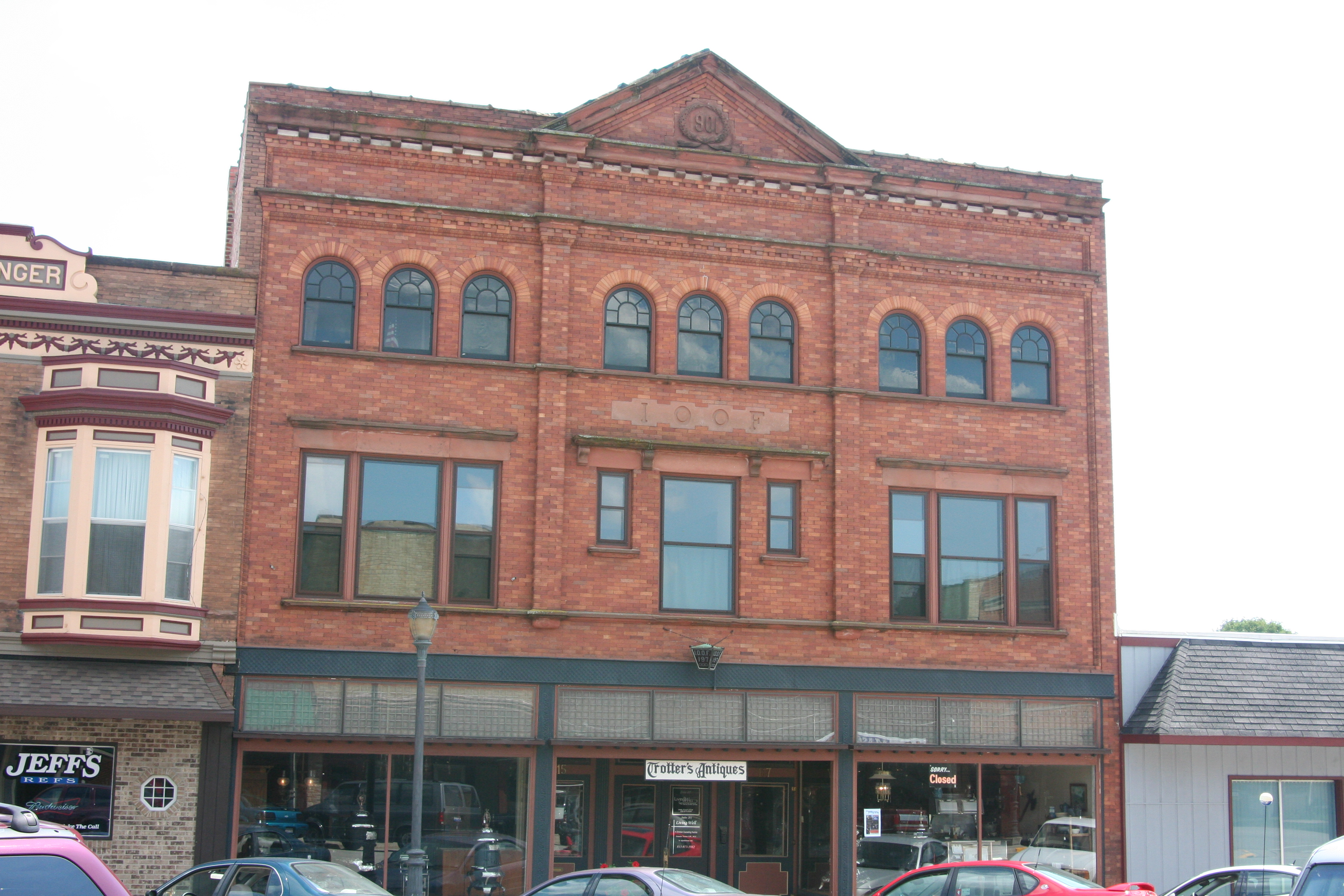
- The Odd Fellows Lodge in downtown Polo, Illinois.

- Location within Illinois Location within the United States
- Location: 117 W. Mason St., Polo, Illinois
- Coordinates: 41°59′13″N 89°34′38″W
- Area: less than one acre
- Built: 1901-02
- Architect: Charles Wyman Bradley and Frank A. Carpenter
- Architectural style: Classical Revival
- NRHP reference No.: 04001302
- Added to NRHP: December 6, 2004

Polo Independent Order of Odd Fellows Lodge No. 197 is a historic Independent Order of Odd Fellows building located at 117 W. Mason St. in Polo, Illinois. The lodge was built in 1901-02 for Polo's chapter of the Odd Fellows, which was established in 1856; it was the fifth meeting place used by the chapter. Architects Charles Wyman Bradley and Frank A. Carpenter designed the building in the Classical Revival style. The brick building is divided into three bays, which are separated by brick pilasters on the upper floors. An egg-and-dart frame encircles the upper two stories. A parapet extends along the roofline; the parapet is topped by a corbelled pediment containing a medallion with the year of construction. The Odd Fellows met on the upper stories of the building until the 1990s; the first floor has historically been used as a storefront.

The building was added to the National Register of Historic Places on December 6, 2004.

== See also ==
- National Register of Historic Places listings in Ogle County, Illinois
