= Trailblazer Conference =

Illinois high school athletic conference (1981-1987)

The Trailblazer Conference is a former high school athletic conference with its catchment in north central Illinois. The conference existed from 1981 to 1987, and most of its members were affiliated with the Illinois High School Association.

== History ==
Location of Original Trailblazer Conference Members

The Trailblazer Conference was formed in 1981 by six small high schools in northern Illinois and southern Wisconsin: Alden-Hebron, Beloit Catholic, Kirkland-Hiawatha, North Boone, Rockford Lutheran and South Beloit. Three members of the conference (Beloit Catholic, North Boone and South Beloit) previously belonged to the SHARK Conference, and left one year before that conference was folded. Alden-Hebron and Kirkland-Hiawatha were former members of the Little Eight, and Rockford Lutheran competed in the Northwest Eight before the Trailblazer Conference's formation. Aside from the WISAA-affiliated Beloit Catholic, all five other schools belonged to the IHSA. Before the conference began competition, Beloit Catholic announced their entry into the Wisconsin-based Rock Valley Conference, effective for the 1982-83 school year. They were replaced by Christian Life School in Rockford soon after, and the Trailblazer Conference remained at six schools before the exit of North Boone to join the Big Eight Conference in 1985. The conference continued with five members for the next two years, until a merger with the larger Upstate Illini Conference was announced in 1987. Four Trailblazer Conference members (Kirkland-Hiawatha, Rockford Christian Life, Rockford Lutheran and South Beloit) joined that conference's East Division for the 1987-88 school year. Alden-Hebron was left out of the merger and competed as an independent until joining the Wisconsin-based Indian Trails Conference in 1990.

== Conference membership history ==
=== Final members ===
School	Location	Affiliation	Mascot	Colors	Joined	Left	Conference Joined	Current Conference
Alden-Hebron	Hebron, IL	Public	Giants		1981	1987	Independent	Northeastern Athletic
Kirkland-Hiawatha	Kirkland, IL	Public	Hawks		1981	1987	Upstate Illini	Little Ten
Rockford Christian Life	Rockford, IL	Private (Nondenominational Christian)	Eagles		1982	1987	Upstate Illini	Northeastern Athletic
Rockford Lutheran	Rockford, IL	Private (Lutheran, LCMS)	Crusaders		1981	1987	Upstate Illini	Big Northern
South Beloit	South Beloit, IL	Public	Sobos		1981	1987	Upstate Illini	Northeastern Athletic

=== Former members ===
School	Location	Affiliation	Mascot	Colors	Joined	Left	Conference Joined	Current Conference
Beloit Catholic	Beloit, WI	Private (Catholic)	Crusaders		1981	1982	Rock Valley (WIAA)	Closed in 2000
North Boone	Poplar Grove, IL	Public	Vikings		1981	1985	Big Eight	Big Northern

== List of conference champions ==
=== Boys Basketball ===
School	Quantity	Years
South Beloit	4	1983, 1984, 1985, 1986
Beloit Catholic	1	1982
Kirkland-Hiawatha	1	1987
Alden-Hebron	0	
North Boone	0	
Rockford Christian Life	0	
Rockford Lutheran	0	

=== Girls Basketball ===
School	Quantity	Years
Kirkland-Hiawatha	4	1982, 1983, 1986, 1987
North Boone	3	1983, 1984, 1985
Alden-Hebron	0	
Beloit Catholic	0	
Rockford Christian Life	0	
Rockford Lutheran	0	
South Beloit	0	

=== Football ===
School	Quantity	Years
South Beloit	2	1982, 1984
Beloit Catholic	1	1981
North Boone	1	1983
Alden-Hebron	0	
Kirkland-Hiawatha	0	
Rockford Lutheran	0	
