= Bryant H. and Lucie Barber House =

Historic house in Illinois, United States

- U.S. National Register of Historic Places
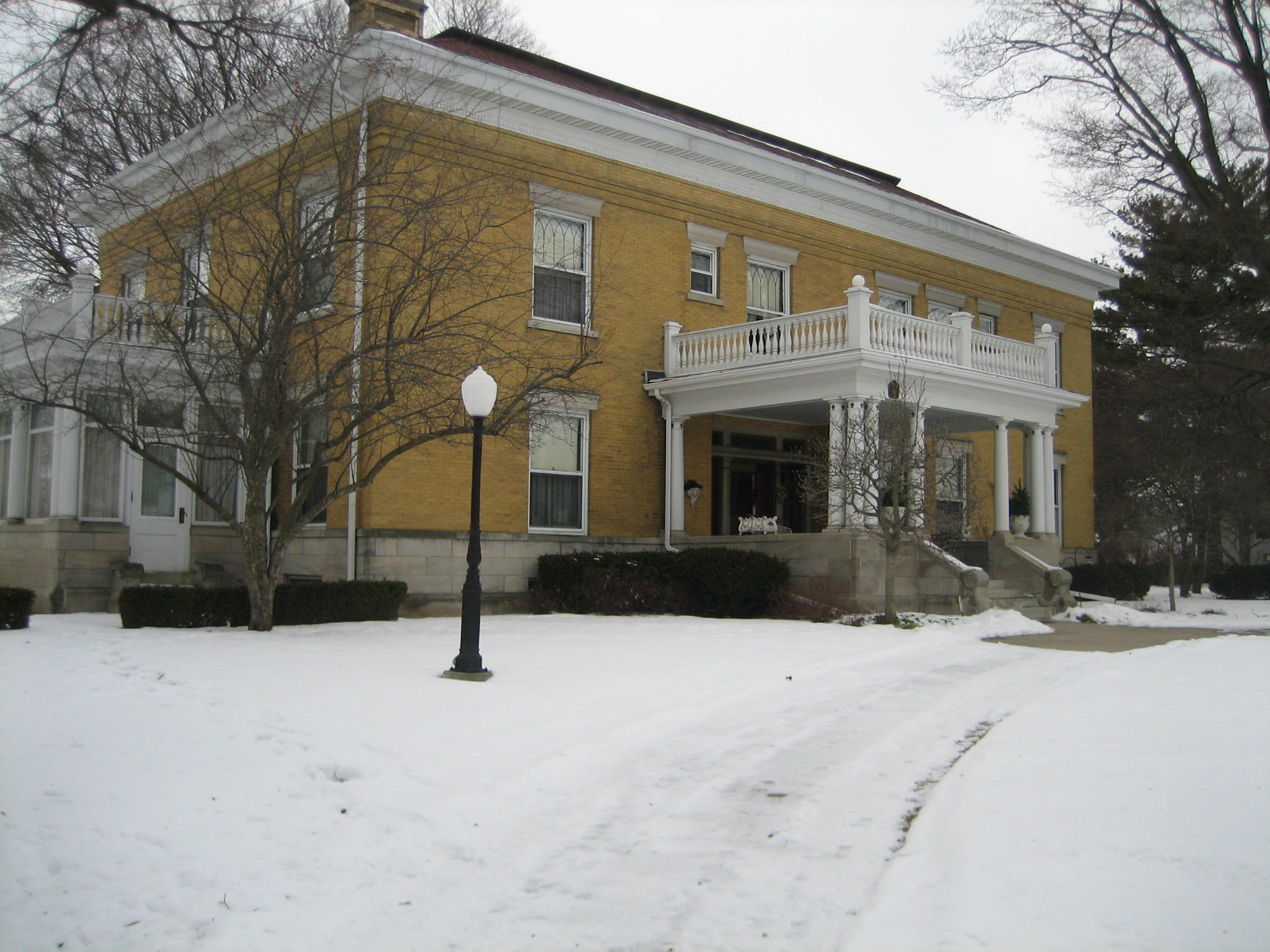
- The Bryant and Lucie Barber House.

- Location within Illinois Location within the United States
- Location: 103 N. Barber Ave., Polo, Illinois
- Coordinates: 41°59′13″N 89°34′38″W
- Area: less than one acre
- Built: c. 1901
- Architect: Joseph Lyman Silsbee
- Architectural style: Classical Revival
- NRHP reference No.: 92001849
- Added to NRHP: February 10, 1993

The Bryant H. and Lucie Barber House is a Registered Historic Place in the Ogle County, Illinois city of Polo. It is one of six overall sites and three homes in Polo listed on the Register. The other two homes listed on the National Register of Historic Places in Polo are the John McGrath House and the Henry D. Barber House.

== Architecture ==
The Classical Revival Bryant H. and Lucie Barber House was designed by Joseph Lyman Silsbee. Constructed around 1901, the house has brick walls, a stone foundation and incorporates steel into its construction.

== Significance ==
The Bryant H. and Lucie Barber House was listed on the National Register of Historic Places on February 10, 1993, for its significance in the area of architecture.
