= John McGrath House =

Historic house in Illinois, United States

- U.S. National Register of Historic Places
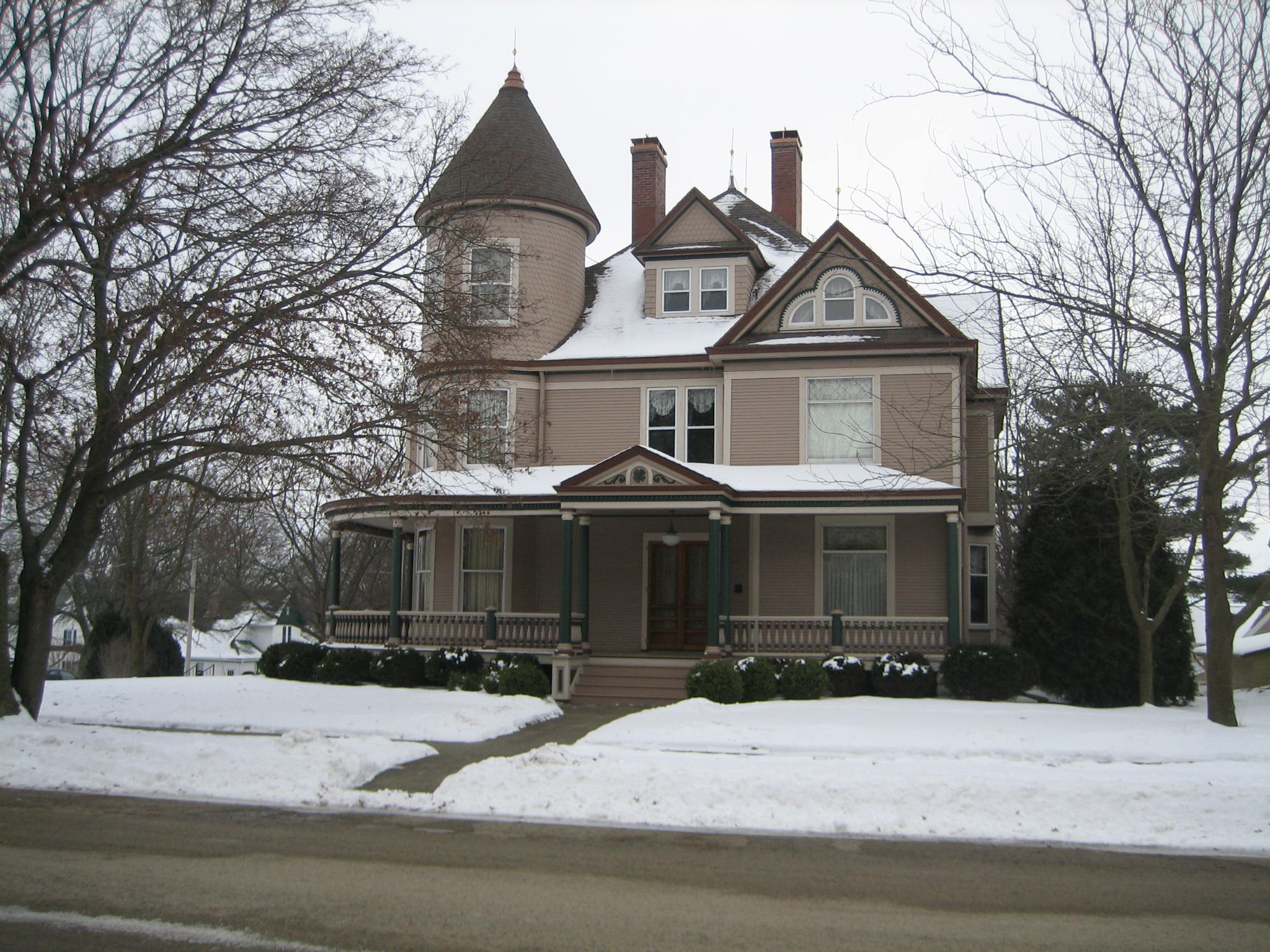
- The Queen Anne John McGrath House in Polo, Illinois.

- Location within Illinois Location within the United States
- Location: 403 W. Mason St., Polo, Illinois
- Coordinates: 41°59′13″N 89°34′38″W
- Area: less than one acre
- Built: 1896
- Architect: George W. McBride
- Architectural style: Queen Anne
- NRHP reference No.: 96000513
- Added to NRHP: May 2, 1996

The John McGrath House is a Registered Historic Place in the Ogle County, Illinois city of Polo. It is one of six overall sites and three homes in Polo listed on the Register. The other two homes listed on the National Register of Historic Places in Polo are the Henry D. Barber House and the Bryant H. and Lucie Barber House. The McGrath House joined the Register in 1996.

== Architecture ==
The wood John McGrath House stands on a limestone foundation and has an asphalt roof. Erected in 1896, the house was constructed by builder C.A. Stone and designed by George W. McBride. The McGrath House is a significant example of Queen Anne style architecture.

== Significance ==
The John McGrath House was listed on the National Register of Historic Places on May 2, 1996, for its significance in the area of architecture.
