= Scott Township, Ohio =

Scott Township, Ohio may refer to:

- Scott Township, Adams County, Ohio
- Scott Township, Brown County, Ohio
- Scott Township, Marion County, Ohio
- Scott Township, Sandusky County, Ohio

== See also ==
- Scott Township (disambiguation)
