= Zenas Aplington =

American politician

Maj. Zenas Aplington
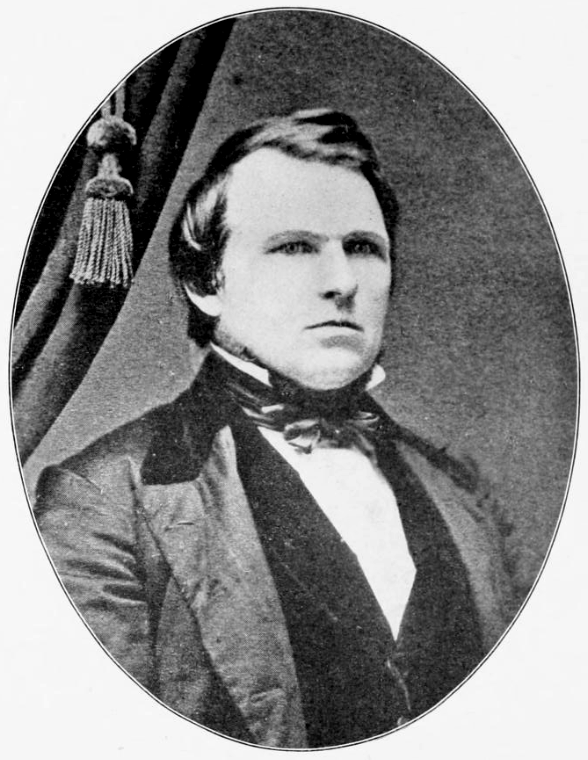

Member of the Illinois Senate from the 3rd district
- In office 1858 – 1862
- Preceded by: Wait Talcott
- Succeeded by: Cornelius Lansing

Personal details
- Born: December 24, 1815 Broome County, New York
- Died: May 8, 1862 (aged 46) Corinth, Mississippi
- Party: Republican
- Profession: farmer, merchant, carpenter, blacksmith

Zenas Aplington was an American politician from New York. He founded the town of Polo, Illinois and is the namesake of Aplington, Iowa. He was elected to the Illinois Senate in 1858, but died in battle with the 7th Illinois Cavalry Regiment at the Siege of Corinth before his term was complete.

== Biography ==
Zenas Aplington was born in Broome County, New York on December 24, 1815. Around 1837, he emigrated to Buffalo Grove, Ogle County, Illinois, where he worked as a farmer, blacksmith, merchant, and blacksmith. He built the Lee County Jail in Dixon. In the 1850s, he negotiated with the Illinois Central Railroad to have a section run through his property. Upon its completion, the town of Polo was established with Aplington regarded as the founder. Aplington purchased land elsewhere along the Illinois Central in Iowa with his newfound wealth, and in 1857, he co-founded the town of Aplington in Butler County. Aplington built the first building there, a general store, before returning to Illinois. In 1856, Abraham Lincoln lodged at Aplington's house for two nights while on the campaign trail for John C. Fremont.

In 1858, Aplington was elected to the Illinois Senate, but died before his term was completed. During this term, the Civil War broke out and Aplington organized a cavalry company. He was named a major and the unit was attached to the 7th Illinois Cavalry Regiment. He oversaw a camp in Bird's Point, Missouri, then rejoined the unit to participate in the Battle of Island Number Ten. The Illinois 7th then participated in the Siege of Corinth. On May 8, 1862, his unit was commanded to charge a Confederate position in a nearby forest; however, Aplington was shot and killed during this charge.

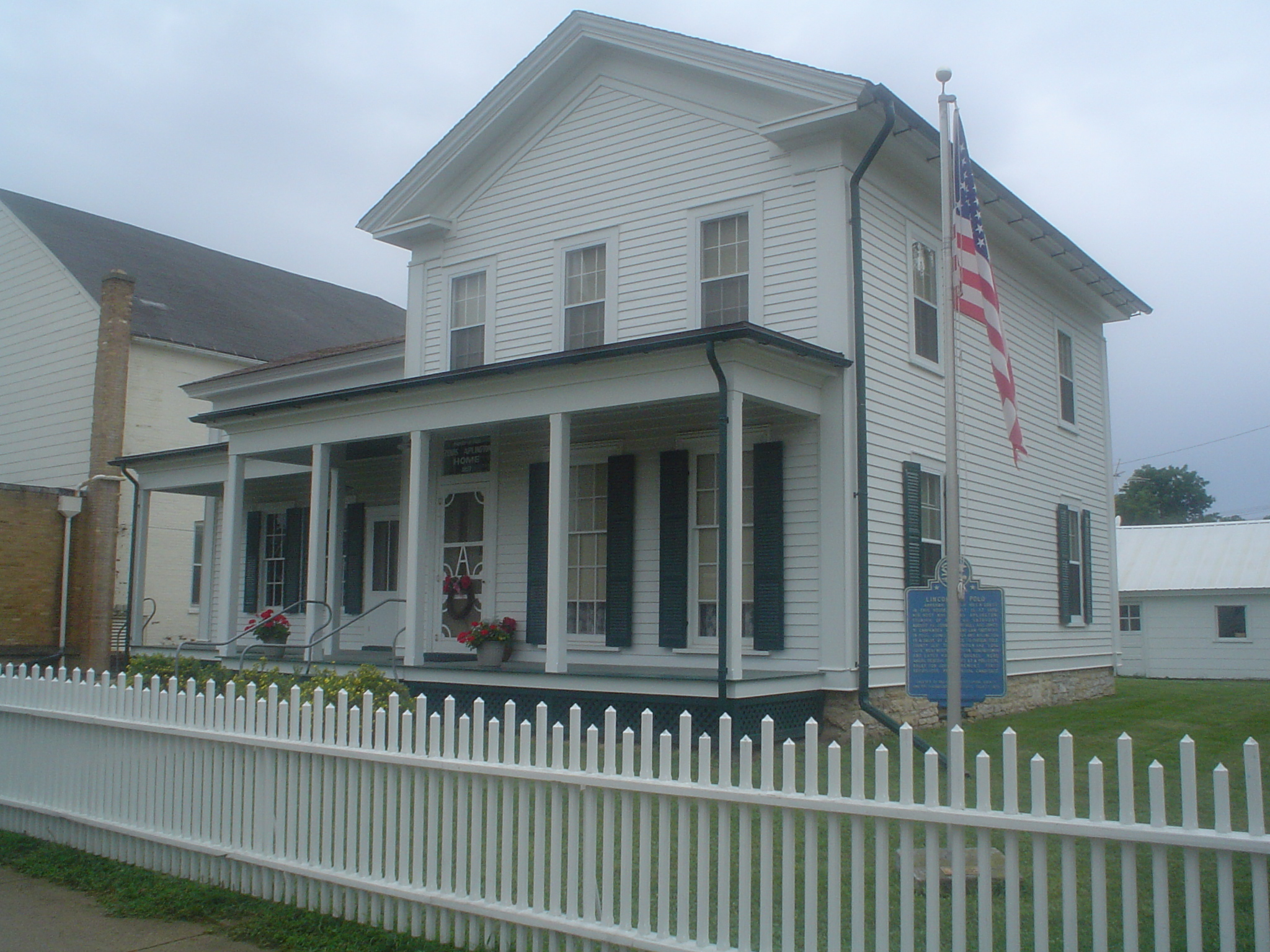
Aplington's house in Polo

Aplington married Caroline Nichols on April 27, 1842. They had six children.. On September 5, 2017, his house in Polo was recognized by the National Park Service with a listing on the National Register of Historic Places.
