= 7th Illinois Cavalry Regiment =

- Illinois flag
- Active: October 13, 1861, to October 20, 1865
- Country: United States
- Allegiance: Union
- Branch: Cavalry
- Engagements: Siege of Corinth; Battle of Nashville

The 7th Illinois Cavalry Regiment was a cavalry regiment that served in the Union Army during the American Civil War.

== Service ==
The 7th Illinois Volunteer Cavalry was mustered into service at Camp Butler, Illinois, on October 13, 1861.

After the fall of Vicksburg, the 7th Illinois Cavalry served with the Third Cavalry Brigade of the XVI Army Corps, headquartered at Memphis, Tennessee. It was camped north of Collierville, Tennessee, when Confederate General James Ronald Chalmers attacked the garrison with 2,500 troops on 11 October 1863. A portion of the troops circled around the north side of the town and attacked the camp of the 7th Illinois Cavalry and routed them, capturing and burning their supplies. The 7th Illinois Cavalry was able to regain their reputation when General Chalmers repeated the attack on Collierville on 3 November 1863. The Confederates were repulsed at this second Battle of Collierville by the Union Colonel Edward Hatch, while leading the 7th Illinois Cavalry, the 6th Illinois Cavalry, 2nd Iowa Cavalry and the 1st Illinois Light Artillery.

In December 1864 the 7th Illinois Cavalry took part in the Battle of Nashville.

In June 1865, just after the war, the unit was (apparently without horses) in Mississippi, 'scattered along the Mobile and Ohio railroad.'

The regiment was mustered out on October 20, 1865.

== Total strength and casualties ==
The regiment suffered 5 officers and 59 enlisted men who were killed in action or who died of their wounds and 3 officers and 267 enlisted men who died of disease, for a total of 334 fatalities.

== Commanders ==
- Colonel William Pitt Kellogg - resigned June 1, 1862
- Colonel Edward Prince - mustered out October 15, 1864.
- Colonel John M. Graham - mustered out with the regiment.
- Major Zenas Aplington - killed at the Siege of Corinth May 8, 1862

== See also ==
- List of Illinois Civil War Units
- Illinois in the American Civil War
- Battle of Collierville
