= Ashton-Franklin Center High School =

Ashton-Franklin Center Jr./Sr. High School

Location
- 611 Wester Avenue; Ashton, Lee County, Illinois 61006; United States
- 41.8657°N 89.2299°W

Information
- Type: Comprehensive Public High School
- Established: 2004
- School district: Ashton-Franklin Center Community Unit School District 275
- Principal: Malinda Hurt
- Teaching staff: 16.00 (FTE)
- Grades: 7–12
- Enrollment: 217 (2023–2024)
- Student to teacher ratio: 13.56
- Campus type: Rural, fringe
- Colors: Black, Gold, White
- Athletics conference: Northwest Upstate Illini
- Team name: Raiders
- PSAE average: 62%
- Feeder schools: Ashton-Franklin Center Middle School
- Website: Ashton-Franklin Center High School Website

Ashton-Franklin Center High School, or AFCHS, is a public four-year high school located at 611 Western Avenue in Ashton, Illinois, a village in Lee County, Illinois, in the Midwestern United States. AFCHS serves the communities and surrounding areas of Ashton and Franklin Grove. The campus is located 40 miles south of Rockford, Illinois, and serves a mixed village and rural residential community.

== Academics ==
Ashton-Franklin Center High School made Adequate Yearly Progress, with 62% of students meeting or exceeding standards, on the Prairie State Achievement Exam, an Illinois state test part of the No Child Left Behind Act. The average high school graduation rate in the period 1999-2009 was 90.8%. In 2019, AFC ranked as the 12,463 best school in the United States, and 406 in Illinois based on U.S. News & World Report.

Ashton-Franklin Center High School mascot

== Athletics ==
Ashton-Franklin Center High School competes in the Northwest Upstate Illini Conference and is a member school in the Illinois High School Association. Their mascot is the Raiders, with school colors of black, gold, and white. The school has no state championships on record in team athletics and activities.

== History ==
Ashton-Franklin Center High School formed out of the consolidation of Ashton High School and Franklin Center High School in 2004, with Franklin Center separating from what is now Paw Paw CUSD #271. Prior to that, Franklin Center High School was formed out of the consolidation of Franklin Grove High School and Lee Center High School in 1956. Original High Schools Ashton, Franklin Grove, and Lee Center were founded in 1890, 1923, and 1847 (as Lee Center Academy), respectively.
