= Zenas Aplington House =

Historic house in Illinois, United States

- U.S. National Register of Historic Places
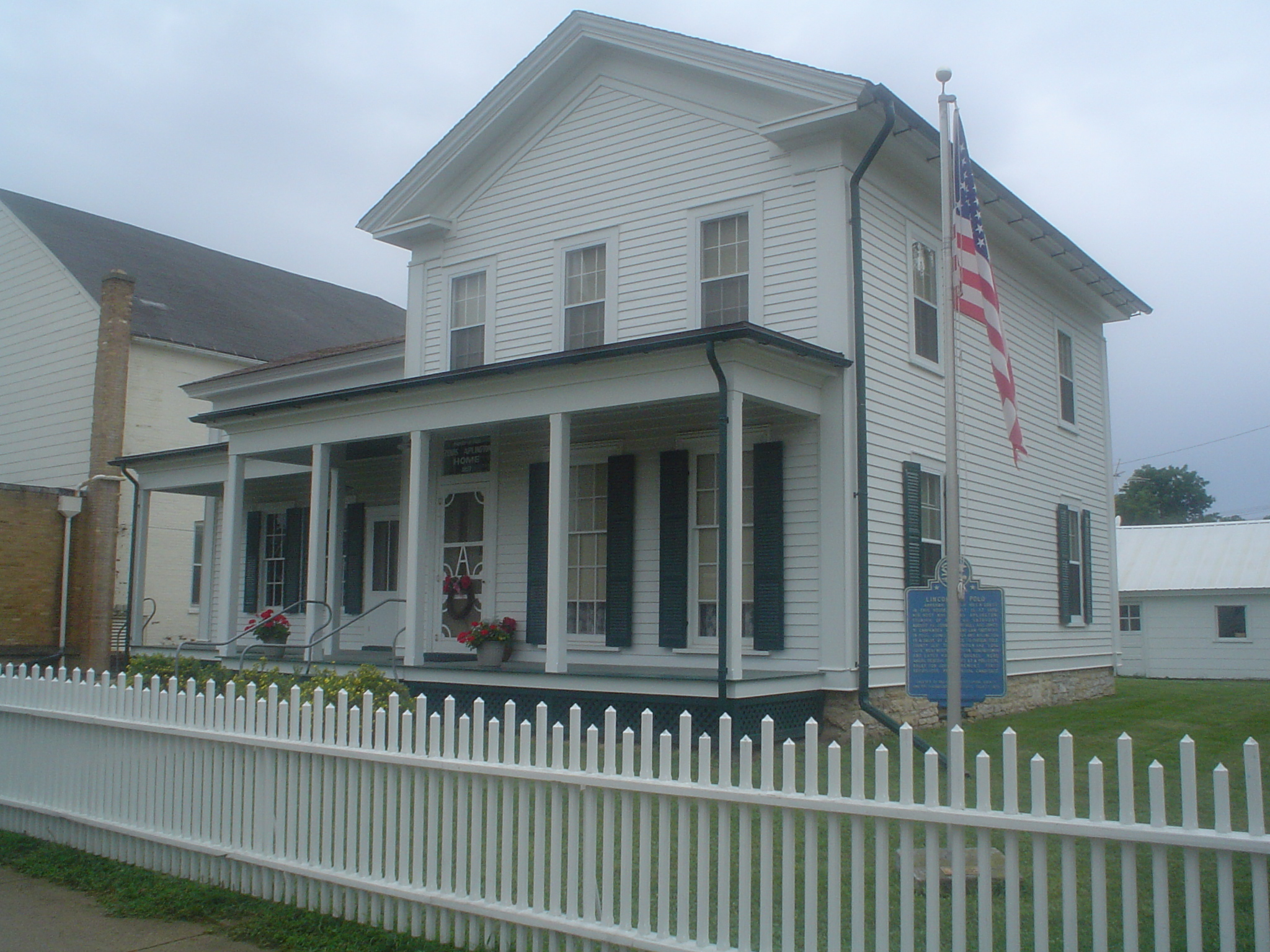

- Location within Illinois Location within the United States
- Location: 123 N. Franklin Ave., Polo, Illinois
- Coordinates: 41°59′14″N 89°34′40″W
- Built: 1853
- Architectural style: Greek Revival
- NRHP reference No.: 100001565
- Added to NRHP: September 5, 2017

The Zenas Aplington House is a historic house located at 123 N. Franklin Avenue in Polo, Illinois.

== History ==
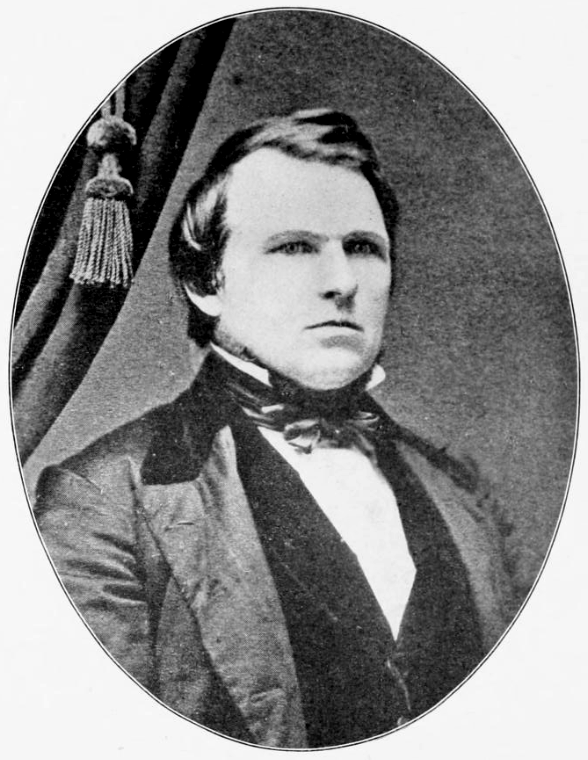
Zenas Aplington (1815–1862)

The house was built in 1853 by Zenas Aplington, the founder of Polo. When the nearby community of Buffalo Grove refused to let the Illinois Central Railroad build through the town in 1852, Aplington provided his farmland to the railroad; Polo developed around the farmland, and by 1856 nearly all of Buffalo Grove had moved to the new town. Aplington chose the community's name in honor of Marco Polo. His role in founding Polo and his work for the Republican Party led him to befriend Abraham Lincoln, and Lincoln spent two nights in the house in 1856. The house itself has a vernacular Upright and Wing plan, which consists of a two-story gabled main section with a one-story gabled wing, and features Greek Revival details.

The house was added to the National Register of Historic Places on September 5, 2017.
