= David and Julia Watson House =

Historic house in Illinois, United States

- U.S. National Register of Historic Places
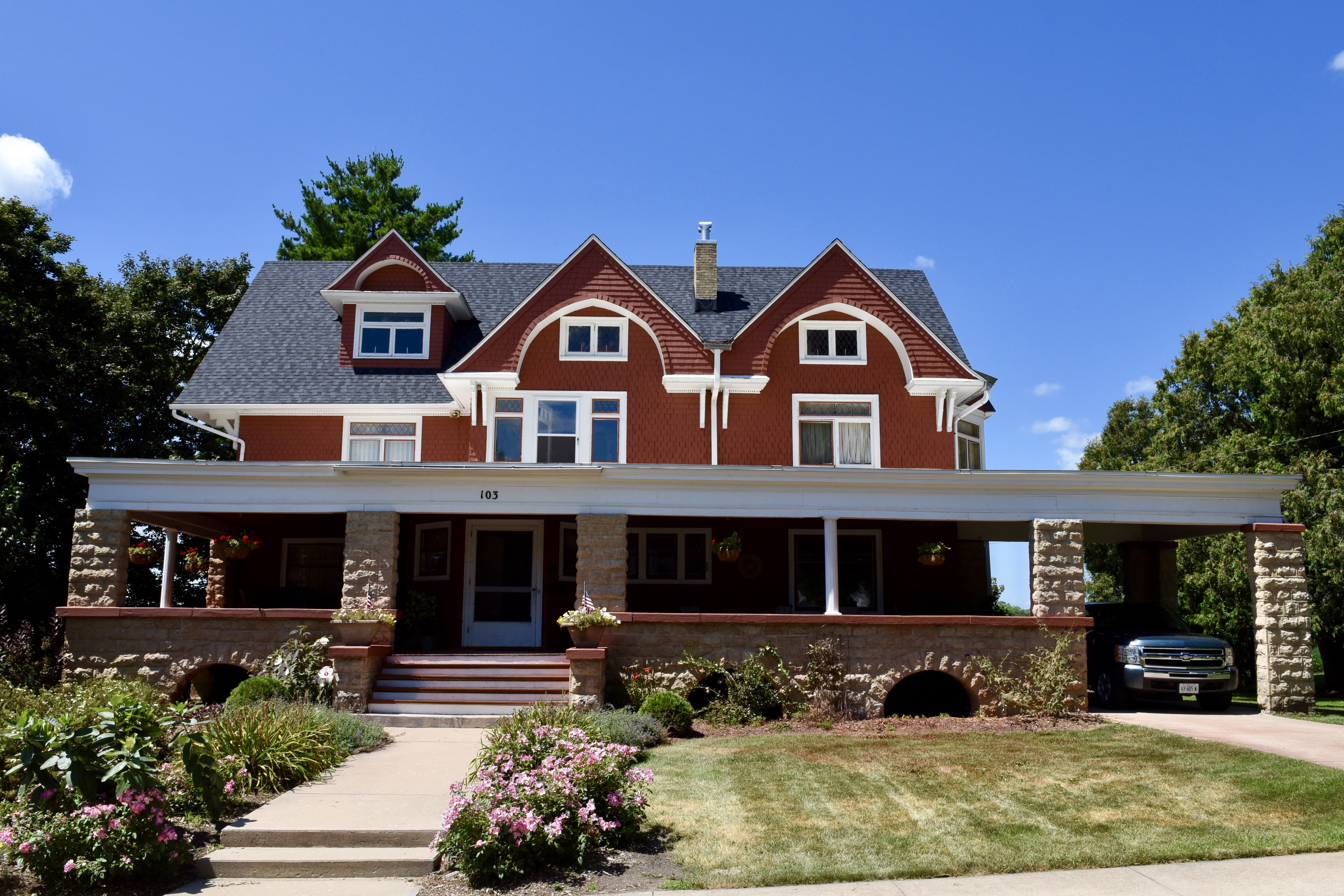

- Location within Illinois Location within the United States
- Location: 103 N. Maple Ave., Polo, Illinois
- Coordinates: 41°59′12″N 89°35′07″W
- Built: 1900
- Architectural style: Shingle style
- NRHP reference No.: 100000963
- Added to NRHP: May 8, 2017

The David and Julia Watson House is a historic house located at 103 N. Maple Avenue in Polo, Illinois. The house was built in 1900 for dentist David S. Watson and his wife Julia. Rockford architect Edward F. Dowling designed the house in the Shingle style. The house has an asymmetrical front with two large gables and one dormer; both of the large gables include arches with brackets at each end. A large front porch supported by stone columns extends along the front of the house and over its driveway.
