= Dr. William Burns House =

Historic house in Illinois, United States

- U.S. National Register of Historic Places
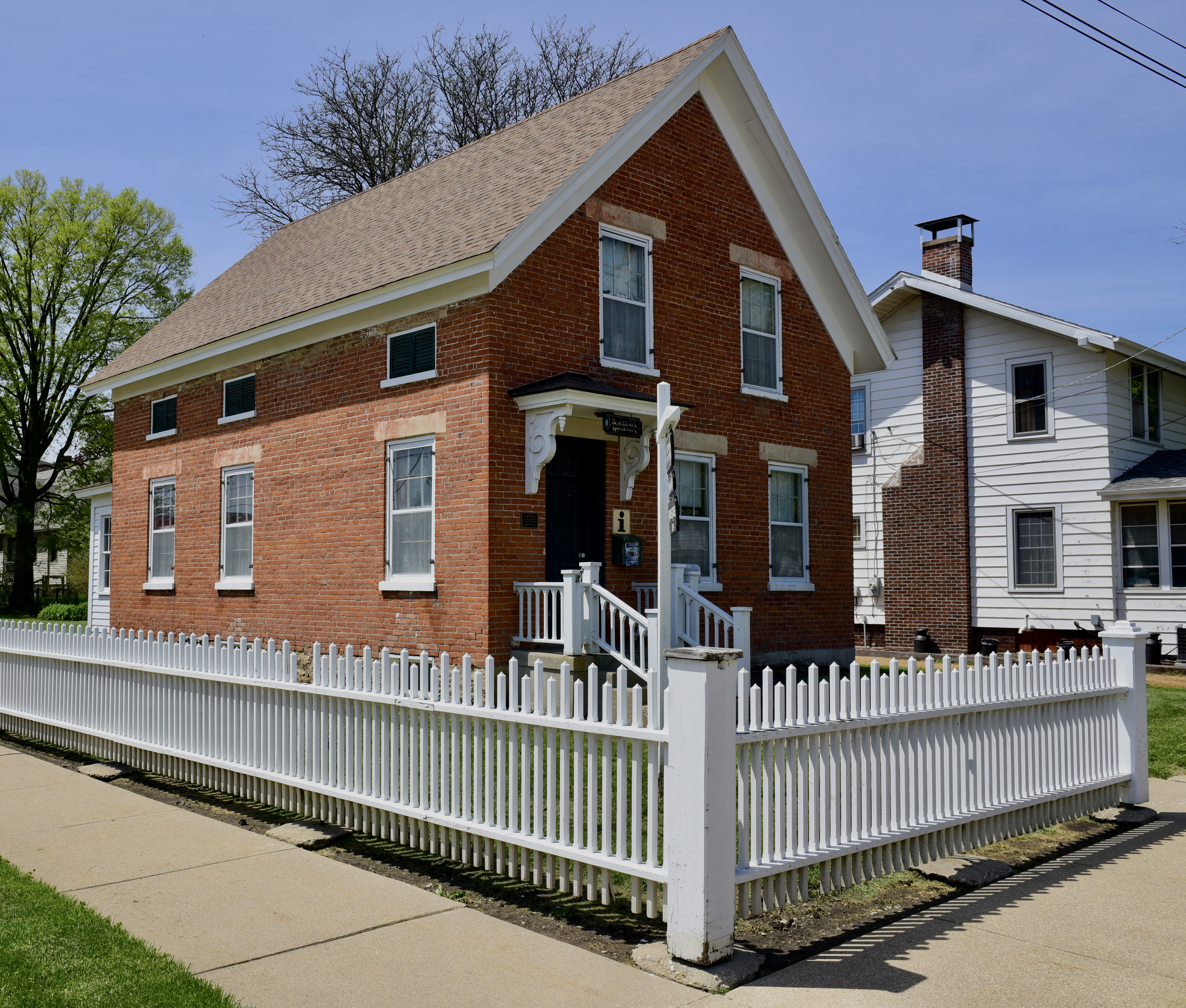

- Location within Illinois Location within the United States
- Location: 201 N. Franklin Ave. Polo, Illinois
- Coordinates: 41°59′15″N 89°34′39″W
- Built: 1854
- Architectural style: Gable front
- NRHP reference No.: 100002824
- Added to NRHP: August 27, 2018

The Dr. William Burns House is a historic house at 201 N. Franklin Avenue in Polo, Illinois. The house was built in 1854 for Dr. William Burns, Polo's first medical doctor and one of its most prominent early citizens. After working as a traveling doctor, Burns began practicing in nearby Buffalo Grove in 1848; like much of Buffalo Grove, he moved to Polo after an Illinois Central Railroad station opened there. Burns' house, the first brick house in the city, had a vernacular gable front plan; such homes were popular at the time, especially in newly formed railroad towns. Burns lived in the house until he moved to a larger one in 1868; he went on to serve as Polo's mayor, a town council and school board member, and a financial benefactor of the city.

The house was added to the National Register of Historic Places on August 27, 2018.
