= Charles W. Baker =

American judge

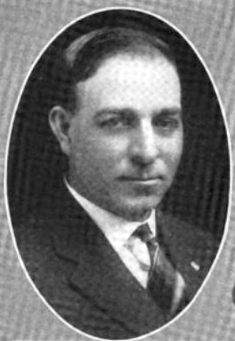

Member of the Illinois Senate
- In office 1926–1956

Member of the Illinois House of Representatives
- In office 1916–1926

Personal details
- Born: July 10, 1876 Monroe Center, Illinois, US
- Died: February 26, 1963 (aged 86) Rockford, Illinois, US
- Party: Republican
- Occupation: Politician

Charles W. Baker (July 10, 1876 – February 26, 1963) was an American farmer and politician.

== Biography ==
Baker was born in Monroe Center, Ogle County, Illinois. He owned a farm in Davis Junction, Illinois. He served as a township tax collector and road commissioner. Baker served on the Ogle County Board and was a Republican. He served in the Illinois House of Representatives from 1917 to 1926 and then served in the Illinois Senate from 1927 to 1956. Baker and his wife then moved to Rockford, Illinois. He fell and fractured his hip, at his home, on January 21, 1963; subsequently he became ill and later died at St. Anthony's Hospital in Rockford.
