= Jeremiah Davis =

American politician

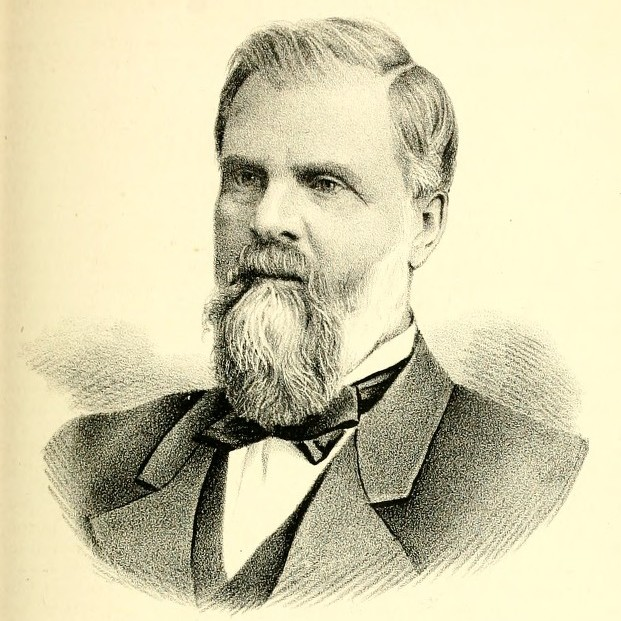

Member of the Illinois House of Representatives from the 86th district
- In office 1870 – 1872

Personal details
- Born: June 12, 1826 Hornellsville, New York
- Died: September 22, 1910 (aged 84) Rockford, Illinois
- Party: Republican
- Profession: farmer and prospector

Jeremiah Davis (June 12, 1826 – September 22, 1910) was an American pioneer, politician, and farmer from New York. He achieved significant wealth in the California Gold Rush and invested his money in a large tract of land in Ogle County, Illinois. The town of Davis Junction there was named in his honor. Davis also served a term in the Illinois House of Representatives.

== Biography ==
Davis was born in Hornellsville, New York on June 12, 1826. He moved with his parents to Milton, Wisconsin, attending the public schools. Upon graduating, he purchased an 80-acre (32 ha) farm, which he cultivated until 1850. He participated in the California Gold Rush and became wealthy after discovering a gold vein near Georgetown, California. He returned to Milton after a year, again maintaining his farm. Davis married Jane Goodrich on April 20, 1852, and co-founded Milton Academy with her father, Joseph Goodrich, in 1853. In 1859, Davis purchased a 1,100-acre (450 ha) tract of land in Ogle County, Illinois.

He served on the Scott Township Board of Supervisors for ten years. In 1870, he was elected as a Republican to the Illinois House of Representatives, serving one two-year term. Davis managed to convince the Chicago & Iowa Railroad and the Chicago, Milwaukee, St. Paul and Pacific Railroad (Milwaukee Road) to run their tracks through his land. The town of Davis Junction was founded and named after him in 1875.

In 1881, Davis moved to Rockford where he became director of the Forest City Insurance Company and the Rockford National Bank. Davis also served as treasurer of the Rock River Butter Company. He was elected to the Rockford city council as alderman from the first ward in 1885. He served on the original board of the Rockford Memorial Hospital.

Davis had eight children. He was active in Freemasonry and was a member of the Western Society of California Pioneers. He died on September 22, 1910.
