= Rochelle Downtown Historic District =

- U.S. National Register of Historic Places
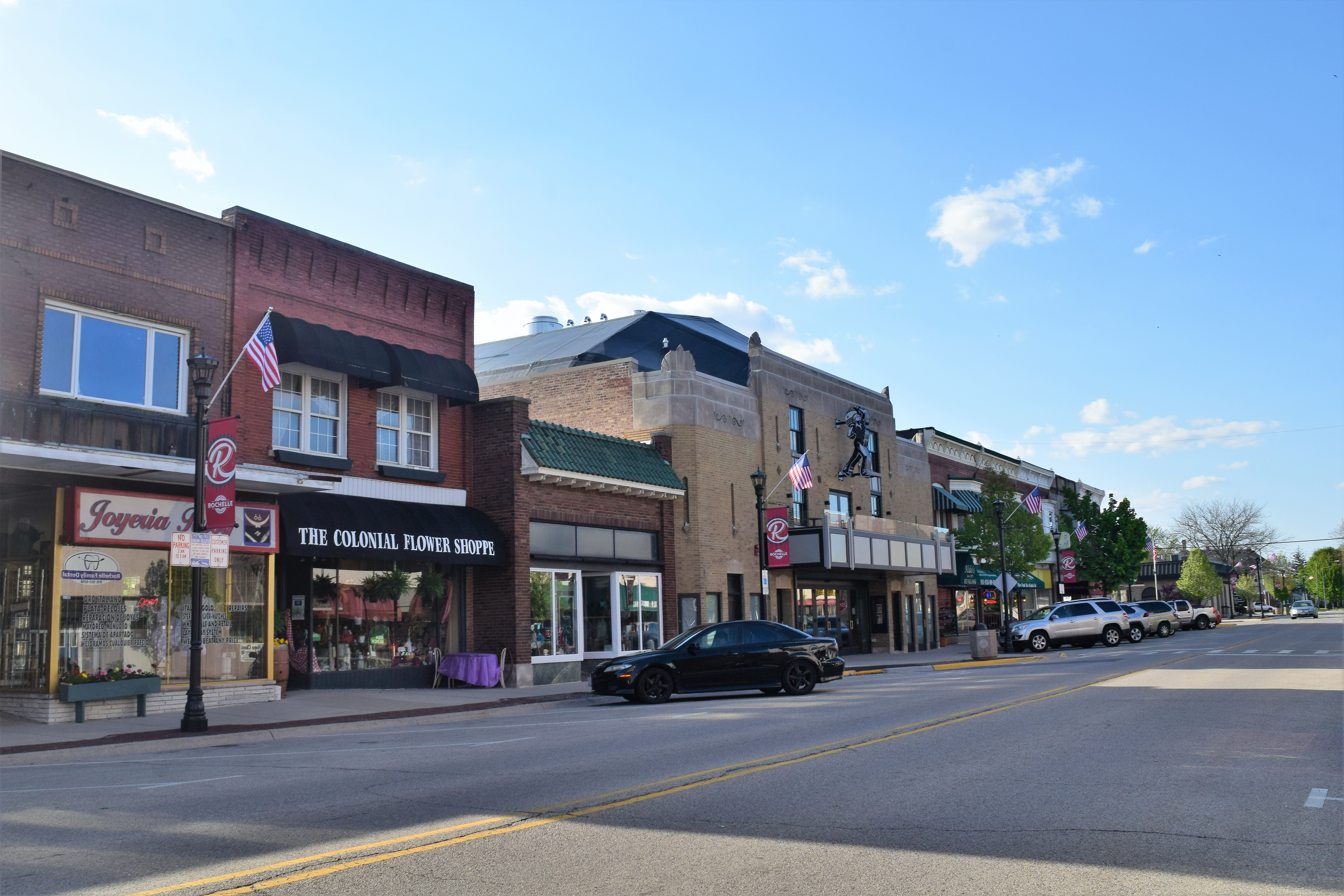
- Buildings on the 400 block of Lincoln Highway in the district

- Location within Illinois Location within the United States
- Location: Primarily 300-400 blks. Lincoln Hwy, 400 blk. Cherry & 400-500 blks. W. 4th Aves., 400 blk. Dewey & 300 blk. N. 6th Sts., Rochelle, Illinois
- Coordinates: 41°55′20″N 89°03′59″W
- NRHP reference No.: 100003265
- Added to NRHP: December 31, 2018

The Rochelle Downtown Historic District is a national historic district in downtown Rochelle, Illinois. The district includes 56 buildings, most of which are commercial buildings. Commercial development in Rochelle began in the 1850s, but several fires burned down all of the earliest buildings; the oldest surviving buildings in the district were built in 1871. Development in the district continued through the mid-twentieth century. While a variety of architectural styles can be found in the district, Italianate and vernacular commercial designs are the most common. Noteworthy non-commercial buildings in the district include the City and Town Hall, U.S. Post Office, Masonic Temple, and Chicago & North Western Railway depot.

The district was added to the National Register of Historic Places on December 31, 2018.
