= Battle of Collierville =

Battle of Collierville may refer to any of 4 minor engagements that occurred near Collierville, Tennessee in the fall of 1863 during the American Civil War, including most commonly:

- First Battle of Collierville, or the Battle at the Collierville Depot, October 11, 1863
- Second Battle of Collierville, November 3, 1863

== See also ==
- Tennessee in the American Civil War
