= William Moats Farm =

- U.S. National Register of Historic Places
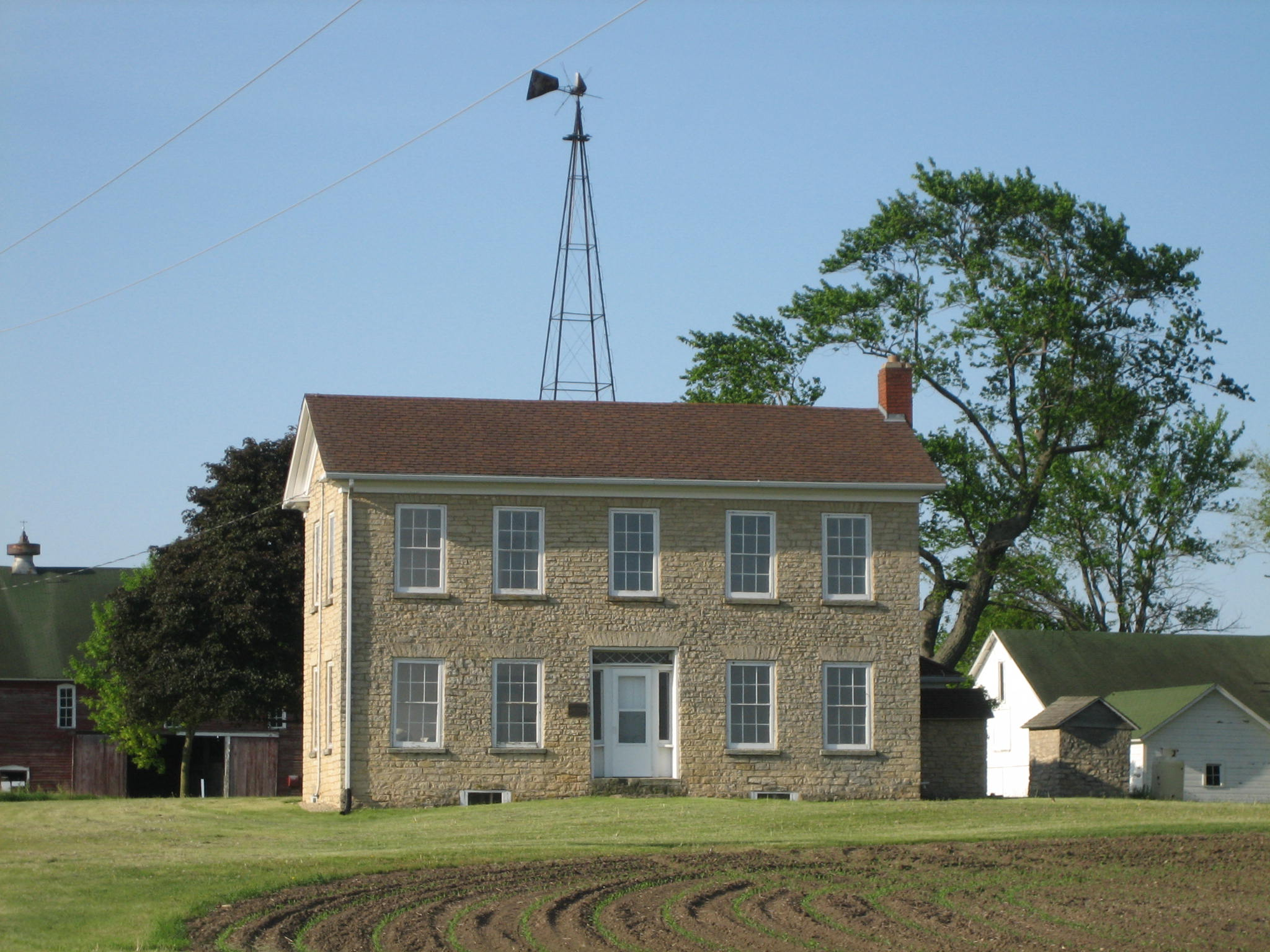
- The house at the William Moats Farm in rural Ogle County.

- Location within Illinois Location within the United States
- Location: Ogle County, Illinois
- Nearest city: Ashton
- Coordinates: 42°7′38″N 89°15′39″W
- Area: 5.1 acres (2.1 ha)
- Built: 1844
- Architect: Stoddard
- Architectural style: I-house
- NRHP reference No.: 86003724
- Added to NRHP: February 12, 1987

The William Moats Farm, near Ashton, Illinois, United States, is listed on the National Register of Historic Places. Located in Ogle County, Illinois, the farm is the only National Register listing in or around Ashton.

== Architecture ==
The William Moats Farm house is an example of an I-house style construction. the house was built around 1844 and designed by an architect named Stoddard. The Moats House sits on a stone foundation and is constructed from mostly stone, but incorporates weatherboard and brick into its construction as well.

== Outbuildings ==
The National Register of Historic Places listing for William Moats Farm includes the house and three other contributing properties. A smoke house is on the property, it was built, along with the house, in 1844. A gable-roofed barn was erected on the property in 1900 and is clad in weatherboard. A third structure, classified as an "energy facility", the windmill, was built in 1930.

== Significance ==
The William Moats Farm was listed on the National Register of Historic Places on February 12, 1987 for its significance in the areas of agriculture and architecture.
