= Scott Township =

Scott Township may refer to:

== Canada ==
- Scott Township, Ontario, a geographic township and former municipality

== United States ==
=== Arkansas ===
- Scott Township, Lonoke County, Arkansas, in Lonoke County, Arkansas
- Scott Township, Mississippi County, Arkansas, in Mississippi County, Arkansas
- Scott Township, Poinsett County, Arkansas, in Poinsett County, Arkansas
- Scott Township, Sharp County, Arkansas, in Sharp County, Arkansas

=== Illinois ===
- Scott Township, Champaign County, Illinois
- Scott Township, Ogle County, Illinois

=== Indiana ===
- Scott Township, Kosciusko County, Indiana
- Scott Township, Montgomery County, Indiana
- Scott Township, Steuben County, Indiana
- Scott Township, Vanderburgh County, Indiana

=== Iowa ===
- Scott Township, Buena Vista County, Iowa
- Scott Township, Fayette County, Iowa
- Scott Township, Floyd County, Iowa
- Scott Township, Franklin County, Iowa
- Scott Township, Fremont County, Iowa
- Scott Township, Hamilton County, Iowa
- Scott Township, Henry County, Iowa
- Scott Township, Johnson County, Iowa
- Scott Township, Madison County, Iowa
- Scott Township, Mahaska County, Iowa
- Scott Township, Montgomery County, Iowa
- Scott Township, Poweshiek County, Iowa

=== Kansas ===
- Scott Township, Bourbon County, Kansas
- Scott Township, Lincoln County, Kansas, in Lincoln County, Kansas
- Scott Township, Linn County, Kansas, in Linn County, Kansas
- Scott Township, Scott County, Kansas, in Scott County, Kansas

=== Minnesota ===
- Scott Township, Stevens County, Minnesota

=== Missouri ===
- Scott Township, Taney County, Missouri

=== Nebraska ===
- Scott Township, Buffalo County, Nebraska
- Scott Township, Holt County, Nebraska

=== North Dakota ===
- Scott Township, Adams County, North Dakota

=== Ohio ===
- Scott Township, Adams County, Ohio
- Scott Township, Brown County, Ohio
- Scott Township, Marion County, Ohio
- Scott Township, Sandusky County, Ohio

=== Pennsylvania ===
- Scott Township, Allegheny County, Pennsylvania
- Scott Township, Columbia County, Pennsylvania
- Scott Township, Lackawanna County, Pennsylvania
- Scott Township, Lawrence County, Pennsylvania
- Scott Township, Wayne County, Pennsylvania

== See also ==
- Scott (disambiguation)
