= Davis Junction, Illinois =

Davis Junction
- Village
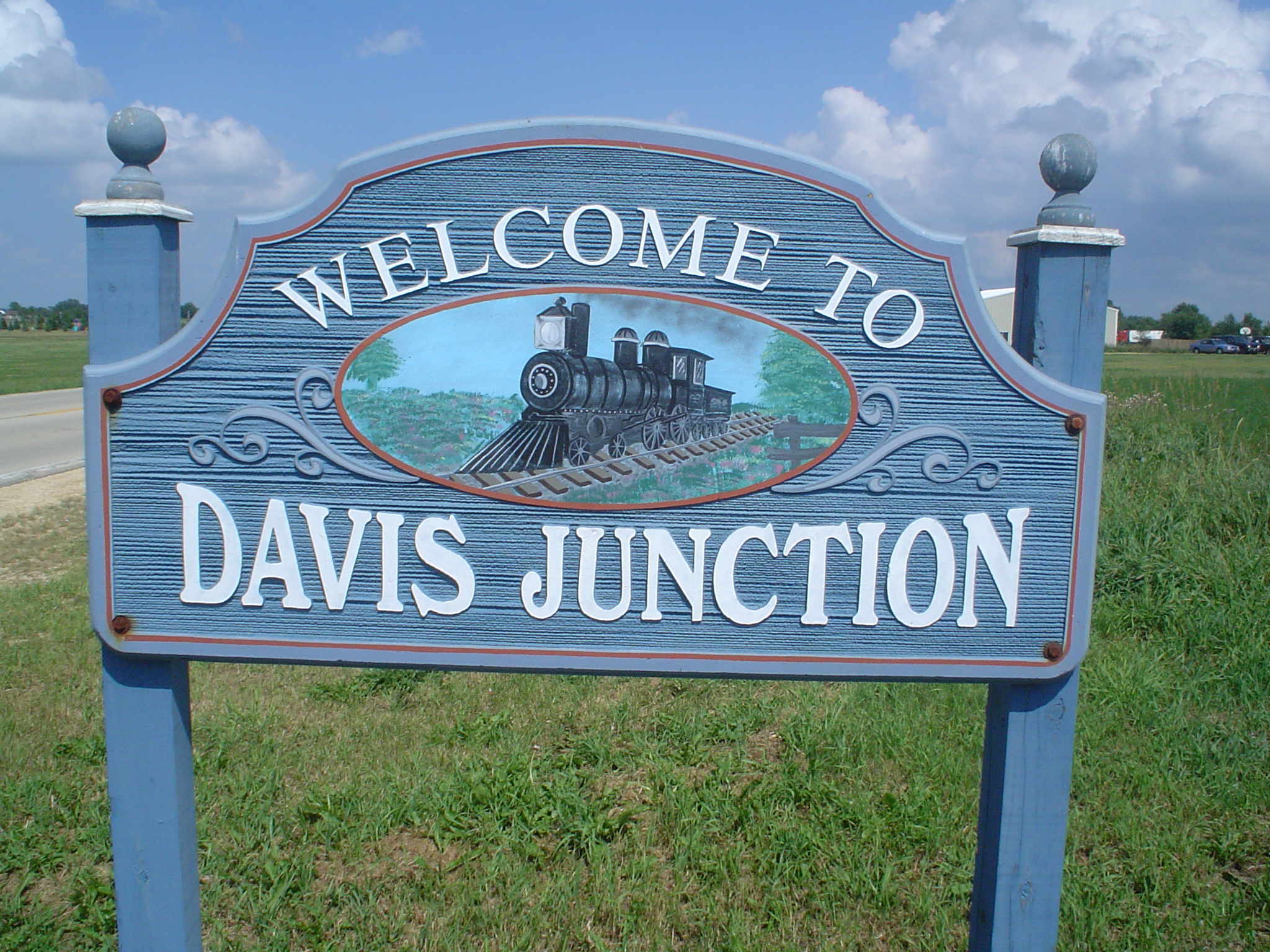
- Sign leading into the west side of the village

- Location of Davis Junction in Ogle County, Illinois.

- Location within Ogle County Davis Junction (Illinois)
- Coordinates: 42°07′35″N 89°05′17″W
- Country: United States
- State: Illinois
- County: Ogle
- Township: Scott

Area
  - Total: 4.20 sq mi (10.88 km^{2})
  - Land: 4.20 sq mi (10.88 km^{2})
  - Water: 0 sq mi (0.00 km^{2})
- Elevation: 787 ft (240 m)

Population (2020)
  - Total: 2,512
  - Density: 598.1/sq mi (230.91/km^{2})
- Time zone: UTC-6 (CST)
  - Summer (DST): UTC-5 (CDT)
- Postal code: 61020
- Area code: 815
- FIPS code: 17-18719
- GNIS feature ID: 2398688
- Website: www.davisjunction.com

Davis Junction is a village in Ogle County, Illinois, United States. The population was 2,512 at the 2020 census. Named for Jeremiah Davis, it is located where the Illinois Railway Rockford Line and the Canadian Pacific Railway (ex-Milwaukee Road/Soo Line Railroad) Chicago Subdivision intersect along Illinois Route 72.

== History ==
Jeremiah Davis laid out Davis Junction in the 1870s, and named the settlement for himself. A post office has been in operation at Davis Junction since 1875.

== Geography ==
According to the 2010 census, Davis Junction has a total area of 4.24 square miles (10.98 km^{2}), all land.

== Demographics ==
Historical population
Census	Pop.	Note	%±
1980	289		—
1990	246		−14.9%
2000	491		99.6%
2010	2,373		383.3%
2020	2,512		5.9%
U.S. Decennial Census

=== 2020 census ===
As of the 2020 census, Davis Junction had a population of 2,512. The median age was 33.3 years. 30.9% of residents were under the age of 18 and 7.4% of residents were 65 years of age or older. For every 100 females there were 101.9 males, and for every 100 females age 18 and over there were 100.3 males age 18 and over.

0.0% of residents lived in urban areas, while 100.0% lived in rural areas.

There were 802 households in Davis Junction, of which 47.6% had children under the age of 18 living in them. Of all households, 61.0% were married-couple households, 12.8% were households with a male householder and no spouse or partner present, and 16.7% were households with a female householder and no spouse or partner present. About 15.2% of all households were made up of individuals and 6.0% had someone living alone who was 65 years of age or older.

There were 866 housing units, of which 7.4% were vacant. The homeowner vacancy rate was 3.4% and the rental vacancy rate was 6.7%.

Racial composition as of the 2020 census
Race	Number	Percent
White	2,091	83.2%
Black or African American	37	1.5%
American Indian and Alaska Native	10	0.4%
Asian	9	0.4%
Native Hawaiian and Other Pacific Islander	0	0.0%
Some other race	140	5.6%
Two or more races	225	9.0%
Hispanic or Latino (of any race)	396	15.8%

=== 2000 census ===
As of the census of 2000, there were 491 people, 165 households, and 132 families residing in Davis Junction. The population density was 129.6 inhabitants per square mile (50.0/km^{2}). There were 172 housing units at an average density of 45.4 per square mile (17.5/km^{2}). The racial makeup of the village was 98.37% White, 0.41% Asian, 0.41% from other races, and 0.81% from two or more races. Hispanic or Latino of any race were 1.02% of the population.

There were 165 households, out of which 47.9% had children under the age of 18 living with them, 66.7% were married couples living together, 7.3% had a female householder with no husband present, and 20.0% were non-families. 15.8% of all households were made up of individuals, and 6.7% had someone living alone who was 65 years of age or older. The average household size was 2.98 and the average family size was 3.37.

In the village, the population was spread out, with 34.0% under the age of 18, 6.5% from 18 to 24, 37.9% from 25 to 44, 13.8% from 45 to 64, and 7.7% who were 65 years of age or older. The median age was 31 years. For every 100 females, there were 107.2 males. For every 100 females age 18 and over, there were 97.6 males.

The median income for a household in the village was $47,375, and the median income for a family was $51,250. Males had a median income of $36,875 versus $22,917 for females. The per capita income for the village was $16,915. About 2.5% of families and 2.6% of the population were below the poverty line, including none of those under age 18 and 23.1% of those age 65 or over.

== Education ==
It is in the Meridian Community Unit School District 223.

== Notable person ==
- Charles W. Baker (1876–1963), Illinois state legislator and farmer, owned a farm in Davis Junction.
