= Monroe Township, Illinois =

Monroe Township
- Township
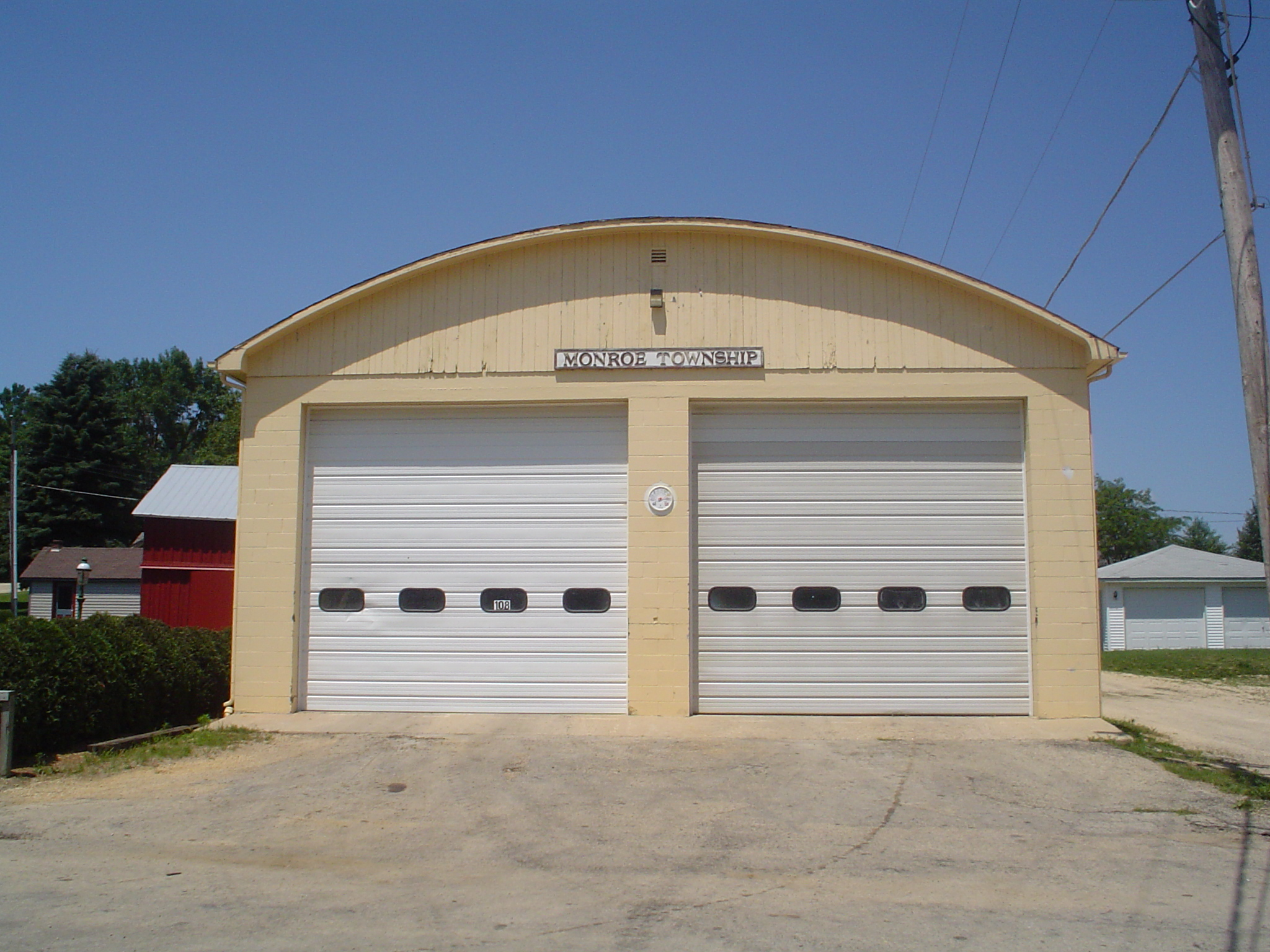
- Monroe Township building located in Monroe Center.

- Location of Illinois in the United States
- Coordinates: 42°05′58″N 88°59′57″W
- Country: United States
- State: Illinois
- County: Ogle
- Organized: November 6, 1849

Government
  - Mayor: Thomas Lichty

Area
  - Total: 36.13 sq mi (93.6 km^{2})
  - Land: 36.12 sq mi (93.6 km^{2})
  - Water: 0 sq mi (0 km^{2})
- Elevation: 866 ft (264 m)

Population (2010)
  - Estimate (2016): 1,500
  - Density: 43.3/sq mi (16.7/km^{2})
- Time zone: UTC-6 (CST)
  - Summer (DST): UTC-5 (CDT)
- FIPS code: 17-141-50049

Monroe Township is located in Ogle County, Illinois. As of the 2010 census, its population was 1,563 and it contained 613 housing units.

== Geography ==
According to the 2010 census, the township has a total area of 36.13 square miles (93.6 km^{2}), all land.

== Demographics ==
Historical population
Census	Pop.	Note	%±
2016 (est.)	1,500
U.S. Decennial Census
