= Scott Township, Kosciusko County, Indiana =

Scott Township
- Township
- Coordinates: 41°23′08″N 86°01′23″W
- Country: United States
- State: Indiana
- County: Kosciusko

Government
  - Type: Indiana township

Area
  - Total: 23.39 sq mi (60.6 km^{2})
  - Land: 23.35 sq mi (60.5 km^{2})
  - Water: 0.04 sq mi (0.10 km^{2})
- Elevation: 827 ft (252 m)

Population (2020)
  - Total: 1,757
  - Density: 72.6/sq mi (28.0/km^{2})
- Time zone: UTC-5 (Eastern (EST))
  - Summer (DST): UTC-4 (EDT)
- FIPS code: 18-68400
- GNIS feature ID: 453836

Historical population
| Census | Pop. | Note | %± |
|---|---|---|---|
| 1920 | 893 | | — |
| 1930 | 888 | | −0.6% |
| 1940 | 918 | | 3.4% |
| 1950 | 956 | | 4.1% |
| 1960 | 938 | | −1.9% |
| 1970 | 957 | | 2.0% |
| 1980 | 1,190 | | 24.3% |
| 1990 | 1,272 | | 6.9% |
| 2000 | 1,618 | | 27.2% |
| 2010 | 1,696 | | 4.8% |
| 2020 | 1,757 | | 3.6% |
US Census:

Scott Township is one of seventeen townships in Kosciusko County, Indiana. As of the 2020 census, its population was 1,757 (up from 1,696 at 2010) and it contained 528 housing units.

Scott Township was organized in 1848.

== Geography ==
According to the 2010 census, the township has a total area of 23.39 square miles (60.6 km^{2}), of which 23.35 square miles (60.5 km^{2}) (or 99.83%) is land and 0.04 square miles (0.10 km^{2}) (or 0.17%) is water.
