= Henry D. Barber House =

Historic house in Illinois, United States

- U.S. National Register of Historic Places
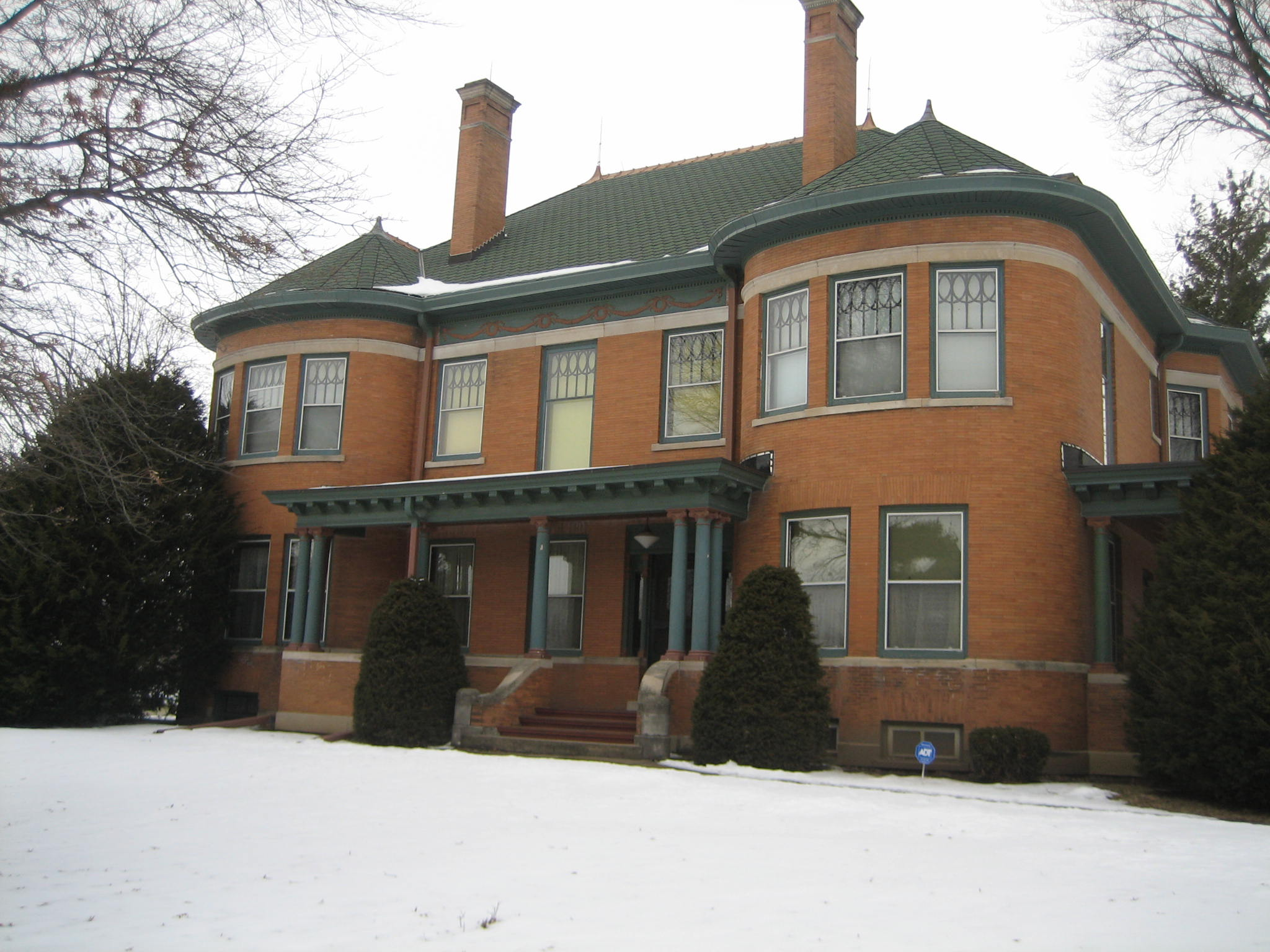
- The Henry D. Barber House in Polo, Illinois.

- Location within Illinois Location within the United States
- Location: 410 W. Mason St., Polo, Illinois
- Coordinates: 41°59′13″N 89°34′38″W
- Area: 0.7 acres (0.28 ha)
- Built: 1891
- Architect: Joseph Lyman Silsbee
- Architectural style: Classical Revival/Romanesque Revival
- NRHP reference No.: 74000770
- Added to NRHP: March 28, 1974

The Henry D. Barber House is a Registered Historic Place in the Ogle County, Illinois city of Polo. The Henry Barber House joined the Register in March 1974. It was designed by Joseph Lyman Silsbee, acclaimed Chicago architect and employer/mentor to Frank Lloyd Wright. The structure, also known as Silsbee's Barber Mansion, was designed for Henry D. Barber, prominent citizen and banker in Polo, Illinois.

The house retains its original features, including a glass mosaic fireplace designed by Louis Tiffany. Hand carved corbels highlight solid old wood columns in the foyer. Windows unique to this house were designed by Silsbee; they feature intersecting circles and are made of solid wood and individual panes of glass in the design. A carriage deck remains on the side porch. This extended portion of the porch floor allowed for the easy transition from porch to carriage (or horse). Two cisterns and a well exist on the property, and mechanical components for drawing and using stored water are present. Each of the eight fireplaces have hand-carved mantels that are unique to the individual rooms, as well as intricately detailed cast iron fireplace inserts. Each room, including the coat closets and butlers pantries, have working radiators that are highly decorative and original to the house. The Silsbee's Barber Mansion was a custom design for Henry Barber and is one of a kind.

It is the first Silsbee design to be placed on the NRHP.

== Architecture ==
The Henry D. Barber House was constructed around 1891 and underwent some minor alterations in 1899. Cast in Classical Revival style, the brick and limestone Barber House was designed by Chicago architect Joseph Lyman Silsbee.

== Significance ==
The Henry D. Barber House was listed on the National Register of Historic Places on March 28, 1974, for its significance in the area of architecture. Joseph Lyman Silsbee, prominent architect of many Chicago structures including the Lincoln Park Conservatory and the interior of the ‘Palmer Castle’ of Bertha and Potter Palmer of the Palmer House in Chicago, designed this house.
