= Ashton, Illinois =

- Village
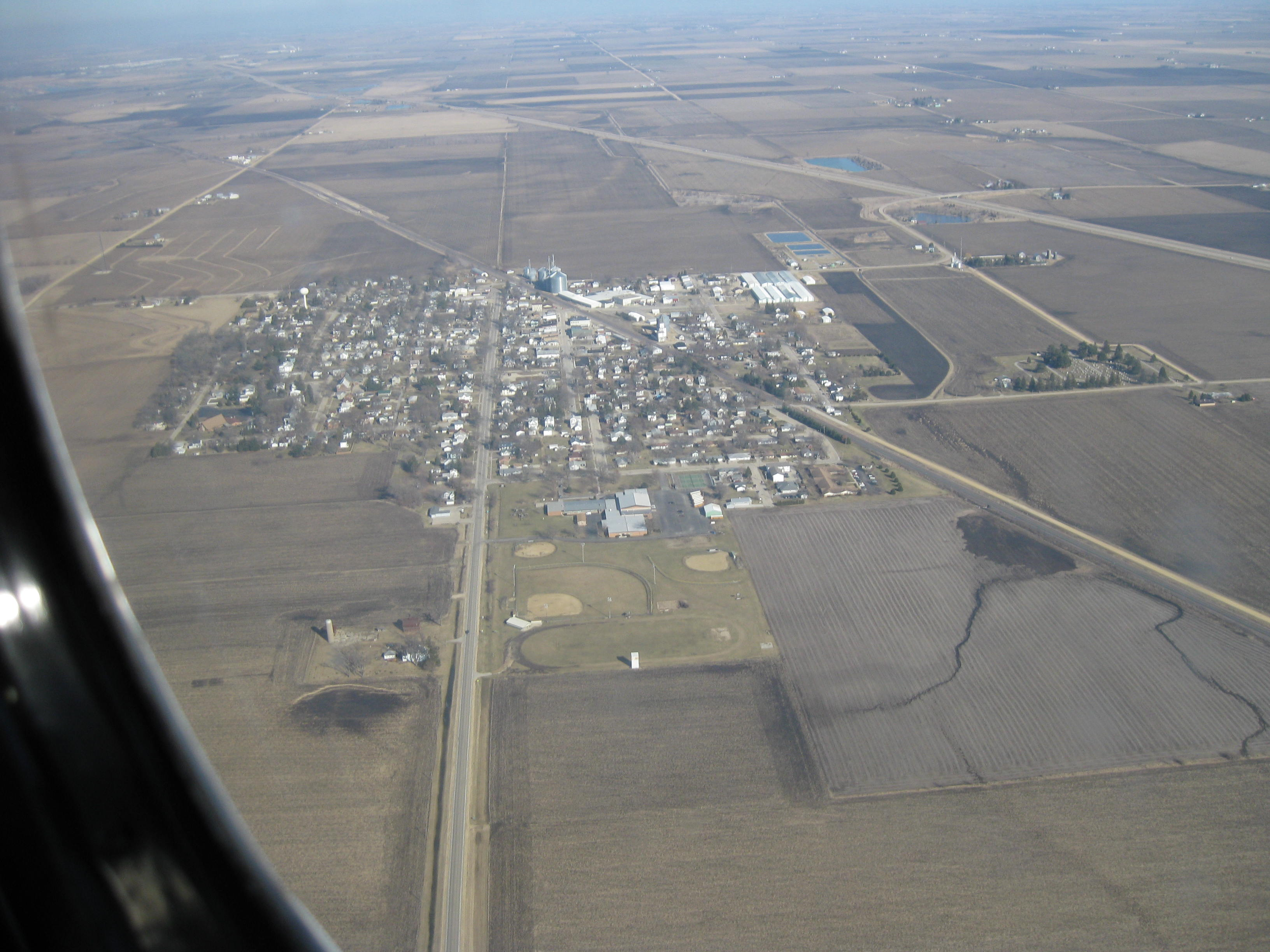
- Aerial view - March 2009

- Location of Ashton in Lee County, Illinois.
- Coordinates: 41°52′06″N 89°13′21″W
- Country: United States
- State: Illinois
- County: Lee County

Area
  - Total: 0.67 sq mi (1.74 km^{2})
  - Land: 0.67 sq mi (1.74 km^{2})
  - Water: 0 sq mi (0.00 km^{2})
- Elevation: 860 ft (260 m)

Population (2020)
  - Total: 967
  - Density: 1,442.8/sq mi (557.07/km^{2})
- Time zone: UTC-6 (CST)
  - Summer (DST): UTC-5 (CDT)
- ZIP Code: 61006
- Area code: 815
- FIPS code: 17-02583
- GNIS feature ID: 2397999
- Website: www.ashtonusa.com

Ashton is a village in Lee County, Illinois, United States. As of the 2020 census, Ashton had a population of 967.

== History ==
Ashton was originally called Ogle Station, but it was afterwards changed in order to avoid confusion with Ogle County, Illinois. A tornado hit the town on April 9, 2015 at 6:40 pm CDT.

== Geography ==
According to the 2021 census gazetteer files, Ashton has a total area of 0.67 square miles (1.74 km^{2}), all land.

== Demographics ==
Historical population
Census	Pop.	Note	%±
1880	646		—
1890	680		5.3%
1900	756		11.2%
1910	779		3.0%
1920	882		13.2%
1930	868		−1.6%
1940	914		5.3%
1950	913		−0.1%
1960	1,024		12.2%
1970	1,112		8.6%
1980	1,140		2.5%
1990	1,042		−8.6%
2000	1,142		9.6%
2010	972		−14.9%
2020	967		−0.5%
U.S. Decennial Census

As of the 2020 census there were 967 people, 372 households, and 219 families residing in the village. The population density was 1,443.28 inhabitants per square mile (557.25/km^{2}). There were 440 housing units at an average density of 656.72 per square mile (253.56/km^{2}). The racial makeup of the village was 89.76% White, 1.24% African American, 0.00% Native American, 0.52% Asian, 0.00% Pacific Islander, 1.24% from other races, and 7.24% from two or more races. Hispanic or Latino of any race were 4.45% of the population.

There were 372 households, out of which 23.9% had children under the age of 18 living with them, 45.43% were married couples living together, 5.65% had a female householder with no husband present, and 41.13% were non-families. 34.14% of all households were made up of individuals, and 11.02% had someone living alone who was 65 years of age or older. The average household size was 2.78 and the average family size was 2.17.

The village's age distribution consisted of 17.0% under the age of 18, 6.9% from 18 to 24, 23.5% from 25 to 44, 37.5% from 45 to 64, and 15.1% who were 65 years of age or older. The median age was 45.9 years. For every 100 females, there were 104.2 males. For every 100 females age 18 and over, there were 111.7 males.

The median income for a household in the village was $53,125, and the median income for a family was $69,792. Males had a median income of $44,583 versus $22,391 for females. The per capita income for the village was $26,755. About 8.7% of families and 15.5% of the population were below the poverty line, including 21.0% of those under age 18 and 7.2% of those age 65 or over.

== Education ==
It is in the Ashton Community Unit School District 275.

== See also ==
- William Moats Farm
