= Scott Township, Ogle County, Illinois =

Scott Township
- Township
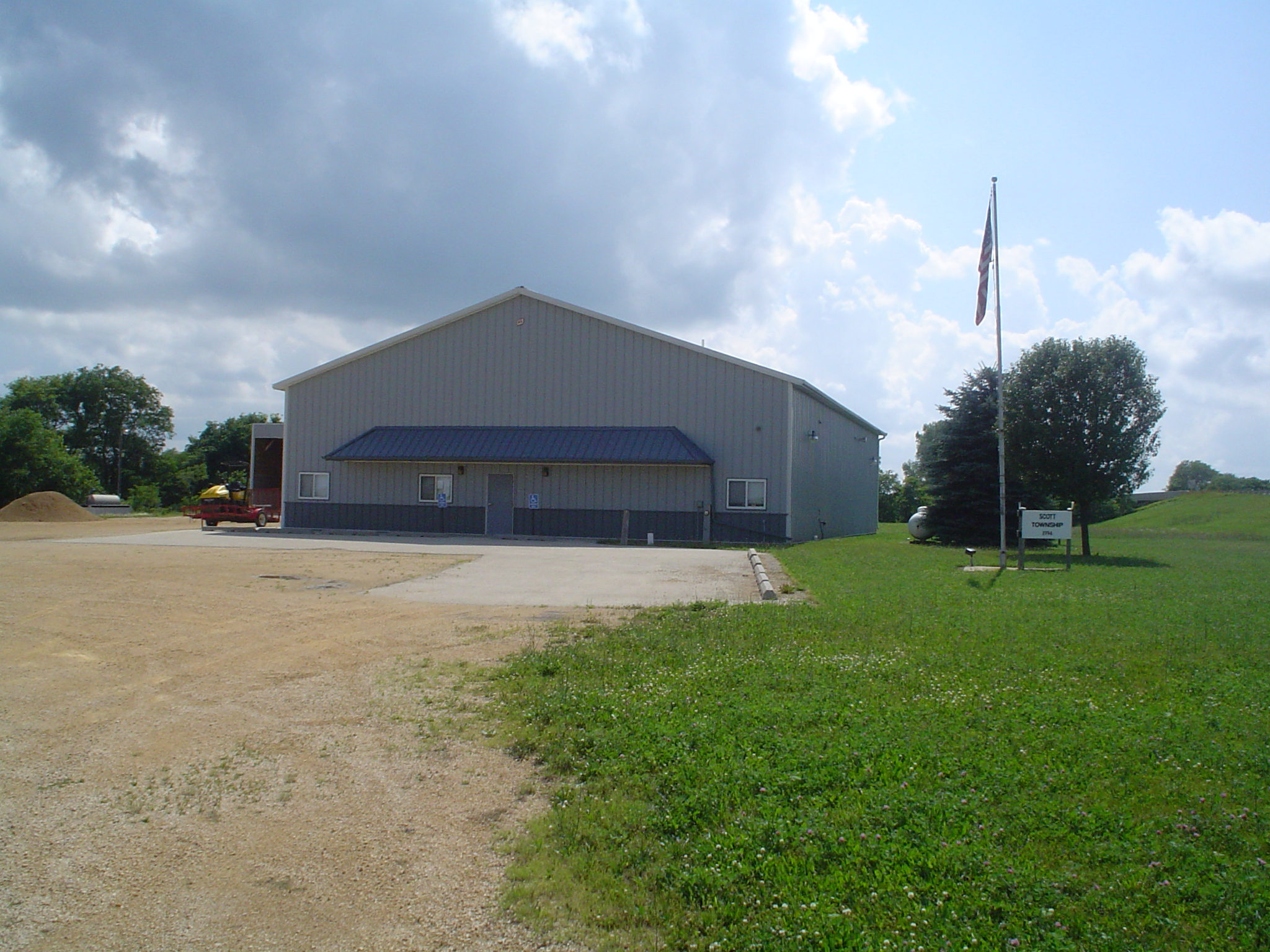
- Scott Township Building.

- Location of Illinois in the United States
- Coordinates: 42°06′25″N 89°06′52″W
- Country: United States
- State: Illinois
- County: Ogle
- Organized: November 6, 1849

Government
  - Mayor: Robert L. Horn

Area
  - Total: 35.91 sq mi (93.0 km^{2})
  - Land: 35.91 sq mi (93.0 km^{2})
  - Water: 0 sq mi (0 km^{2})
- Elevation: 574 ft (175 m)

Population (2010)
  - Estimate (2016): 3,026
  - Density: 88.6/sq mi (34.2/km^{2})
- Time zone: UTC-6 (CST)
  - Summer (DST): UTC-5 (CDT)
- FIPS code: 17-141-68302

Scott Township is located in Ogle County, Illinois. As of the 2010 census, its population was 3,181 and it contained 1,104 housing units.

== Geography ==
According to the 2010 census, the township has a total area of 35.91 square miles (93.0 km^{2}), all land.

== Demographics ==
Historical population
Census	Pop.	Note	%±
2016 (est.)	3,026
U.S. Decennial Census
