= Polo, Illinois =

Polo
- City
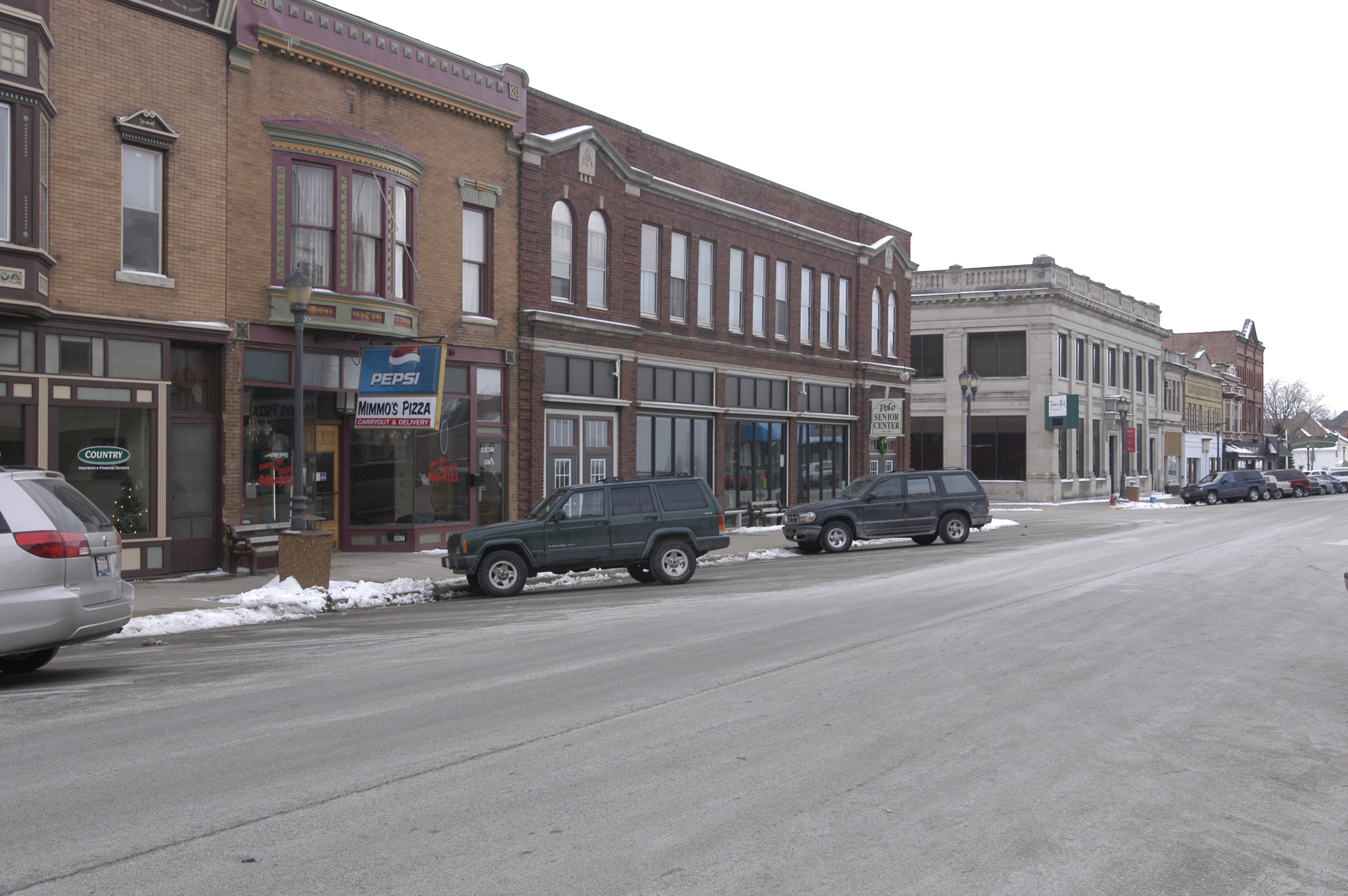
- Downtown Polo

- Flag Logo
- Motto: Gateway to the Pines
- Location of Polo in Ogle County, Illinois.
- Coordinates: 41°59′05″N 89°34′50″W
- Country: United States
- State: Illinois
- County: Ogle
- Township: Buffalo

Area
  - Total: 1.45 sq mi (3.76 km^{2})
  - Land: 1.45 sq mi (3.76 km^{2})
  - Water: 0 sq mi (0.00 km^{2})
- Elevation: 863 ft (263 m)

Population (2020)
  - Total: 2,291
  - Density: 1,578.4/sq mi (609.44/km^{2})
- Time zone: UTC-6 (CST)
  - Summer (DST): UTC-5 (CDT)
- Postal code: 61064
- Area code: 815
- FIPS code: 17-60937
- GNIS feature ID: 2396246
- Website: www.poloil.gov

Polo is a city in Ogle County, Illinois, United States. The population was 2,291 at the 2020 census, down from 2,355 in 2010 and 2,477 in 2000.

== History ==
The community was named after Marco Polo. Polo was incorporated on February 16, 1857.

== Geography ==
According to the 2010 census, Polo has a total area of 1.36 square miles (3.52 km^{2}), all land.

== Demographics ==
Historical population
Census	Pop.	Note	%±
1870	1,805		—
1880	1,819		0.8%
1890	1,728		−5.0%
1900	1,869		8.2%
1910	1,828		−2.2%
1920	1,867		2.1%
1930	1,871		0.2%
1940	2,071		10.7%
1950	2,242		8.3%
1960	2,552		13.8%
1970	2,542		−0.4%
1980	2,643		4.0%
1990	2,514		−4.9%
2000	2,477		−1.5%
2010	2,355		−4.9%
2020	2,291		−2.7%
U.S. Decennial Census

=== 2020 census ===
As of the 2020 census, Polo had a population of 2,291. The median age was 41.3 years. 22.6% of residents were under the age of 18 and 19.7% of residents were 65 years of age or older. For every 100 females there were 94.6 males, and for every 100 females age 18 and over there were 94.0 males age 18 and over.

0.0% of residents lived in urban areas, while 100.0% lived in rural areas.

There were 965 households in Polo, of which 29.2% had children under the age of 18 living in them. Of all households, 42.1% were married-couple households, 19.2% were households with a male householder and no spouse or partner present, and 28.4% were households with a female householder and no spouse or partner present. About 32.5% of all households were made up of individuals and 14.8% had someone living alone who was 65 years of age or older.

There were 1,076 housing units, of which 10.3% were vacant. The homeowner vacancy rate was 1.2% and the rental vacancy rate was 10.3%.

Racial composition as of the 2020 census
Race	Number	Percent
White	2,145	93.6%
Black or African American	13	0.6%
American Indian and Alaska Native	11	0.5%
Asian	3	0.1%
Native Hawaiian and Other Pacific Islander	0	0.0%
Some other race	15	0.7%
Two or more races	104	4.5%
Hispanic or Latino (of any race)	110	4.8%

=== 2000 census ===
As of the census of 2000, there were 2,477 people, 1,007 households, and 654 families residing in the city. The population density was 1,886.2 inhabitants per square mile (728.3/km^{2}). There were 1,081 housing units at an average density of 823.2 per square mile (317.8/km^{2}). The racial makeup of the city was 98.39% White, 0.04% African American, 0.20% Native American, 0.32% Asian, 0.04% Pacific Islander, 0.65% from other races, and 0.36% from two or more races. Hispanic or Latino of any race were 1.57% of the population.

There were 1,007 households, out of which 31.3% had children under the age of 18 living with them, 51.5% were married couples living together, 10.1% had a female householder with no husband present, and 35.0% were non-families. 31.0% of all households were made up of individuals, and 16.0% had someone living alone who was 65 years of age or older. The average household size was 2.40 and the average family size was 3.00.

In the city, the population was spread out, with 25.1% under the age of 18, 7.4% from 18 to 24, 26.8% from 25 to 44, 21.3% from 45 to 64, and 19.5% who were 65 years of age or older. The median age was 40 years. For every 100 females, there were 91.4 males. For every 100 females age 18 and over, there were 87.1 males.

The median income for a household in the city was $38,833, and the median income for a family was $46,250. Males had a median income of $37,857 versus $24,135 for females. The per capita income for the city was $18,604. About 7.2% of families and 9.2% of the population were below the poverty line, including 11.2% of those under age 18 and 10.0% of those age 65 or over.

== Education ==
Polo is within the Polo School District 222, which includes Polo Community High School, Aplington Middle School (grades 6–8) and Centennial Elementary School (preschool-grade 5).

Christ Lutheran School, located in nearby Sterling, serves students of various religious backgrounds from Polo to Walnut and from Morrison to Dixon. As part of the largest network of Protestant schools in the US, CLS provides an education for students from age 3 through 8th grade that is focused on all of the core academic subjects while remaining true to the Bible.

=== Library ===
The Polo Public Library at 302 West Mason Street in Polo is operated by the Polo Public Library District. The building is one of several Carnegie libraries on the National Register of Historic Places. The library was established in 1871 as an association which charged a membership fee. It was renamed Buffalo Township Free Public Library in 1891.

== Notable people ==
- George Peek, economist
- George Perkins Clinton, botanist and mycologist
- Sarah Hackett Stevenson, first female member of the American Medical Association
- Kathleen Weaver, writer and editor

== See also ==
- Polo, Missouri, named after Polo, Illinois
