= List of school districts in Cook County, Illinois =

This is a list of school districts in Cook County, Illinois.

This list includes school districts with any amount of territory within Cook County, even if the districts do not operate any schools nor have their administration buildings in Cook County. The list of districts includes:

== K-12 ==
- Barrington Community Unit School District 220
- Community Unit School District 300
- Chicago Public Schools
- Elgin Area School District U46
- Elmwood Park Community Unit School District 401

== Secondary ==
- Argo Community High School District 217
- Bloom Township High School District 206
- Bremen Community High School District 228
- Community High School District 218
- Consolidated High School District 230
- Evanston Township High School District 202
- Evergreen Park Community High School District 231
- Hinsdale Township High School District 86
- Homewood-Flossmoor Community High School District 233
- Lemont Township High School District 210
- Leyden Community High School District 212
- Lyons Township High School District 204
- Maine Township High School District 207
- J. Sterling Morton High School District 201
- New Trier Township High School District 203
- Niles Township Community High School District 219
- Northfield Township High School District 225
- Oak Lawn Community High School District 229
- Oak Park and River Forest District 200
- Proviso Township High School District 209
- Reavis Township High School District 220
- Rich Township High School District 227
- Ridgewood Community High School District 234
- Riverside Brookfield Township School District 208
- Thornton Fractional Township High School District 215
- Thornton Township High School District 205
- Township High School District 211
- Township High School District 214

== Elementary ==
- Alsip-Hazelgreen-Oaklawn School District 126
- Arbor Park School District 145
- Arlington Heights School District 25
- Atwood Heights School District 125
- Avoca School District 37
- Bellwood School District 88
- Berkeley School District 87
- Berwyn North School District 98
- Berwyn South School District 100
- Brookfield School District 95
- Brookwood School District 167
- Burbank School District 111
- Burnham School District 154-5
- Calumet City School District 155
- Calumet Public School District 132
- Central Stickney School District 110
- Chicago Heights School District 170
- Chicago Ridge School District 127-5
- Cicero School District 99
- Community Consolidated School District 59
- Community Consolidated School District 146
- Community Consolidated School District 168
- Cook County School District 130
- Country Club Hills School District 160
- Des Plaines Community Consolidated School District 62
- Dolton School District 149
- Dolton School District 148
- East Maine School District 63
- East Prairie School District 73
- Elementary School District 159
- Evanston/Skokie School District 65
- Evergreen Park Elementary School District 124
- Fairview South School District 72
- Flossmoor School District 161
- Ford Heights School District 169
- Forest Park School District 91
- Forest Ridge School District 142
- Franklin Park School District 84
- Glencoe School District 35
- Glenview Community Consolidated School District 34
- Golf Elementary School District 67
- Harvey School District 152
- Hazel Crest School District 152-5
- Hillside School District 93
- Hinsdale Community Consolidated School District 181
- Homewood School District 153
- Hoover-Schrum Memorial School District 157
- Indian Springs School District 109
- Kenilworth School District 38
- Kirby School District 140
- Komarek School District 94
- LaGrange School District 102
- LaGrange School District 105
- LaGrange Highlands School District 106
- Lansing School District 158
- Lemont-Bromberek Combined School District 113A
- Lincoln Elementary School District 156
- Lincolnwood School District 74
- Lindop School District 92
- Lyons School District 103
- Mannheim School District 83
- Northbrook/Glenview School District 30
- Matteson Elementary School District 162
- Maywood-Melrose Park-Broadview School District 89
- Midlothian School District 143
- Morton Grove School District 70
- Mount Prospect School District 57
- Niles Elementary School District 71
- Norridge School District 80
- North Palos School District 117
- Northbrook School District 27
- Northbrook School District 28
- Oak Lawn-Hometown School District 123
- Oak Park Elementary School District 97
- Orland School District 135
- Palatine Community Consolidated School District 15
- Palos Heights School District 128
- Palos Community Consolidated School District 118
- Park Forest-Chicago Heights School District 163
- Park Ridge Consolidated Community School District 64
- General George Patton School District 133
- Pennoyer School District 79
- Pleasantdale School District 107
- Posen-Robbins Elementary School District 143-5
- Prairie-Hills Elementary School District 144
- Prospect Heights School District 23
- Rhodes School District 84.5
- Ridgeland School District 122
- River Forest School District 90
- River Grove School District 85-5
- River Trails School District 26
- Riverside School District 96
- Rosemont Elementary School District 78
- Sandridge School District 172
- Schaumburg Community Consolidated School District 54
- Schiller Park School District 81
- Skokie School District 68
- Skokie School District 69
- Skokie School District 73½
- South Holland School District 150
- South Holland School District 151
- Steger School District 194
- Summit School District 104
- Sunnybrook School District 171
- Sunset Ridge School District 29
- Thornton School District 154
- Union Ridge School District 86
- West Harvey-Dixmoor Public School District 147
- West Northfield School District 31
- Westchester School District 92-5
- Western Springs School District 101
- Wheeling Community Consolidated School District 21
- Willow Springs School District 108
- Wilmette School District 39
- Winnetka School District 36
- Worth School District 127

== Defunct ==
- Lemont Community Consolidated School District 113 — consolidated with Bromberek School District 65 to form Lemont-Bromberek Combined School District 113A in 1990

== See also ==
- List of school districts in Illinois
