= List of school districts in Illinois =

The following is a list of school districts in Illinois. As of July 1, 2025, there were 851 public school districts, including 367 elementary districts, 96 high school districts, 387 unit districts, and one Illinois Department of Juvenile Justice district, and two cooperative high schools.

These districts are organized by regions set by the Illinois State Board of Education and not by the actual county boundaries; school districts can cross county boundaries, and school districts with administrative headquarters and/or schools only in certain counties can include territory in one or more other counties that do not have schools operated by that district.

The state classifies Chicago Public Schools as its own classification, and it classifies other school districts in other ways. All school districts are classified as separate governments by the U.S. Census Bureau, and Illinois has no school systems dependent on another layer of government.

== Region 01: Adams/Brown/Cass/Morgan/Pike/Scott ROE ==
=== Adams County ===
- Payson Community Unit School District 1
- Liberty Community Unit School District 2
- Central Community Unit School District 3
- Mendon Community Unit School District 4
- Quincy Public School District 172

=== Brown County ===
- Brown County Community Unit School District 1

=== Cass County ===
- Beardstown Community Unit School District 15
- Virginia Community Unit School District 64
- A-C Central Community Unit School District 262 (Ashland-Chandlerville)

=== Morgan County ===
- Franklin Community Unit School District 1
- Waverly Community Unit School District 6
- Meredosia-Chambersburg Community Unit School District 11
- Triopia Community Unit School District 27
- Jacksonville School District 117

=== Pike County ===
- Pleasant Hill Community Unit School District 3
- Griggsville-Perry Community Unit School District 4
- Pikeland Community Unit School District 10
- Western Community Unit School District 12

=== Scott County ===
- Winchester Community Unit School District 1
- Scott-Morgan Community Unit School District 2

== Region 03: Bond/Christian/Effingham/Fayette/Montgomery ROE ==
=== Bond County ===
- Mulberry Grove Community Unit School District 1
- Bond County Community Unit School District 2

=== Christian County ===
- Morrisonville Community Unit School District 1
- Taylorville Community Unit School District 3
- Edinburg Community Unit School District 4
- Pana Community Unit School District 8
- South Fork School District 14

=== Effingham County ===
- Altamont Community Unit School District 10
- Beecher City Community Unit School District 20
- Dieterich Community Unit School District 30
- Effingham Community Unit School District 40
- Teutopolis Community Unit School District 50

=== Fayette County ===
- Brownstown Community Unit School District 201
- Saint Elmo Community Unit School District 202
- Vandalia Community Unit School District 203
- Ramsey Community Unit School District 204

=== Montgomery County ===
- Panhandle Community Unit School District 2
- Hillsboro Community Unit School District 3
- Litchfield Community Unit School District 12
- Nokomis Community Unit School District 22

== Region 04: Boone/Winnebago ROE ==
=== Boone County ===
- Belvidere Community Unit School District 100
- North Boone Community Unit School District 200

=== Winnebago County ===
- Harlem School District 122
- Kinnikinnick Community Consolidated School District 131
- Prairie Hill Community Consolidated School District 133
- Shirland Community Consolidated School District 134
- Rockton School District 140
- Rockford Public School District 205
- Hononegah Community High School District 207
- South Beloit Community Unit School District 320, also known as "County of Winnebago School District 320"
- Pecatonica Community Unit School District 321
- Durand Community Unit School District 322
- Winnebago Community Unit School District 323

== Region 05: North Cook ISC 1 ==
=== Cook County ===
- Community Consolidated School District 15 — based in Palatine
- Wheeling Community Consolidated School District 21
- Prospect Heights School District 23
- Arlington Heights School District 25
- River Trails School District 26
- Northbrook School District 27
- Northbrook School District 28
- Sunset Ridge School District 29
- Northbrook/Glenview School District 30
- West Northfield School District 31
- Glenview Community Consolidated School District 34
- Glencoe School District 35
- Winnetka School District 36
- Avoca School District 37
- Kenilworth School District 38
- Wilmette Public Schools District 39
- Community Consolidated School District 54 — based in Schaumburg
- Mount Prospect School District 57
- Community Consolidated School District 59 — based in Arlington Heights
- Community Consolidated School District 62 — based in Des Plaines
- East Maine School District 63
- Park Ridge-Niles School District 64
- Evanston/Skokie School District 65
- Golf School District 67
- Skokie School District 68
- Skokie-Morton School District 69
- Morton Grove School District 70
- Niles Elementary School District 71
- Fairview School District 72
- East Prairie School District 73
- Skokie School District 73½
- Lincolnwood School District 74
- Evanston Township High School District 202
- New Trier Township High School District 203
- Maine Township High School District 207
- Township High School District 211 — serves Palatine and Schaumburg Townships
- Township High School District 214 — based in Arlington Heights
- Niles Township High School District 219
- Northfield Township High School District 225

== Region 06: West Cook ISC 2 ==
=== Cook County ===
- Rosemont Elementary School District 78
- Pennoyer School District 79
- Norridge School District 80
- Schiller Park School District 81
- Mannheim School District 83
- Franklin Park School District 84
- Rhodes School District 84½
- River Grove School District 85½
- Union Ridge School District 86
- Berkeley School District 87
- Bellwood School District 88
- Maywood-Melrose Park-Broadview School District 89
- River Forest Public Schools District 90
- Forest Park School District 91
- Lindop School District 92
- Westchester Public School District 92½
- Hillside School District 93
- Komarek School District 94
- Brookfield-Lagrange Park School District 95
- Riverside School District 96
- Oak Park Elementary School District 97
- Berwyn North School District 98
- Cicero School District 99
- South Berwyn School District 100
- Western Springs School District 101
- LaGrange Elementary School District 102
- Lyons School District 103
- LaGrange School District 105 South
- LaGrange Highlands School District 106
- Pleasantdale School District 107
- Oak Park and River Forest High School District 200
- J. Sterling Morton High School District 201
- Lyons Township High School District 204
- Riverside-Brookfield Township District 208
- Proviso Township High Schools District 209
- Leyden Community High School District 212
- Ridgewood Community High School District 234
- Elmwood Park Community Unit School District 401

== Region 07: South Cook ISC 4 ==
=== Cook County ===
- Cook County School District 104 — based in Summit
- Willow Springs School District 108
- Indian Springs School District 109
- Central Stickney School District 110
- Burbank School District 111
- Lemont-Bromberek Combined School District 113A
- North Palos School District 117
- Palos School District 118
- Ridgeland School District 122
- Oak Lawn-Hometown School District 123
- Evergreen Park Elementary School District 124
- Atwood Heights School District 125
- Alsip-Hazelgreen-Oak Lawn School District 126
- Worth School District 127
- Chicago Ridge School District 127½
- Palos Heights School District 128
- Cook County School District 130 — based in Blue Island
- Calumet Public School District 132
- General George Patton School District 133
- Orland School District 135
- Kirby School District 140
- Forest Ridge School District 142
- Midlothian School District 143
- Posen-Robbins School District 143½
- Prairie-Hills Elementary School District 144
- Arbor Park School District 145
- Tinley Park Community Consolidated School District 146
- West Harvey-Dixmoor Public School District 147
- Dolton Riverdale School District 148
- Dolton School District 149
- South Holland School District 150
- South Holland School District 151
- Harvey School District 152
- Hazel Crest School District 152½
- Homewood School District 153
- Thornton School District 154
- Burnham School District 154½
- Calumet City School District 155
- Lincoln Elementary School District 156
- Hoover-Schrum Memorial School District 157
- Lansing School District 158
- Elementary School District 159 — based in Matteson, but not District 162
- Country Club Hills School District 160
- Flossmoor School District 161
- Matteson School District 162 — not to be confused with District 159, also based in Matteson
- Park Forest School District 163
- Brookwood School District 167
- Community Consolidated School District 168 — based in Sauk Village
- Ford Heights School District 169
- Chicago Heights School District 170
- Sunnybrook School District 171
- Sandridge School District 172
- Steger School District 194
- Thornton Township High School District 205
- Bloom Township High School District 206
- Lemont Township High School District 210
- Thornton Fractional Township High School District 215
- Argo Community High School District 217
- Community High School District 218 — based in Oak Lawn
- Reavis Township High School District 220
- Rich Township High School District 227
- Bremen Community High School District 228
- Oak Lawn Community High School District 229
- Consolidated High School District 230 — based in Orland Park
- Evergreen Park Community High School District 231
- Homewood Flossmoor Community High School District 233

== Region 08: Carroll/Jo Daviess/Stephenson ROE ==
=== Carroll County ===
- Eastland Community Unit School District 308
- West Carroll Community Unit School District 314
- Chadwick-Milledgeville Community Unit School District 399

=== Jo Daviess County ===
- East Dubuque Unit School District 119
- Galena Unit School District 120
- Warren Community Unit School District 205
- Stockton Community Unit School District 206
- River Ridge Community Unit School District 210
- Scales Mound Community Unit School District 211

=== Stephenson County ===
- Freeport School District 145
- Pearl City Community Unit School District 200
- Dakota Community Unit School District 201
- Lena-Winslow Community Unit School District 202
- Orangeville Community Unit School District 203

== Region 09: Champaign/Ford ROE ==
=== Champaign County ===
- Fisher Community Unit School District 1
- Mahomet-Seymour Community Unit School District 3
- Champaign Unit 4 School District
- Tolono Community Unit School District 7
- Heritage Community Unit School District 8
- Urbana School District 116
- Thomasboro Community Consolidated School District 130
- Rantoul City School District 137
- Ludlow Community Consolidated School District 142
- St. Joseph Community Consolidated School District 169
- Gifford Community Consolidated School District 188
- Rantoul Township High School District 193
- Prairieview-Ogden Community Consolidated School District 197
- Saint Joseph Ogden Community High School District 305

=== Ford County ===
- Gibson City-Melvin-Sibley Community Unit School District 5
- Paxton-Buckley-Loda Community Unit School District 10

== Region 11: Clark/Coles/Cumberland/Douglas/Edgar/Moultrie/Shelby ROE ==
=== Clark County ===
- Marshall Community Unit School District C-2
- Martinsville Community Unit School District C-3
- Casey-Westfield Community Unit School District C-4

=== Coles County ===
- Charleston Community Unit School District 1
- Mattoon Community Unit School District 2
- Oakland Community Unit School District 5

=== Cumberland County ===
- Neoga Community Unit School District 3
- Cumberland Community Unit School District 77

=== Douglas County ===
- Tuscola Community Unit School District 301
- Villa Grove Community Unit School District 302
- Arthur Community Unit School District 305
- Arcola Community Unit School District 306

=== Edgar County ===
- Shiloh Community Unit School District 1
- Kansas Community Unit School District 3
- Paris Community Unit School District No. 4 — grades 9-12 served by Paris Cooperative High School since 2009
- Edgar County Community Unit District 6
- Paris Union School District 95 — grades 9-12 served by Paris Cooperative High School since 2009

=== Moultrie County ===
- Sullivan Community Unit School District 300
- Okaw Valley Community Unit School District 302

=== Shelby County ===
- Windsor Community Unit School District 1
- Cowden-Herrick Community Unit School District 3A
- Shelbyville Community Unit School District 4
- Stewardson-Strasburg Community Unit District 5A
- Central A&M Community Unit District 21

== Region 12: Clay/Crawford/Jasper/Lawrence/Richland ROE ==
=== Clay County ===
- Clay City Community Unit School District 10
- North Clay Community Unit School District 25
- Flora Community Unit School District 35

=== Crawford County ===
- Hutsonville Community Unit School District 1
- Robinson Community Unit School District 2
- Palestine Community Unit School District 3
- Oblong Community Unit School District 4

=== Jasper County ===
- Jasper County Community Unit School District 1

=== Lawrence County ===
- Red Hill Community Unit School District 10
- Lawrence County Community Unit School District 20

=== Richland County ===
- Richland County Community Unit School District 1 — formerly East Richland Community Unit School District 1

== Region 13: Clinton/Jefferson/Marion/Washington ROE ==
=== Clinton County ===
- Carlyle Community Unit School District 1
- Wesclin Community Unit School District 3
- Breese Elementary School District 12
- Saint Rose School District 14-15
- Aviston School District 21
- Willow Grove School District 46
- Bartelso School District 57
- Germantown School District 60
- Damiansville School District 62
- Albers School District 63
- Central Community High School District 71
- North Wamac School District 186

=== Jefferson County ===
- Waltonville Community Unit School District 1
- Rome Community Consolidated School District 2
- Field Community Consolidated School District 3
- Opdyke-Belle Rive Community Consolidated School District 5
- Grand Prairie Community Consolidated School District 6
- McClellan Community Consolidated School District 12
- Summersville School District 79
- Mount Vernon School District 80
- Bethel School District 82
- Farrington Community Consolidated School District 99
- Spring Garden School District 178
- Mount Vernon Township High School District 201
- Woodlawn Unit School District 209
- Bluford Unit School District 318

=== Marion County ===
- Raccoon Consolidated School District 1
- Kell Consolidated School District 2
- Iuka Community Consolidated School District 7
- Selmaville Community Consolidated School District 10
- Patoka Community Unit School District 100
- Salem School District 111
- Central City School District 133
- Centralia School District 135
- Centralia High School District 200
- South Central Community Unit District 401
- Sandoval Community Unit School District 501
- Salem Community High School District 600
- Odin Public School District 722

=== Washington County ===
- Oakdale Community Consolidated School District 1
- West Washington County Community Unit District 10
- Irvington Community Consolidated School District 11
- Ashley Community Consolidated School District 15
- Nashville Community Consolidated School District 49
- Nashville Community High School District 99

== Region 15: City of Chicago ==
=== Cook County ===
- City of Chicago School District 299

== Region 16: DeKalb ROE ==
=== DeKalb County ===
- Genoa Kingston Community Unit School District 424
- Indian Creek Community Unit District 425 — formerly Shabbona Community Unit School District 425
- Hiawatha Community Unit School District 426
- Sycamore Community Unit School District 427
- DeKalb Community Unit School District 428
- Hinckley Big Rock Community Unit School District 429
- Sandwich Community Unit School District 430
- Somonauk Community Unit School District 432

== Region 17: DeWitt/Livingston/Logan/McLean ROE ==
=== DeWitt County ===
- Clinton Community Unit School District 15
- Blue Ridge Community Unit School District 18

=== Livingston County ===
- Woodland Community Unit School District 5
- Tri-Point Community Unit School District 6-J
- Prairie Central Community Unit School District 8 — including Prairie Central High School
- Flanagan-Cornell Unit 74
- Pontiac Township High School District 90
- Dwight Township High School District 230
- Dwight Common School District 232
- Rooks Creek Community Consolidated School District 425
- Cornell Community Consolidated School District 426
- Pontiac Community Consolidated School District 429
- Odell Community Consolidated School District 435
- Saunemin Community Consolidated School District 438

=== Logan County ===
- Hartsburg Emden Community Unit School District 21
- Mt. Pulaski Community Unit School District 23
- Lincoln Elementary School District 27
- Chester-East Lincoln Community Consolidated School District 61
- New Holland-Middletown Elementary School District 88
- West Lincoln-Broadwell Elementary School District 92
- Lincoln Community High School District 404

=== McLean County ===
- Le Roy Community Unit School District 2
- Tri-Valley Community Unit School District 3
- Heyworth Community Unit School District 4
- McLean County Unit District No. 5
- Lexington Community Unit School District 7
- Olympia Community Unit School District 16
- Ridgeview Community Unit School District 19
- Bloomington School District 87

== Region 19: DuPage ROE ==
=== DuPage County ===
- Bensenville School District 2
- Addison School District 4
- Wood Dale School District 7
- Itasca School District 10
- Medinah School District 11
- Roselle School District 12
- Bloomingdale School District 13
- Marquardt School District 15 — based in Glendale Heights
- Queen Bee School District 16 — based in Glendale Heights
- Keeneyville School District 20
- Benjamin School District 25
- West Chicago Elementary School District 33
- Winfield School District 34
- Glen Ellyn School District 41
- Lombard School District 44
- School District 45, DuPage County — based in Villa Park
- Salt Creek School District 48 — based in Villa Park
- Butler School District 53
- Downers Grove Grade School District 58
- Maercker School District 60
- Darien School District 61
- Gower School District 62
- Cass School District 63
- Center Cass School District 66
- Woodridge School District 68
- Hinsdale Township High School District 86
- Glenbard Township High School District 87
- DuPage High School District 88
- Community Consolidated School District 89 — based in Glen Ellyn
- Community Consolidated School District 93 — based in Bloomingdale
- Community High School District 94 — based in West Chicago
- Community High School District 99 — based in Downers Grove
- Fenton Community High School District 100
- Lake Park Community High School District 108
- Community Consolidated School District 180 — based in Burr Ridge
- Hinsdale Community Consolidated School District 181
- Community Unit School District 200 — based in Wheaton
- Westmont Community Unit School District 201
- Lisle Community Unit School District 202
- Naperville Community Unit School District 203
- Indian Prairie School District 204 — based in Aurora
- Elmhurst Community Unit School District 205

== Region 20: Edwards/Gallatin/Hamilton/Hardin/Pope/Saline/Wabash/Wayne/White ROE ==
=== Edwards County ===
- Edwards County Community Unit School District 1

=== Gallatin County ===
- Gallatin Community Unit School District 7

=== Hamilton County ===
- Hamilton County Community Unit School District 10

=== Hardin County ===
- Hardin County Community Unit School District 1

=== Pope County ===
- Pope County Community Unit School District 1

=== Saline County ===
- Galatia Community Unit School District 1
- Carrier Mills-Stonefort Community Unit School District 2
- Harrisburg Community Unit School District 3
- Eldorado Community Unit School District 4

=== Wabash County ===
- Allendale Community Consolidated School District 17
- Wabash Community Unit School District 348

=== Wayne County ===
- New Hope Community Consolidated School District 6
- Geff Community Consolidated School District 14
- Jasper Community Consolidated School District 17
- Wayne City Community Unit School District 100
- Fairfield Public School District 112
- North Wayne Community Unit School District 200
- Fairfield Community High School District 225

=== White County ===
- Grayville Community Unit School District 1
- Norris City-Omaha-Enfield Community Unit School District 3
- Carmi-White County Community Unit School District 5

== Region 21: Franklin/Johnson/Massac/Williamson ROE ==
=== Franklin County ===
- Benton Community Consolidated School District 47
- Akin Community Consolidated School District 91
- Christopher Unit School District 99
- Benton Consolidated High School District 103
- Ewing Northern Community Consolidated District 115
- Frankfort Community Unit School District 168
- Thompsonville Community Unit School District 174
- Zeigler-Royalton Community Unit School District 188
- Sesser-Valier Community Unit School District 196

=== Johnson County ===
- Goreville Community Unit District 1
- New Simpson Hill School District 32
- Buncombe Consolidated School District 43
- Vienna School District 55
- Cypress School District 64
- Vienna High School District 133

=== Massac County ===
- Massac Unit District 1
- Joppa-Maple Grove Unit District 38

=== Williamson County ===
- Johnston City Community Unit School District 1
- Marion Community Unit School District 2
- Crab Orchard Community Unit School District 3
- Herrin Community Unit School District 4
- Carterville Community Unit School District 5

== Region 24: Grundy/Kendall ROE ==
=== Grundy County ===
- Coal City Community Unit School District 1
- Mazon-Verona-Kinsman Elementary School District 2C
- Nettle Creek Community Consolidated School District 24C
- Morris School District 54
- Saratoga Community Consolidated School District 60C
- Gardner Community Consolidated School District 72C
- Gardner-South Wilmington Township High School District 73
- South Wilmington Community Consolidated School District 74
- Braceville School District 75
- Morris Community High School District 101
- Minooka Community High School District 111
- Minooka Community Consolidated School District 201

=== Kendall County ===
- Newark Community High School District 18
- Newark Community Consolidated School District 66
- Plano Community Unit School District 88
- Lisbon Community Consolidated School District 90
- Yorkville Community Unit School District 115
- Oswego Community Unit School District 308

== Region 26: Hancock/Fulton/Schuyler/McDonough ROE ==
=== Fulton County ===
- Astoria Community Unit School District 1
- Vermont Ipava Table Grove Community Unit School District 2 — known as V.I.T.
- Community Unit School District 3, Fulton County — Cuba schools, also known as North Fulton
- Spoon River Valley Community Unit School District 4
- Canton Union School District 66
- Lewistown Community Unit School District 97

=== Hancock County ===
- Illini West High School District 307
- Warsaw Community Unit School District 316 — deactivated into tuition for grades 7-8 to Nauvoo-Colusa Community Unit School District 325 in 2008
- Carthage Elementary School District 317
- Nauvoo–Colusa Community Unit School District 325 — deactivated into tuition for graded 9-12 to Warsaw Community Unit School District 316 in 2008
- Dallas Elementary School District 327
- Hamilton Community Consolidated School District 328
- Southeastern Community Unit School District 337
- La Harpe Community School District 347

=== McDonough County ===
- West Prairie Community Unit School District 103
- Bushnell Prairie City Community Unit School District 170
- Macomb Community Unit School District 185

=== Schuyler County ===
- Schuyler-Industry Community Unit School District 5

== Region 28: Bureau/Henry/Stark ROE ==
=== Bureau County ===
- Ohio Community Consolidated School District 17
- Malden Community Consolidated School District 84
- Ladd Community Consolidated School District 94
- Dalzell School District 98
- Spring Valley Community Consolidated School District 99
- DePue Unit School District 103
- Princeton Elementary School District 115
- La Moille Community Unit School District 303
- Bureau Valley Community Unit School District 340
- Princeton High School District 500
- Hall High School District 502
- Ohio Community High School District 505

=== Henry County ===
- Colona School District 190
- Orion Community Unit School District 223
- Galva Community Unit School District 224
- AlWood Community Unit School District 225 (Alpha-Woodhull)
- Annawan Community Unit School District 226
- Cambridge Community Unit School District 227
- Geneseo Community Unit School District 228
- Kewanee Community Unit School District 229
- Wethersfield Community Unit School District 230

=== Stark County ===
- Bradford Community Unit School District 1 — deactivated into tuition for grades 9-12 to Henry-Senachwine Community School District 5, Stark County Community Unit School District 100 and Bureau Valley Community Unit School District 340 in 2001
- Stark County Community Unit School District 100

== Region 30: Alexander/Jackson/Pulaski/Perry/Union ROE ==
=== Alexander County ===
- Cairo Unified School District 1
- Egyptian Community Unit School District 5

=== Jackson County ===
- Desoto Consolidated School District 86
- Carbondale Elementary School District 95
- Giant City Community Consolidated School District 130
- Unity Point Community Consolidated School District 140
- Carbondale Community High School District 165
- Trico Community Unit School District 176
- Murphysboro Community Unit School District 186
- Elverado Community Unit School District 196

=== Perry County ===
- Tamaroa School District 5
- Pinckneyville School District 50
- Pinckneyville Community High School District 101
- Community Consolidated School District 204 (Pinckneyville)
- Du Quoin Community Unit School District 300

=== Pulaski County ===
- Century Community Unit School District 100
- Meridian Community Unit School District 101

=== Union County ===
- Lick Creek Community Consolidated School District 16
- Cobden Unit School District 17
- Anna Community Consolidated School District 37
- Jonesboro Community Consolidated School District 43, also sometimes listed as "Jonesboro Elementary School District" or "County of Union School District No. 43"
- Dongola Unit School District 66
- Anna Jonesboro Community High School District 81
- Shawnee Community Unit School District 84

== Region 31: Kane ROE ==
=== Kane County ===
- Elgin Area School District U46 (a Unit school district) — also serves areas in Cook and DuPage counties
- Batavia Unit School District 101
- West Aurora Public School District 129
- East Aurora Public School District 131
- Community Unit School District 300 — also serves areas in McHenry County
- Central Community Unit School District 301
- Kaneland Community Unit School District 302 — also serves areas in DeKalb County
- St. Charles Community Unit School District 303 — also serves areas in DuPage County
- Geneva Community Unit School District 304

== Region 32: Iroquois/Kankakee ROE ==
=== Iroquois County ===
- Donovan Community Unit School District 3
- Central Community Unit School District 4
- Cissna Park Community Unit School District 6
- Iroquois County Community Unit School District 9
- Iroquois West Community Unit School District 10
- Milford Area Public Schools District 124
- Crescent Iroquois Community Unit School District 249 — deactivated into tuition for grades 9-12 to Cissna Park Community Unit School District 6, Iroquois County Community Unit School District 9 and Iroquois West Community Unit School District 10 in 2009 and for grades 6-8 to Cissna Park Community Unit School District 6, Iroquois County Community Unit School District 9 and Iroquois West Community Unit School District 10 in 2023

=== Kankakee County ===
- Momence Community Unit School District 1
- Herscher Community Unit School District 2
- Manteno Community Unit School District 5 — small portion extends into Wesley Township, Will County
- Grant Park Community Unit School District 6
- St. Anne Unit District 24
- Bourbonnais School District 53
- Bradley Elementary School District 61
- Kankakee School District 111
- St. George Community Consolidated School District 258
- Pembroke Community Consolidated School District 259
- Bradley-Bourbonnais Community High School District 307

== Region 33: Henderson/Knox/Mercer/Warren ROE ==
=== Henderson County ===
- West Central Community Unit School District 235

=== Knox County ===
- Knoxville Community Unit School District 202
- Galesburg Community Unit School District 205
- R.O.W.V.A. Community Unit School District 208 (Rio, Oneida, Wataga, Victoria and Altona)
- Williamsfield Community Unit School District 210
- Abingdon-Avon Community Unit School District 276 — also covers parts of Fulton County

=== Mercer County ===
- Mercer County School District 404

=== Warren County ===
- Monmouth-Roseville Community Unit School District 238
- United Community Unit School District 304

== Region 34: Lake ROE ==
=== Lake County ===
- Winthrop Harbor School District 1
- Beach Park Community Consolidated School District 3
- Zion Elementary School District 6
- Millburn Community Consolidated School District 24
- Emmons School District 33
- Antioch Community Consolidated School District 34
- Grass Lake School District 36
- Gavin School District 37
- Big Hollow School District 38
- Lake Villa Community Consolidated School District 41
- Community Consolidated School District 46 — based in Grayslake
- Woodland Community Consolidated School District 50
- Gurnee School District 56
- Waukegan Community Unit School District 60
- Lake Bluff Elementary School District 65
- Lake Forest School District 67
- Oak Grove School District 68
- Libertyville District 70
- Rondout School District 72
- Hawthorn Community Consolidated School District 73
- Mundelein Elementary School District 75
- Diamond Lake School District 76
- Fremont School District 79
- Community Unit School District 95 — Lake Zurich
- Kildeer Countryside Community Consolidated School District 96
- Aptakisic-Tripp Community Consolidated School District 102
- Lincolnshire-Prairie View School District 103
- Bannockburn Elementary School District 106
- Deerfield School District 109
- North Shore School District 112
- Township High School District 113 — headquartered in Highland Park
- Fox Lake Grade School District 114
- Lake Forest Community High School District 115
- Round Lake Area Schools District 116
- Community High School District 117 — Antioch Community High School and Lakes Community High School
- Wauconda Community Unit School District 118
- Mundelein Consolidated High School District 120
- Warren Township High School District 121
- Grant Community High School District 124
- Adlai E. Stevenson High School District 125
- Zion-Benton Township High School District 126
- Grayslake Community High School District 127
- Community High School District 128 — Libertyville High School and Vernon Hills High School
- North Chicago School District 187
- Barrington Community Unit School District 220 — also covers areas in Cook County

== Region 35: LaSalle/Marshall/Putnam ROE ==
=== LaSalle County ===
- Leland Community Unit School District 1
- Serena Community Unit School District 2
- Earlville Community Unit School District 9
- Streator Township High School District 40
- Streator Elementary School District 44
- Allen-Otter Creek Community Consolidated School District 65
- Tonica Community Consolidated School District 79
- Deer Park Community Consolidated School District 82
- Grand Ridge Community Consolidated School District 95
- LaSalle-Peru Township High School District 120
- LaSalle Elementary School District 122
- Peru Elementary School District 124
- Oglesby Elementary School District 125
- Ottawa Township High School District 140
- Ottawa Elementary School District 141
- Marseilles Elementary School District 150
- Seneca Township High School District 160
- Seneca Community Consolidated School District 170
- Dimmick Community Consolidated School District 175 — from 2017 also includes the territory of dissolved Cherry School District 92
- Waltham Community Consolidated School District 185
- Wallace Community Consolidated School District 195
- Miller Township Community Consolidated School District 210
- Rutland Community Consolidated School District 230
- Mendota Township High School District 280
- Mendota Consolidated Community School District 289
- Lostant Community Unit School District 425 — deactivated into tuition for grades 9-12 to Fieldcrest Community Unit School District 6, Streator Township High School District 40, LaSalle-Pery Township High School District 120 and Putnam County Community Unit School District 535 in 1993

=== Marshall County ===
- Henry-Senachwine Community Unit School District 5
- Midland Community Unit School District 7

=== Putnam County ===
- Putnam County Community Unit School District 535

== Region 39: Macon/Piatt ROE ==
=== Macon County ===
- Argenta-Oreana Community Unit School District 1
- Maroa Forsyth Community Unit School District 2
- Mt. Zion Community Unit School District 3
- Sangamon Valley Community Unit School District 9
- Warrensburg-Latham Community Unit District 11
- Meridian Community Unit School District 15
- Decatur School District 61

=== Piatt County ===
- Bement Community Unit School District 5
- Monticello Community Unit School District 25
- DeLand-Weldon Community Unit School District 57
- Cerro Gordo Community Unit School District 100

== Region 40: Calhoun/Green/Jersey/Macoupin ROE ==
=== Calhoun County ===
- Calhoun Community Unit School District 40
- Brussels Community Unit School District 42

=== Greene County ===
- Carrollton Community Unit School District 1
- North Greene Community Unit School District 3
- Greenfield Community Unit School District 10

=== Jersey County ===
- Jersey Community Unit School District 100

=== Macoupin County ===
- Carlinville Community Unit School District 1
- Northwestern Community Unit School District 2
- Mount Olive Community Unit School District 5
- Staunton Community Unit School District 6
- Gillespie Community Unit School District 7
- Bunker Hill Community Unit School District 8
- Southwestern Community Unit School District 9
- North Mac Community Unit School District 34

== Region 41: Madison ROE ==
=== Madison County ===
- Roxana Community Unit School District 1
- Triad Community Unit School District 2
- Venice Community Unit School District 3 — deactivated into tuition for grades 9-12 to East Saint Louis School District 189 in 2004
- Highland Community Unit School District 5
- Edwardsville Community Unit School District 7
- Bethalto Community Unit School District 8
- Granite City Community Unit School District 9
- Collinsville Community Unit School District 10
- Alton Community Unit School District 11
- Madison Community Unit School District 12
- East Alton School District 13
- East Alton-Wood River Community High School District 14
- Wood River-Hartford Elementary School District 15

== Region 44: McHenry ROE ==
=== McHenry County ===
- Nippersink School District 2
- Fox River Grove Consolidated School District 3
- Johnsburg Community Unit School District 12
- McHenry School District 15
- Riley Community Consolidated School District 18
- Alden Hebron School District 19
- Cary Community Consolidated School District 26
- Harrison School District 36
- Prairie Grove Community School District 46
- Crystal Lake Community Consolidated School District 47
- Harvard Community Unit School District 50
- Marengo Community High School District 154
- Community High School District 155 — based in Crystal Lake
- McHenry Community High School District 156
- Richmond-Burton Community High School District 157
- Consolidated School District 158 — headquartered in Algonquin; serving students in McHenry and Kane counties
- Marengo-Union Elementary School District 165
- Woodstock Community Unit School District 200

== Region 45: Monroe/Randolph ROE ==
=== Monroe County ===
- Valmeyer Community Unit School District 3
- Columbia Community Unit School District 4
- Waterloo Community Unit School District 5

=== Randolph County ===
- Coulterville Unit School District 1
- Chester Non-High School District 122
- Red Bud Community Unit School District 132
- Prairie du Rocher Community Consolidated School District 134
- Steeleville Community Unit School District 138
- Chester Community Unit School District 139
- Sparta Community Unit School District 140

== Region 47: Lee/Ogle/Whiteside ROE ==
=== Lee County ===
- Dixon Unit School District 170 (also known as Dixon Public Schools)
- Steward Elementary School District 220
- Paw Paw Community Unit School District 271 — deactivated into tuition for grades 9-12 to Indian Creek Community Unit School District 425 in 2019
- Amboy Community Unit School District 272
- Ashton-Franklin Center Community Unit School District 275

=== Ogle County ===
- Kings Consolidated School District 144
- Creston Community Consolidated School District 161
- Rochelle Township High School District 212 — also covers part of Lee and DeKalb counties
- Oregon Community Unit School District 220
- Forrestville Valley Community Unit School District 221
- Polo Community Unit School District 222
- Meridian Community Unit School District 223
- Byron Community Unit School District 226
- Rochelle Community Consolidated School District 231
- Eswood Community Consolidated District 269 — also covers part of DeKalb County

=== Whiteside County ===
- Erie Community Unit School District 1
- River Bend Community Unit School District 2
- Prophetstown-Lyndon-Tampico Community Unit School District 3
- Sterling Community Unit School District 5
- Morrison Community Unit School District 6
- Rock Falls Elementary School District 13
- East Coloma-Nelson Consolidated Elementary School District 20
- Montmorency Community Consolidated School District 145
- Rock Falls Township High School District 301

== Region 48: Peoria ROE ==
=== Peoria County ===
- Pleasant Valley School District 62
- Norwood Elementary School District 63
- Bartonville School District 66
- Oak Grove School District 68
- Pleasant Hill School District 69
- Monroe School District 70
- Peoria School District 150
- Farmington Central Community Unit School District 265
- Brimfield Community Unit School District 309
- Limestone Community High School District 310
- Limestone Walters Community Consolidated School District 316
- Illinois Valley Central Unit District 321
- Elmwood Community Unit School District 322
- Dunlap Community Unit School District 323
- Peoria Heights Community Unit School District 325
- Princeville Community Unit School District 326
- Illini Bluffs Community Unit School District 327
- Hollis Consolidated School District 328

== Region 49: Rock Island ROE ==
=== Rock Island County ===
- Hampton School District 29
- United Township High School District 30
- Silvis School District 34
- Carbon Cliff-Barstow School District 36
- East Moline School District 37
- Moline-Coal Valley Community Unit School District 40
- Rock Island–Milan School District 41
- Riverdale Community Unit School District 100
- Sherrard Community Unit School District 200
- Rockridge Community Unit School District 300

== Region 50: St. Clair ROE ==
=== St. Clair County ===
- Lebanon Community Unit School District 9
- Mascoutah Community Unit District 19
- St. Libory Consolidated School District 30
- Marissa Community Unit School District 40
- New Athens Community Unit School District 60
- Freeburg Community Consolidated School District 70
- Freeburg Community High School District 77
- Shiloh Village School District 85
- O'Fallon Community Consolidated School District 90
- Central School District 104
- Pontiac William Holliday School District 105
- Grant Community Consolidated School District 110
- Wolf Branch School District 113
- Whiteside School District 115
- High Mount School District 116
- Belleville School District 118
- Belle Valley School District 119
- Smithton Community Consolidated School District 130
- Millstadt Community Consolidated School District 160
- Harmony Emge School District 175
- Signal Hill School District 181
- Cahokia Community Unit School District 187
- Brooklyn Unit School District 188
- East St. Louis School District 189
- Dupo Community Unit School District 196
- Belleville Township High School District 201
- O'Fallon Township High School District 203

== Region 51: Menard/Sangamon ROE ==
=== Menard County ===
- Greenview Community Unit School District 200
- Porta Community Unit School District 202
- Athens Community Unit School District 213

=== Sangamon County ===
- Tri-City Community Unit School District 1
- Rochester Community Unit School District 3A
- Ball Chatham Community Unit School District 5
- Pleasant Plains Community Unit School District 8
- Auburn Community Unit School District 10
- Pawnee Community Unit School District 11
- Riverton Community Unit School District 14
- Williamsville Community Unit School District 15
- New Berlin Community Unit School District 16
- Springfield School District 186

== Region 53: Mason/Tazewell/Woodford ROE ==
=== Mason County ===
- Havana Community Unit School District 126
- Illini Central Community Unit School District 189
- Midwest Central Community Unit School District 191

=== Tazewell County ===
- District 50 Schools
- Central School District 51
- Washington School District 52
- Creve Coeur School District 76
- Robein School District 85
- East Peoria School District 86
- Rankin Community School District 98
- North Pekin & Marquette Heights School District 102
- Pekin Public School District 108
- South Pekin School District 137
- Pekin Community High School District 303
- Washington Community High School District 308
- East Peoria Community High School District 309
- Spring Lake Community Consolidated School District 606
- Deer Creek-Mackinaw Community Unit School District 701
- Tremont Community Unit School District 702
- Delavan Community Unit School District 703
- Morton Community Unit School District 709

=== Woodford County ===
- Metamora Community Consolidated School District 1
- Riverview Community Consolidated School District 2
- Fieldcrest Community Unit School District 6
- El Paso-Gridley Community Unit School District 11
- Lowpoint-Washburn Community Unit School District 21
- Roanoke Benson Community Unit School District 60
- Germantown Hills School District 69
- Metamora Township High School District 122
- Eureka Community Unit District 140

== Region 54: Vermilion ROE ==
=== Vermilion County ===
- Bismarck-Henning Community Unit School District 1 — grades 9-12 served by Bismarck-Henning-Rossville-Alvin Cooperative High School since 2017
- Westville Community Unit School District 2
- Georgetown-Ridge Farm Community Unit District 4
- Rossville-Alvin Community Unit School District 7 — deactivated into tuition for grades 9-12 to Bismarck-Henning Community School District 1 and Hoopeston Area Community Unit School District 11 (until 2017) in 2005; grades 9-12 served by Bismarck-Henning-Rossville-Alvin Cooperative High School since 2017
- Potomac Community Unit School District 10 — deactivated into tuition for grades 9-12 to Armstrong Township High School District 225 in 1994
- Hoopeston Area Community Unit School District 11
- Armstrong-Ellis Consolidated School District 61
- Oakwood Community Unit School District 76
- Danville Community Consolidated School District 118
- Armstrong Township High School District 225
- Salt Fork Community Unit School District 512

== Region 56: Will ROE ==
=== Will County ===
- Channahon School District 17
- Troy Community Consolidated School District 30C
- Homer Community Consolidated School District 33C
- Laraway Community Consolidated School District 70C
- Union School District 81
- Rockdale School District 84
- Joliet Public School District 86
- Chaney-Monge School District 88
- Richland School District 88A
- Fairmont School District 89
- Taft School District 90
- Milne-Kelvin Grove District 91 — also known as Lockport School District 91
- Will County School District 92
- Manhattan School District 114
- New Lenox School District 122
- Frankfort Community Consolidated School District 157C
- Mokena School District 159
- Summit Hill School District 161
- Beecher Community Unit School District 200U
- Crete Monee Community Unit School District 201U
- Plainfield Community Consolidated School District 202
- Elwood Community Consolidated School District 203
- Joliet Township High School District 204
- Lockport Township High School District 205
- Peotone Community Unit School District 207U
- Wilmington School District 209-U
- Lincoln-Way Community High School District 210
- Reed Custer Community Unit School District 255U
- Valley View Community Unit School District 365U

== Region 60: Illinois Department of Corrections ==
- Illinois Department of Juvenile Justice: School District 428

== Defunct Regions ==
- Region 02: Alexander/Johnson/Massac/Pulaski/Union ROE — became part of Region 21: Franklin/Williamson ROE for Johnson and Massac counties and Region 30: Jackson/Perry ROE for Alexander, Pulaski and Union counties in 2015, which were renamed Region 21: Franklin/Johnson/Massac/Williamson ROE and Region 30: Alexander/Jackson/Perry/Pulaski/Union ROE, respectively
- Region 10: Christian/Montgomery ROE — became part of Region 03: Bond/Effingham/Fayette ROE in 2015, which was renamed Region 03: Bond/Christian/Effingham/Fayette/Montgomery ROE
- Region 14: Suburban Cook ROE — split into Region 05: North Cook ISC 1, Region 06: West Cook ISC 2 and Region 07: South Cook ISC 4 in 2010
- Region 22: Fulton/Schuyler ROE — became part of Region 26: Hancock/McDonough ROE in 2015, which was renamed Region 26: Fulton/Hancock/McDonough/Schulery ROE
- Region 25: Hamilton/Jefferson ROE — became part of Region 13: Clinton/Marion/Washington ROE for Jefferson County and Region 20: Edwards/Gallatin/Hardin/Pope/Saline/Wabash/Wayne/White ROE for Hamilton County in 2015, which were renamed Region 13: Clinton/Jefferson/Marion/Washington ROE and Region 20: Edwards/Gallatin/Hamilton/Hardin/Pope/Saline/Wabash/Wayne/White ROE, respectively
- Region 27: Henderson/Mercer/Warren ROE — became part of Region 33: Knox ROE in 2015, which was renamed Region 33: Henderson/Knox/Mercer/Warren ROE
- Region 38: Logan/Mason/Menard ROE — became part of Region 17: Dewitt/Livingston/McLean ROE for Logan County, Region 51: Sangamon ROE for Menard County and Region 53: Tazewell ROE for Mason County in 2015, which were renamed Region 17: Dewitt/Livingston/Logan/McLean ROE, Region 51: Menard/Sangamon ROE and Region 53: Mason/Tazewell ROE, respectively
- Region 43: Marshall/Putnam/Woodford ROE — became part of Region 35: LaSalle ROE for Marshall and Putnam Counties and Region 53: Tazewell ROE for Woodford County in 2015, which were renamed Region 35: LaSalle/Marshall/Putnam ROE and Region 53: Tazewell/Woodford ROE, respectively
- Region 46: Brown/Cass/Morgan/Scott ROE — became part of Region 01: Adams/Pike ROE in 2015, which was renamed Region 01: Adams/PikeBrown/Cass/Morgan/Scott ROE
- Region 55: Whiteside ROE — became part of Region 47: Lee/Ogle ROE in 2015, which was renamed Region 47: Lee/Ogle/Whiteside ROE

== Defunct School Districts ==
=== Adams County ===
- Chandlerville Community Unit School District 62 — consolidated with Ashland Community Unit School District 212 to form A-C Central Community Unit School District 262 in 1989
- Ashland Community Unit School District 212 — consolidated with Chandlerville Community Unit School District 62 to form A-C Central Community Unit School District 262 in 1989

=== Bureau County ===
- Kasbeer Community School District 23 — annexed into Princeton Elementary School District 115 in 1994
- Cherry School District 92 — deactivated into tuition to Dimmick Community Consolidated School District 175 in 2014 and consolidated with that district to form a "new" Dimmick Community Consolidated School District 175 in 2017
- Wyanet Elementary School District 126 — consolidated with Walnut Elementary School District 285, Manlius Unit School School District 305, Western Unit School District 306, Walnut High School District 508 and Wyanet High School District 510 to form Bureau Valley Community Unit School District 340 in 1995
- Leepertown Community Consolidated School District 175 — annexed (dissolved) into Ladd Community Consolidated School District 94 and Princeton Elementary School District 115 in 2012
- Walnut Elementary School District 285 — consolidated with Wyanet Elementary School District 126, Manlius Unit School School District 305, Western Unit School District 306, Walnut High School District 508 and Wyanet High School District 510 to from Bureau Valley Community Unit School District 340 in 1995
- Tiskilwa Community Unit School District 300 — annexed into Princeton Elementary School District 115 and Princeton Township High School District 500 in 1996
- Manlius Unit School School District 305 — consolidated with Wyanet Elementary School District 126, Walnut Elementary School District 285, Western Unit School District 306, Walnut High School District 508 and Wyanet High School District 510 to from Bureau Valley Community Unit School District 340 in 1995
- Western Unit School District 306 — consolidated with Wyanet Elementary School District 126, Walnut Elementary School District 285, Manlius Unit School School District 305, Walnut High School District 508 and Wyanet High School District 510 to from Bureau Valley Community Unit School District 340 in 1995
- Neponset Community Consolidated District 307 — deactivated into tuition for grades 9-12 to Bradford Community Unit School District 1 (until 2001), Bureau Valley Community Unit School District 340, Annawan Community Unit School District 226, Kewanee Community Unit School District 229 and Wethersfield Community Unit School District 230 in 1999 and annexed into Kewanee Community Unit School District 229 in 2011
- Walnut High School District 508 — consolidated with Wyanet Elementary School District 126, Walnut Elementary School District 285, Manlius Unit School School District 305, Western Unit School District 306 and Wyanet High School District 510 to from Bureau Valley Community Unit School District 340 in 1995
- Wyanet High School District 510 — consolidated with Wyanet Elementary School District 126, Walnut Elementary School District 285, Manlius Unit School School District 305, Western Unit School District 306 and Walnut High School District 508 to from Bureau Valley Community Unit School District 340 in 1995
- Malden High School District 511 — annexed into Princeton Township High School District 500 in 1983

=== Calhoun County ===
- Brussels Community High School District 37 — consolidated with Brussels-Richwood Community Consolidated School District 41 to form Brussels Community Unit School District 42 in 1988
- Brussels-Richwood Community Consolidated School District 41 — colsolidated with Brussels Community High School District 37 to form Brussels Community Unit School District 42 in 1988

=== Carroll County ===
- Savanna Community Unit School District 300 — consolidated with Thomson Community Unit School District 301 and Mount Carroll Community Unit School District 304 to form West Carroll Community Unit School District 314 in 2005
- Thomson Community Unit School District 301 — consolidated with Savanna Community Unit School District 300 and Mount Carroll Community Unit School District 304 to form West Carroll Community Unit School District 314 in 2005
- Shannon Community Unit School District 303 — consolidated with Lanark Community Unit School District 305 to form Eastland Community Unit School District 308 in 1986
- Mount Carroll Community Unit School District 304 — consolidated with Savanna Community Unit School District 300 and Thomson Community Unit School District 301 to form West Carroll Community Unit School District 314 in 2005
- Lanark Community Unit School District 305 — consolidated with Shannon Community Unit School District 303 to form Eastland Community Unit School District 308 in 1986
- Milledgeville Community Unit School District 312 — annexed into Chadwick Community Unit School District 399 in 1989, which was renamed Chadwick-Milledgeville Community Unit School District 399

=== Champaign County ===
- A.B.L. Community Unit School District 6 (Allerton-Broadlands-Longview) — consolidated with Homer Community Consolidated School District 208 to form Heritage Community Unit School District 8 in 1989
- Prairieview Community Consolidated School District 192 — consolidated with Ogden Community Consolidated School District 212 to form Prairieview-Ogden Community Consolidated School District 197 in 2006
- Homer Community Consolidated School District 208 — consolidated with A.B.L. Community Unit School District 6 to form Heritage Community Unit School District 8 in 1989
- Ogden Community Consolidated School District 212 — consolidated with Prairieview Community Consolidated School District 192 to form Prairieview-Ogden Community Consolidated School District 197 in 2006
- Penfield Community Consolidated School District 224 — annexed into Armstrong Ellis Community School District 61, Gifford Community Consolidated School District 188 and Prairieview Community Consolidated District 192 in 1991

=== Christian County ===
- Mount Auburn Community Unit School District 5 — deactivated into tuition for grades 9-12 to Taylorville Community Unit School District 3 in 1990 and annexed into that district in 1992
- Stonington Community Unit School District 7 — annexed into Taylorville Community Unit School District 3 in 1992
- Assumption Community Unit School District 9 — consolidated with Moweaqua Community School District 6A to from Central A&M Community Unit School District 21 in 1992
- Kincaid School District 182 — consolidated with Tovey School District 183 and South Fork School District 310 to form South Fork School District 14 in 1984
- Tovey School District 183 — consolidated with Kincaid School District 182 and South Fork School District 310 to form South Fork School District 14 in 1984
- South Fork School District 310 — consolidated with Kincaid School District 182 and Tovey School District 183 to from South Fork School District 14 in 1984

=== Clark County ===
- Casey Community Unit School District C-1 — consolidated with Westfield School District 105 and Westfield Township High School District 201 to form Casey-Westfield Community Unit School District C-4 in 1985
- Westfield School District 105 — consolidated with Casey Community Unit School District C-1 and Westfield Township High School District 201 to form Casey-Westfield Community Unit School District C-4 in 1985
- Westfield Township High School District 201 — consolidated with Casey Community Unit School District C-1 and Westfield School District 105 to form Casey-Westfield Community Unit School District C-4 in 1985

=== Cook County ===
- Lemont Community Consolidated School District 113 — consolidated with Bromberek School District 65 to form Lemont-Bromberek Combined School District 113A in 1990

=== DeKalb County ===
- Waterman Community Unit School District 431 — annexed into Indian Creek Community Unit School District 425 in 1993
- Malta Community Unit District 433 — annexed into DeKalb Community Unit School District 428 in 2000

=== DeWitt County ===
- Wapella Community Unit School District 5 — annexed into Clinton Community School District 15 in 1994
- Farmer City/Mansfield Community Unit School District 17 — consolidated with Bellflower Community Consolidated School District 88 and Bellflower Township High School District 311 to form Blue Ridge Community Unit School District 18 in 1985

=== Douglas County ===
- Newman Community Unit School District 303 — consolidated with Shiloh School District 2 to form Shiloh Community Unit School District 1 in 1994

=== DuPage County ===
- McAuley School District No. 27 (1857–1992) — annexed into West Chicago Elementary School District 33
- Bromberek School District 65 — consolidated with Lemont Community Consolidated School District 113 to form Lemont-Bromberek Combined School District 113A in 1990
- Puffer Hefty School District 69 — annexed (dissolved) into Downers Grove School District 58 in 2004

=== Edgar County ===
- Shiloh School District 2 — consolidated with Newman Community Unit School District 303 to form Shiloh Community Unit School District 1 in 1994

=== Fayette County ===
- LaGrove Community Unit School District 206 — consolidated with Kinmundy Alma Community Unit School District 301 to form South Central Community Unit School District 401 in 1989

=== Ford County ===
- Gibson City Community Unit School District 1 — consolidated with Melvin-Sibley Community Unit School District 4 to form Gibson City-Melvin-Sibley Community Unit School District 5 in 1993
- Paxton Community Unit School District 2 — consolidated with Buckley-Loda Community Unit School District 8 to form Paxton-Buckley-Loda Community Unit School District 10 in 1990
- Melvin-Sibley Community Unit School District 4 — consolidated with Gibson City Community Unit School District 1 to form Gibson City-Melvin-Sibley Community Unit School District 5 in 1993
- Ford Central Community Unit School District 8 — annexed into Tri-Point Community Unit School District 6J, Prairie Central Community Unit School District 8, Iroquois West Community Unit School District 10 and Paxton-Buckley-Loda Community Unit School District 10 in 1992

=== Franklin County ===
- Mulkeytown Community Consolidated School District 32 — annexed into Christopher School District 34 in 1987
- Christopher School District 34 — consolidated with Christopher Community High School District 38 to form Christopher Unit School District 99 in 1999
- Christopher Community High School District 38 — consolidated with Christopher School District 34 to form Christopher Unit School District 99 in 1999
- Thompsonville School District 62 — consolidated with Thompsonville Community High School District 112 to form Thompsonville Community Unit School District 174 in 2007
- Logan Community Consolidated School District 110 — annexed (dissolved) into Benton Community Consolidated School District 47 and Thompsonville School District 62 in 2005
- Thompsonville Community High School District 112 — consolidated with Thompsonville School District 62 to form Thompsonville Community Unit School District 174 in 2007

=== Fulton County ===
- Saint David School District 87 — consolidated with Lewistown School District 141, Prichard Clark Community Elementary School District 340 and Lewistown Community High School District 341 to form Lewistown Community Unit School District 97 in 1997
- Dunfermline School District 88 — annexed into Canton-Union School District 66 in 1994
- Lewistown School District 141 — consolidated with Saint David School District 87, Prichard Clark Community Elementary School District 340 and Lewistown Community High School District 341 to form Lewistown Community Unit School District 97 in 1997
- Avon Community Unit School District 176 — consolidated with Abingdon Community Unit School District 217 to form Abingdon-Avon Community Unit School District 276 in 2013
- Farmington East Community Unit School District 324 — consolidated with Yates City Community Unit School District 207 to form Farmington Central Community Unit School District 265 in 1987
- South Fulton Community Consolidated School District 330 — annexed into Lewistown School District 141 in 1986
- Prichard Clark Community Elementary School District 340 — consolidated with Saint David School District 87, Lewistown School District 141 and Lewistown Community High School District 341 to form Lewistown Community Unit School District 97 in 1997
- Lewistown Community High School District 341 — consolidated with Saint David School District 87, Lewistown School District 141 and Prichard Clark Community Elementary School District 340 to form Lewistown Community Unit School District 97 in 1997

=== Gallatin County ===
- North Gallatin Community Unit School District 1 — consolidated with Southeast Gallatin Community Unit School District 2 and Equality Community Unit School District 4 to form Gallatin Community Unit School District 7 in 1987
- Southeast Gallatin Community Unit School District 2 — consolidated with North Gallatin Community Unit School District 1 and Equality Community Unit School District 4 to form Gallatin Community Unit School District 7 in 1987
- Equality Community Unit School District 4 — consolidated with North Gallatin Community Unit School District 1 and Southeast Gallatin Community Unit School District 2 to form Gallatin Community Unit School District 7 in 1987

=== Grundy County ===
- Mazon-Verona-Kinsman Community Unit School District 2 — annexed and converted into Mazon-Verona-Kinsman Elementary School District 2C and Seneca Township High School District 160 in 1990
- Goodfarm Community Consolidated School District 35C — annexed into Dwight Common School District 232 in 1990

=== Hancock County ===
- Plymouth Community Consolidated School District 319 — annexed into Southeastern Community Unit School District 337 in 1992
- LaHarpe Community Unit School District 335 — converted into LaHarpe Community School District 347 and Illini West High School District 307 in 2007
- Dallas Community Unit School District 336 — deactivated into tuition for grades 9-12 to Nauvoo-Colusa Community School District 325 in 2001 and converted into Dallas Elementary School District 327 and Illini West High School District 307 in 2007
- Carthage Community Unit School District 338 — converted into Carthage Elementary School District 317 and Illini West High School District 307 in 2007

=== Henderson County ===
- Union Community Unit School District 115 — consolidated with Southern Community School District 120 to form West Central Community Unit School District 235 in 2005
- Southern Community School District 120 — consolidated with Union Community Unit School District 115 to form West Central Community Unit School District 235 in 2005

=== Henry County ===
- Atkinson Community Unit School District 233 — annexed into Geneseo Community Unit School District 228 in 1988

=== Iroquois County ===
- Onarga Community Unit School District 1 — consolidated with Gilman-Danforth Community Unit School District 2 to form Iroquois West Community Unit School District 10 in 1983
- Gilman-Danforth Community Unit School District 2 — consolidated with Onarga Community Unit School District 1 to form Iroquois West Community Unit School District 10 in 1983
- Sheldon Community Unit School District 5 — annexed (dissolved) into Milford Township High School District 233 and Milford Community Consolidated School District 280 in 2003
- Wellington Community Unit School District 7 — annexed into Hoopeston Community Unit School District 11, Milford Township High School District 233 and Milford Community Consolidated School District 280 in 1987
- Buckley-Loda Community Unit School District 8 — consolidated with Paxton Community Unit School District 2 to form Paxton-Buckley-Loda Community Unit School District 10 in 1990
- Milford Township High School District 233 — consolidated with Milford Community Consolidated School District 280 to form Milford Area Public Schools District 124 in 2014
- Crescent-Iroquois High School District 252 — consolidated with Crescent City Community Consolidated School District 275 to form Crescent Iroquois Community Unit School District 249 in 2005
- Stockland Community Consolidated School District 253 — annexed into Milford Township High School District 233 and Milford Community Consolidated School District 280 in 1988
- Crescent City Community Consolidated School District 275 — consolidated with Crescent-Iroquois High School District 252 to form Crescent Iroquois Community Unit School District 249 in 2005
- Milford Community Consolidated School District 280 — consolidated with Milford Township High School District 233 to form Milford Area Public Schools District 124 in 2014
- Bryce-Ash Grove Community Consolidated School District 284 — annexed into Milford Community Consolidated School District 280 in 1994

=== Jackson County ===
- Glendale Community Consolidated School District 160 — annexed into Carbondale Elementary School District 95 in 1987
- Mississippi Valley Community Unit School District 166 — annexed into Trico Community Unit School District 176 and Murphysboro Community Unit School District 186 in 1991

=== Jefferson County ===
- Woodlawn Community Consolidated School District 4 — hybrid formed with Woodlawn Community High School District 205 into Woodlawn Unit School District 209 in 2015
- Dodds Community Consolidated School District 7 — consolidated with Ina Community Consolidated School District 8 to form Spring Garden School District 178 in 2015
- Ina Community Consolidated School District 8 — consolidated with Dodds Community Consolidated School District 7 to form Spring Garden School District 178 in 2015
- Bluford Community Consolidated School District 114 — hybrid formed with Webber Township High School District 204 into Bluford Unit School District 318 in 2015
- Webber Township High School District 204 — hybrid formed with Bluford Community Consolidated School District 114 into Bluford Unit School District 318 in 2015
- Woodlawn Community High School District 205 — hybrid formed with Woodlawn Community Consolidated School District 4 into Woodlawn Unit School District 209 in 2015

=== Jo Daviess County ===
- Elizabeth Community School District 208 — consolidated with Hanover Community School District 212 to form River Ridge Community Unit School District 210 in 1985
- Hanover Community School District 212 — consolidated with Elizabeth Community School District 208 to form River Ridge Community Unit School District 210 in 1985

=== Johnson County ===
- Goreville School District 18 — consolidated with Goreville Township High School District 71 to form Goreville Community Unit District 1 in 1987
- Goreville Township High School District 71 — consolidated with Goreville School District 18 to form Goreville Community Unit District 1 in 1987

=== Kankakee County ===
- R.U.C.E. Community Unit School District 3 (Reddick, Union Hill, Campus, and Essex) — annexed into Herscher Community Unit School District 2 in 1988
- St. Anne Community Consolidated School District 256 — hybrid formed with St. Anne Community High School District 302 into St. Anne Unit District 24 in 2024
- St. Anne Community High School District 302 — hybrid formed with St. Anne Community Consolidated School District 256 into St. Anne Unit District 24 in 2024

=== Knox County ===
- Yates City Community Unit School District 207 — consolidated with Farmington East Community Unit School District 324 to form Farmington Central Community Unit School District 265 in 1987
- Abingdon Community Unit School District 217 — consolidated with Avon Community Unit School District 176 to form Abingdon-Avon Community Unit School District 276 in 2013

=== Lake County ===
- Lotus School District 10 — annexed into Fox Lake School District 114 in 1990
- Newport Community Consolidated School District 11 — annexed into Beach Park Community Consolidated School District 3 in 1986
- Avon Center School District 47 — annexed into Grayslake Community Consolidated School District 46 in 1988
- North Chicago Elementary School District 64 — consolidated with North Chicago High School District 123 to form North Chicago School District 187 in 1989
- Highland Park School District 107 — consolidated with Highland Park School District 108 and Highwood-Highland Park School District 111 to form North Shore School District 112 in 1993
- Highland Park School District 108 — consolidated with Highland Park School District 107 and Highwood-Highland Park School District 111 to form North Shore School District 112 in 1993
- Highwood-Highland Park School District 111 — consolidated with Highland Park School District 107 and Highland Park School District 108 to form North Shore School District 112 in 1993
- North Chicago High School District 123 — consilidated with North Chicago Elementary School District 64 to form North Chicago School District 187 in 1989

=== LaSalle County ===
- Lostant Community Consolidated School District 25 — consolidated with Lostant Community High School District 400 to form Lostant Community Unit School District 425 in 1993
- Eagle Elementary School District 43 — consolidated with Streator Elementary School District 45 to from Streator Elementary School District 44 in 1989
- Streator Elementary School District 45 — consolidated with Eagle Elementary School District 43 to from Streator Elementary School District 44 in 1989
- Otter Creek-Hyatt School District 56 — annexed into Allen Township Community Consolidated School District 65 in 2003, which was renamed Allen-Otter Creek Community Consolidated School District 65
- Minonk-Dana-Rutland Community Unit School District 108 — consolidated with Wenona Community Unit School District 1 and Toluca Community Unit School District 2 to from Fieldcrest Community Unit School District 6 in 1992
- John F. Kennedy Community Consolidated School District 129 — annexed into Oglesby Elementary School District 125 in 1993
- Utica School District 135 — annexed into Waltham Community Consolidated School District 185 in 2003
- Marseilles Community Unit School District 155 — annexed and converted into Ottawa Township High School District 140 and Marseilles Elementary School District 150 in 1990
- Ophir Community Consolidated School District 235 — annexed into Mendota Community Consolidated School District 289 in 1998
- Tonica High School District 360 — annexed into LaSalle-Peru Township High School District 120 in 1990
- Lostant Community High School District 400 — consolidated with Lostant Community Consolidated School District 25 to form Lostant Community Unit School District 425 in 1993

=== Lee County ===
- Nelson Public School District 8 — consolidated with East Coloma School District 12 to form East Coloma-Nelson Consolidated Elementary School District 20 in 2013

=== Livingston County ===
- Chatsworth Community Unit School District 1 — consolidated with Forrest Strawn Wing Community Unit School District 2 and Fairbury-Cropsey Community Unit School District 3 to form Prairie Central Community Unit School District 8 in 1985
- Forrest Strawn Wing Community Unit School District 2 — consolidated with Chatsworth Community Unit School District 1 and Fairbury-Cropsey Community Unit School District 3 to form Prairie Central Community Unit School District 8 in 1985
- Fairbury-Cropsey Community Unit School District 3 — consolidated with Chatsworth Community Unit School District 1 and Forrest Strawn Wing Community Unit School District 2 to form Prairie Central Community Unit School District 8 in 1985
- Flanagan Community Unit School District 4 — hybrid formed with Cornell Community High School District 70 into Flanagan-Cornell Unit 74, in 2008
- Saunemin Community Unit School District 6 — annexed and converted into Pontiac Township High School District 90 and Saunemin Community Consolidated School District 438 in 1987
- Cornell Community High School District 70 — deactivated into tuition to Flanagan Community Unit School District 4 in 1987 and hybrid formed with that district into Flanagan-Cornell Unit 74 in 2008
- Odell Community High School District 160 — annexed into Pontiac Township High School District 90 in 1987
- Pontiac Esmen Community Consolidated School District 430 — annexed into Pontiac Community Consolidated School District 429 in 1997
- Sunbury Community Consolidated School District 431 — annexed into Allen Township Community Consolidated School District 65, Dwight Community Consolidated School District 232, Cornell Community Consolidated School District 426 and Odell Community Consolidated School District 435 in 1991
- Owego Community Consolidated School District 434 — annexed into Pontiac Community Consolidated School District 429 in 1993

=== Logan County ===
- Beason Community Consolidated School District 17 — annexed into Chester-East Lincoln Community Consolidated School District 61 in 1994
- New Holland-Middletown Community Unit School District 22 — annexed and converted into New Holland-Middletown Elementary School District 88 and Lincoln Community High School District 404 in 1988
- Broadwell Community Consolidated School District 68 — consolidated with West Lincoln Community Consolidated School District 72 to form West Lincoln-Broadwell Elementary School District 92 in 1992
- West Lincoln Community Consolidated School District 72 — consolidated with Broadwell Community Consolidated School District 68 to form West Lincoln-Broadwell Elementary School District 92 in 1992

=== Macon County ===
- Macon Community Unit School District 5 — consolidated with Blue Mound-Boody Community Unit School District 10 to form Meridian Community Unit School District 15 in 1994
- Niantic-Harristown Community Unit School District 6 — consolidated with Illiopolis Community Unit School District 12 to form Sangamon Valley Community Unit School District 9 in 2004
- Blue Mound-Boody Community Unit School District 10 — consolidated with Macon Community Unit School District 5 to form Meridian Community Unit School District 15 in 1994

=== Macoupin County ===
- Girard Community Unit School District 3 — consolidated with Virden Community Unit School District 4 to form North Mac Community Unit School District 34 in 2010
- Virden Community Unit School District 4 — consolidated with Girard Community Unit School District 3 to form North Mac Community Unit School District 34 in 2010

=== Madison County ===
- Livingston Community Consolidated School District 4 — annexed into Staunton Community Unit School District 6 in 2004
- Worden Community Unit School District 16 — annexed into Edwardsville Community Unit School District 7 in 1988

=== Marion County ===
- Odin School District 122 — consolidated with Odin Community High School District 700 to form Odin Public School District 722 in 2011
- Kinmundy Alma Community Unit School District 301 — consolidated with LaGrove Community Unit School District 206 to form South Central Community Unit School District 401 in 1989
- Odin Community High School District 700 — consolidated with Odin School District 122 to form Odin Public School District 722 in 2011

=== Marshall County ===
- Wenona Community Unit School District 1 — consolidated with Toluca Community Unit School District 2 and Minonk-Dana-Rutland Community Unit School District 108 to from Fieldcrest Community Unit School District 6 in 1992
- Toluca Community Unit School District 2 — consolidated with Toluca Community Unit School District 2 and Minonk-Dana-Rutland Community Unit School District 108 to from Fieldcrest Community Unit School District 6 in 1992
- Sparland Unit School District 3 — consolidated with Mid-County Unit School District 4 to form Midland Community Unit School District 7 in 1995
- Mid-County Unit School District 4 — consolidated with Sparland Unit School District 3 to form Midland Community Unit School District 7 in 1995
- Henry-Senachwine Community School District 20 — consolidated with Henry Community Consolidated School District 35 and Senachwine Community School District 534 to form Henry-Senachwine Community Unit School District 5 in 1989
- Henry Community Consolidated School District 35 — consolidated with Henry-Senachwine Community School District 20 and Senachwine Community School District 534 to form Henry-Senachwine Community Unit School District 5 in 1989

=== Mason County ===
- Easton Community Unit School District 121 — consolidated with San Jose Community Unit School District 122 and Mason City Community Unit School District 123 to form Illini Central Community Unit School District 189 in 1989
- San Jose Community Unit School District 122 — consolidated with Easton Community Unit School District 121 and Mason City Community Unit School District 123 to form Illini Central Community Unit School District 189 in 1989
- Mason City Community Unit School District 123 — consolidated with Easton Community Unit School District 121 and San Jose Community Unit School District 122 to form Illini Central Community Unit School District 189 in 1989
- Forman Community Unit School District 124 — consolidated with Green Valley Community High School District 306 and Green Valley Community Consolidated School District 695 to form Midwest Central Community Unit School District 191 in 1991
- Balyki Community Unit School District 125 — annexed into Havana Community Unit School District 126 in 1992

=== Massac County ===
- Maple Grove Community Consolidated School District 17 — consolidated with Joppa Community High School District 21 to form Joppa-Maple Grove Unit District 38 in 1987
- Joppa Community High School District 21 — consolidated with Maple Grove Community Consolidated School District 17 to form Joppa-Maple Grove Unit District 38 in 1987

=== McDonough County ===
- Industry Community Unit School District 165 — consolidated with Schuyler County Community Unit School District 1 to form Schuyler-Industry Community Unit School District 5 in 2005
- Northwest Community Unit School District 175 — consolidated with Colchester Community Unit School District 180 to form West Prairie Community Unit School District 103 in 2003
- Colchester Community Unit School District 180 — consolidated with Northwest Community Unit School District 175 to form West Prairie Community Unit School District 103 in 2003

=== McHenry County ===
- Union Community School District 8 — consolidated with Hawthorn Community Consolidated School District 17 and Marengo Community School District 140 to form Marengo-Union Elementary School District 165 in 1987
- Spring Grove School District 11 — consolidated with Richmond Community School District 13 to form Nippersink School District 2 in 2000
- Richmond Community School District 13 — consolidated with Spring Grove School District 11 to form Nippersink School District 2 in 2000
- Hawthorn Community Consolidated School District 17 — consolidated with Union Community School District 8 and Marengo Community School District 140 to form Marengo-Union Elementary School District 165 in 1987
- Marengo Community School District 140 — consolidated with Union Community School District 8 and Hawthorn Community Consolidated School District 17 to form Marengo-Union Elementary School District 165 in 1987

=== McLean County ===
- Octavia Community Unit School District 8 — consolidated with Saybrook-Arrowsmith Community Unit School District 11 to form Ridgeview Community Unit School District 19 in 1989
- Chenoa Community Unit School District 9 — annexed (dissolved) into Prairie Central Community Unit School District 8 in 2004
- Gridley Community Unit School District 10 — consolidated with El Paso Community Unit School District 375 to form El Paso-Gridley Community Unit School District 11 in 2004
- Saybrook-Arrowsmith Community Unit School District 11 — consolidated with Octavia Community Unit School District 8 to form Ridgeview Community Unit School District 19 in 1989
- Bellflower Community Consolidated School District 88 — consolidated with Farmer City/Mansfield Community Unit School District 17 and Bellflower Township High School District 311 to form Blue Ridge Community Unit School District 18 in 1985
- Bellflower Township High School District 311 — consolidated with Farmer City/Mansfield Community Unit School District 17 and Bellflower Community Consolidated School District 88 to form Blue Ridge Community Unit School District 18 in 1985

=== Mercer County ===
- Aledo Community Unit School District 201 — consolidated with Westmer Community Unit School District 203 to form Mercer County School District 404 in 2009
- Winola Community Unit School District 202 — annexed into Sherrard Community Unit School District 200 in 1988
- Westmer Community Unit School District 203 — consolidated with Aledo Community Unit School District 201 to form Mercer County School District 404 in 2009

=== Montgomery County ===
- Witt Community Unit School District 66 — annexed into Hillsboro Community Unit School District 3 in 1997

=== Moultrie County ===
- Bethany Community Unit School District 301 — consolidated with Findlay Community Unit School District 2 to form Okaw Valley Community Unit School District 302 in 2001
- Lovington Community Unit School District 303 — annexed into Arthur Community Unit School District 305 in 2012

=== Ogle County ===
- Leaf River Community Unit School District 70 — annexed into Forrestville Valley Community Unit School District 221 in 1989
- Mount Morris Community Unit School District 261 — annexed into Oregon Community Unit School District 220 in 1994

=== Peoria County ===
- Bellevue Elementary School District 152 — annexed into Norwood Elementary School District 63 in 1990

=== Perry County ===
- Tamaroa Community High School District 102 — annexed into Pinckneyville Community High School District 101 in 1988
- Community Consolidated School District 211 (Tamaroa) — annexed into Community Consolidated School District 204 in 1993
- Pinckneyville School District 212 — annexed into Pinckneyville School District 50 in 1986

=== Piatt County ===
- Atwood Hammond Community Unit School District 39 — annexed into Arthur Community Unit School District 305 in 2014

=== Pike County ===
- Barry Community United School District 1 — consolidated with West Pike Community Unit School District 2 to form Western Community Unit School District 12 in 2007
- West Pike Community Unit School District 2 — consolidated with Barry Community United School District 1 to form Western Community Unit School District 12 in 2007
- Perry School District 57 — annexed into Griggsville Community Unit School District 4 in 1995, which was renamed Griggsville-Perry Community Unit School District 4
- Perry Community High School District 172 — annexed into Griggsville Community Unit School District 4 in 1995, which was renamed Griggsville-Perry Community Unit School District 4

=== Putnam County ===
- Senachwine Community School District 534 — consolidated with Henry-Senachwine Community School District 20 and Henry Community Consolidated School District 35 to form Henry-Senachwine Community Unit School District 5 in 1989

=== Randolph County ===
- Kaskaskia Community School District 124 — annexed into Chester Community Unit School District 139 in 1989

=== Richland County ===
- West Richland Community Unit School District 2 — annexed (dissolved) into East Richland Community Unit School District 1 in 2014, which was renamed Richland County Community Unit School District 1

=== Sangamon County ===
- Illiopolis Community Unit School District 12 — consolidated with Niantic-Harristown Community Unit School District 6 to form Sangamon Valley Community Unit School District 9 in 2004
- Divernon Community Unit School District 13 — annexed (dissolved) into Auburn Community Unit School District 10 in 2007

=== Schuyler County ===
- Schuyler County Community Unit School District 1 — consolidated with Industry Community Unit School District 165 to form Schuyler-Industry Community Unit School District 5 in 2005

=== Shelby County ===
- Findlay Community Unit School District 2 — consolidated with Bethany Community Unit School District 301 to form Okaw Valley Community Unit School District 302 in 2001
- Tower Hill Community Unit School District 6 — annexed into Pana Community School District 8 in 2003
- Moweaqua Community School District 6A — consolidated with Assumption Community Unit School District 9 to form Central A&M Community Unit District 21 in 1992
- Tower Hill Community Consolidated School District 10 — consolidated with Tower Hill Community High School District 185 to form Tower Hill Community Unit School District 6 in 1998
- Cowden-Herrick Community Consolidated District 11 — consolidated with Cowden-Herrick Community High School District 188 to form Cowden-Herrick Community Unit School District 3A in 1998
- Tower Hill Community High School District 185 — consolidated with Tower Hill Community Consolidated School District 10 to form Tower Hill Community Unit School District 6 in 1998
- Cowden-Herrick Community High School District 188 — consolidated with Cowden-Herrick Community Consolidated District 11 to form Cowden-Herrick Community Unit School District 3A in 1998

=== Stark County ===
- Toulon-LaFayette Community Unit School District 2 — consolidated with Wyoming Community Consolidated School District 27 and Wyoming Community High School District 71 to form Stark County Community Unit School District 100 in 1992
- Wyoming Community Consolidated School District 27 — consolidated with Toulon-LaFayette Community Unit School District 2 and Wyoming Community High School District 71 to form Stark County Community Unit School District 100 in 1992
- Valley Community Consolidated School District 45 — annexed into Wyoming Community Consolidated School District 27 in 1991
- Wyoming Community High School District 71 — consolidated with Toulon-LaFayette Community Unit School District 2 and Wyoming Community Consolidated School District 27 to form Stark County Community Unit School District 100 in 1992

=== Tazewell County ===
- Green Valley Community High School District 306 — consolidated with Forman Community Unit School District 124 and Green Valley Community Consolidated School District 695 to form Midwest Central Community Unit School District 191 in 1991
- Pleasant View Community School District 622 — annexed into Washington School District 52 in 1994
- Green Valley Community Consolidated School District 695 — consolidated with Forman Community Unit School District 124 and Green Valley Community High School District 306 to form Midwest Central Community Unit School District 191 in 1991

=== Vermilion County ===
- Georgetown Community Unit School District 3 — consolidated with Ridge Farm Community Unit School District 9 to form Georgetown-Ridge Farm Community Unit District 4 in 1987
- Catlin Community Unit School District 5 — consolidated with Jamaica Community Unit School District 12 to form Salt Fork Community Unit School District 512 in 2015
- Rankin School District 8 — annexed into Hoopeston Community Unit School District 11 in 1992
- Ridge Farm Community Unit School District 9 — consolidated with Georgetown Community Unit School District 3 to form Georgetown-Ridge Farm Community Unit District 4 in 1987
- Jamaica Community Unit School District 12 — consolidated with Catlin Community Unit School District 5 to form Salt Fork Community Unit School District 512 in 2015
- Rankin Township High School District 223 — deactivated into tuition to Hoopeston Community Unit School District 11 in 1987 and annexed into that district in 1992

=== Warren County ===
- Monmouth Unit School District 38 — consolidated with Roseville Community Unit School District 200 to form Monmouth-Roseville Community Unit School District 238 in 2005
- Roseville Community Unit School District 200 — consolidated with Monmouth Unit School District 38 to form Monmouth-Roseville Community Unit School District 238 in 2005
- Warren Community Unit School District 222 — consolidated with Alexis Community Unit School District 400 to form United Community Unit School District 304 om 2004
- Yorkwood Community Unit School District 225 — annexed into United Community Unit School District 304 in 2007
- Alexis Community Unit School District 400 — consolidated with Warren Community Unit School District 222 to form United Community Unit School District 304 om 2004

=== Washington County ===
- Hoyleton Consolidated School District 29 — annexed (dissolved) into Nashville CCSD 49 in 2015

=== Wayne County ===
- Mill Shoals Community Consolidated School District 18 — annexed into New Hope Community Consolidated School District 6 in 1991
- Merriam Community Consolidated School District 19 — annexed into New Hope Community Consolidated School District 6 and Fairfield Public School District 112 in 2004

=== White County ===
- Crossville Community Unit School District 2 — annexed into Carmi-White County Community Unit School District 5 in 1988
- Enfield Community Unit School District 4 — annexed into Norris City-Omaha Community Unit School District 3 in 1985, which was renamed Norris City-Omaha-Enfield Community Unit School District 3

=== Whiteside County ===
- Tampico Community Unit School District 4 — annexed into Prophetstown-Lyndon Community Unit School District 3 in 1996, which was renamed Prophetstown-Lyndon-Tampico Community Unit School District 3
- East Coloma School District 12 — consolidated with Nelson Public School District 8 to form East Coloma-Nelson Consolidated Elementary School District 20 in 2013
- Riverdale School District 14 — annexed (dissolved) into Rock Falls Elementary School District 13 in 2012

=== Woodford County ===
- El Paso Community Unit School District 375 — consolidated with Gridley Community Unit School District 10 to form El Paso-Gridley Community Unit School District 11 in 2004

== See also ==
- Illinois Community College System — includes information on community college districts (formerly known as junior college districts)
