= Skokie School District =

Skokie School District may refer to:

- Skokie School District 68
- Skokie School District 73½

See also:

- Skokie/Morton Grove School District 69
- Evanston/Skokie School District 65
