= Zion Elementary School District 6 =

School district in Illinois, United States

Location
- 2800 29th St Zion, Illinois United States
- Coordinates: 42.4556°N 87.8341°W

District information
- Type: Public Schools
- Motto: Excellence Without Exception
- Grades: K-8
- Superintendent: Dr. Julious Lawson
- Schools: Shiloh Park, West, East, Elmwood, Beulah Park, Zion Central
- NCES District ID: 1743860

Students and staff
- Students: 2,681
- Teachers: 179.50 (on FTE basis)
- Staff: 350
- Student–teacher ratio: 14.94:1

Other information
- Website: www.zion6.org

Zion Elementary School District 6 is an Illinois school district serving Zion, Lake County. The school district governs seven schools. Lakeview Elementary School, Beulah Park Elementary School, and East Elementary School serve students between prekindergarten and second grade. Elmwood Elementary School and West Elementary School serve students between third and fifth grades. Zion Elementary School District 6's middle schools, Zion Central Middle School, and Shiloh Park Middle School serve the sixth and eighth grades.
