= Skokie, Illinois =

Village in Illinois, US

- Village
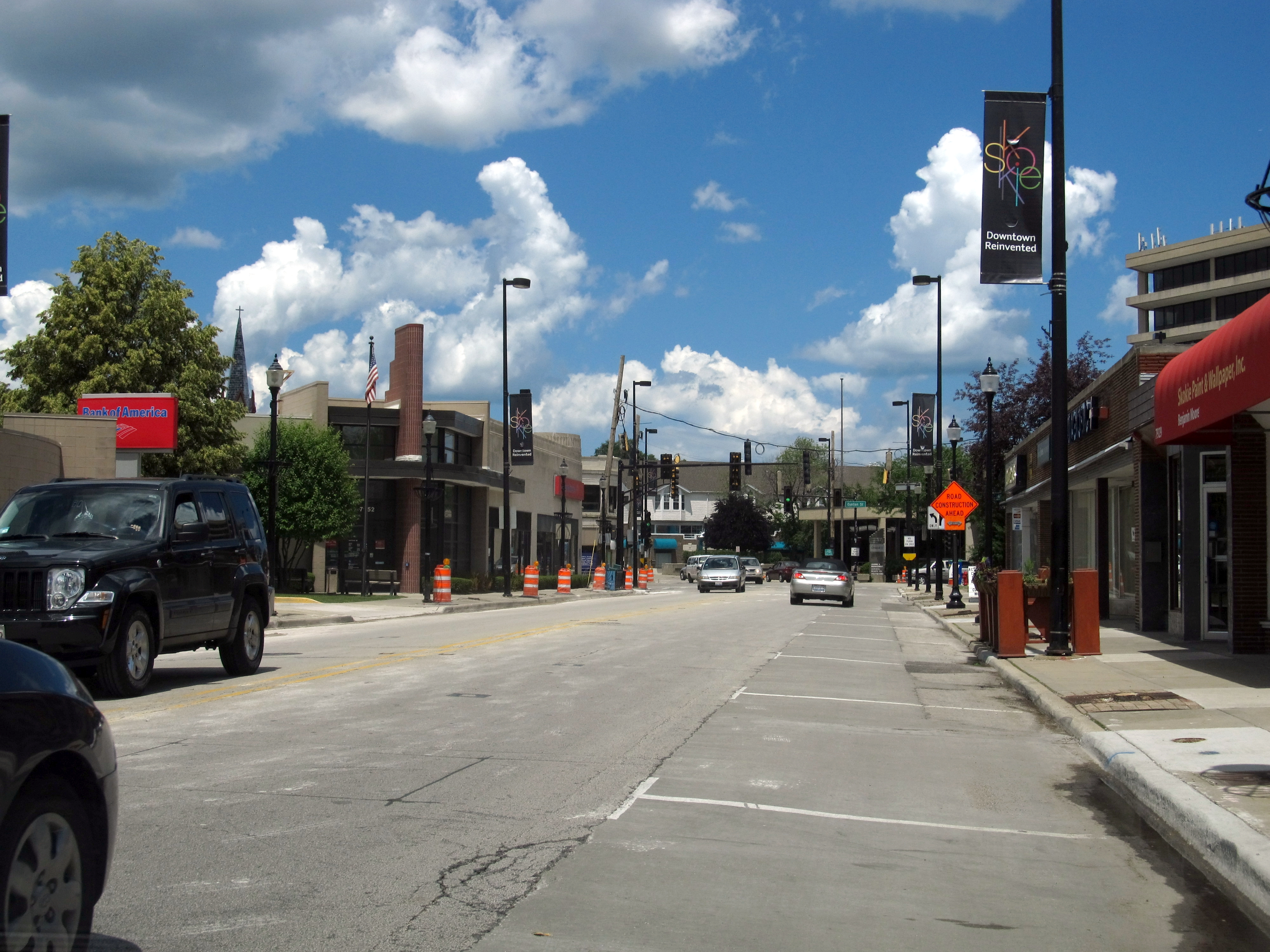
- Downtown Skokie in 2013

- Flag Logo
- Interactive map of Skokie, Illinois
- Location within Greater Chicago Location within Illinois Location within the United States
- Coordinates: 42°02′01″N 87°43′58″W
- Country: United States
- State: Illinois
- County: Cook
- Township: Niles
- Incorporated: 1888; 138 years ago

Government
  - Type: Council–manager
  - Mayor: Ann Tennes

Area
  - Total: 10.07 sq mi (26.07 km^{2})
  - Land: 10.07 sq mi (26.07 km^{2})
  - Water: 0 sq mi (0.00 km^{2}) 0%

Population (2020)
  - Total: 67,824
  - Estimate (2024): 65,850 ▼
  - Density: 6,739.2/sq mi (2,602.03/km^{2})
- Up 2.27% from 2000

Standard of living (2011)
  - Per capita income: $32,169
  - Median home value: $297,900
- ZIP code(s): 60076, 60077, 60203
- Area code(s): 847 & 224
- Geocode: 70122
- FIPS code: 17-70122
- Website: skokie.org

Skokie (/ˈskoʊki/; formerly Niles Center) is a village in Cook County, Illinois, United States. According to the 2020 census, its population was 67,824. Skokie lies approximately 15 miles (24 km) north of Chicago's downtown Loop. The name Skokie comes from a Potawatomi word for 'marsh'. For many years, Skokie promoted itself as "The World's Largest Village". Skokie's streets, like those of many suburbs, are largely a continuation of the Chicago street grid, and the village is served by the Chicago Transit Authority by both bus and rail, further cementing its connection to the city.

Skokie was originally a German-Luxembourger farming community, but was later settled by a sizeable Jewish population, especially after World War II. At its peak in the mid-1960s, nearly 60% of the population was Jewish, the largest proportion of any Chicago suburb. Skokie still has many Jewish residents (now about 30% of the population) and over a dozen synagogues. It is home to the Illinois Holocaust Museum and Education Center, which opened in northwest Skokie in 2009.

Skokie has twice received national attention for court cases decided by the United States Supreme Court. In the mid-1970s, it was at the center of National Socialist Party of America v. Village of Skokie, in which a Nazi group, backed by the American Civil Liberties Union, invoked the First Amendment in an attempt to schedule a Nazi rally in Skokie. At the time, Skokie had a significant population of Holocaust survivors. Skokie ultimately lost that case, though the planned rally was never held there; instead, the group first demonstrated in downtown Chicago and later held a rally in Marquette Park.

== History ==
=== Beginnings ===
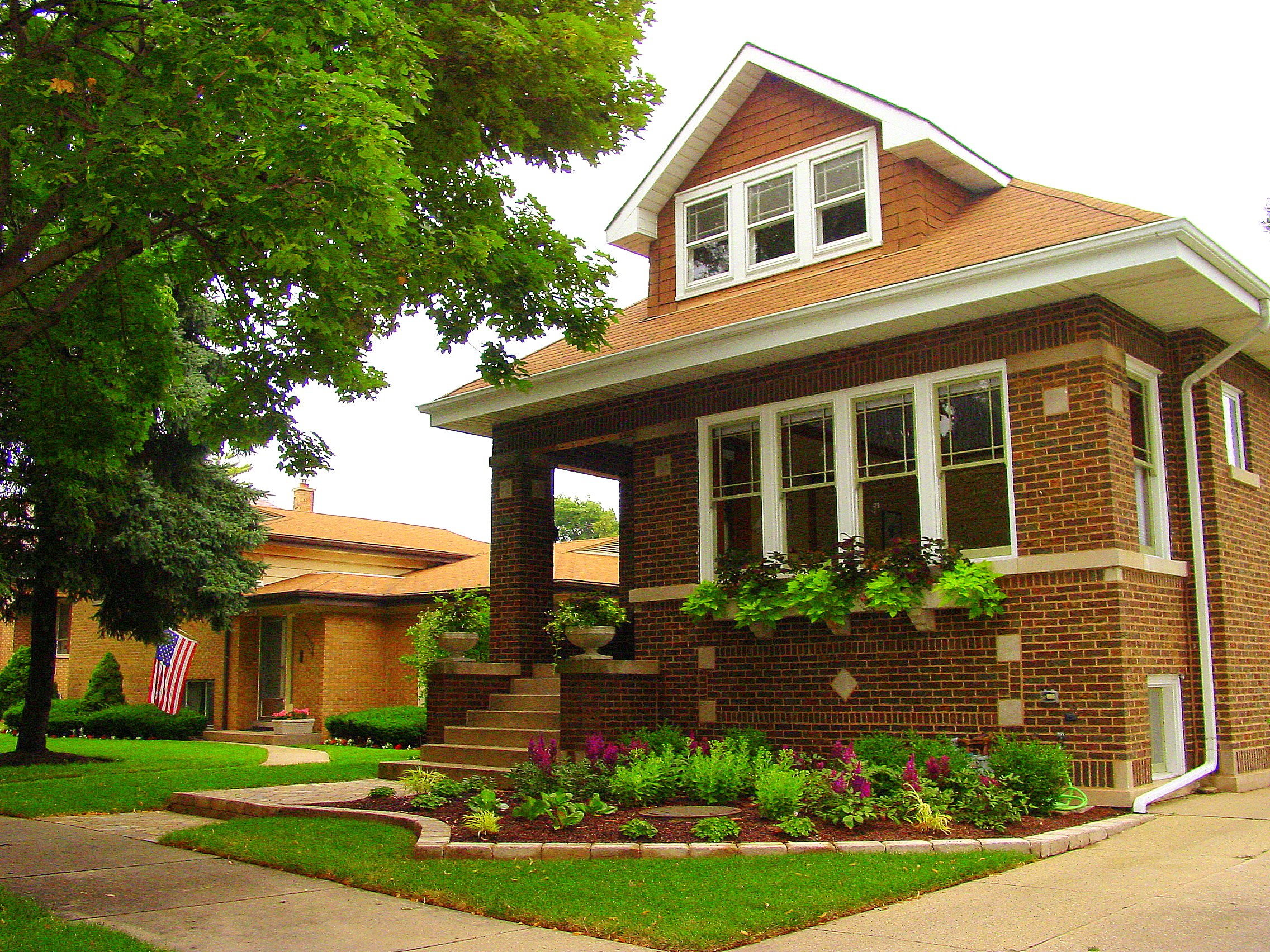
A 1925 "Chicago"-style bungalow in Skokie

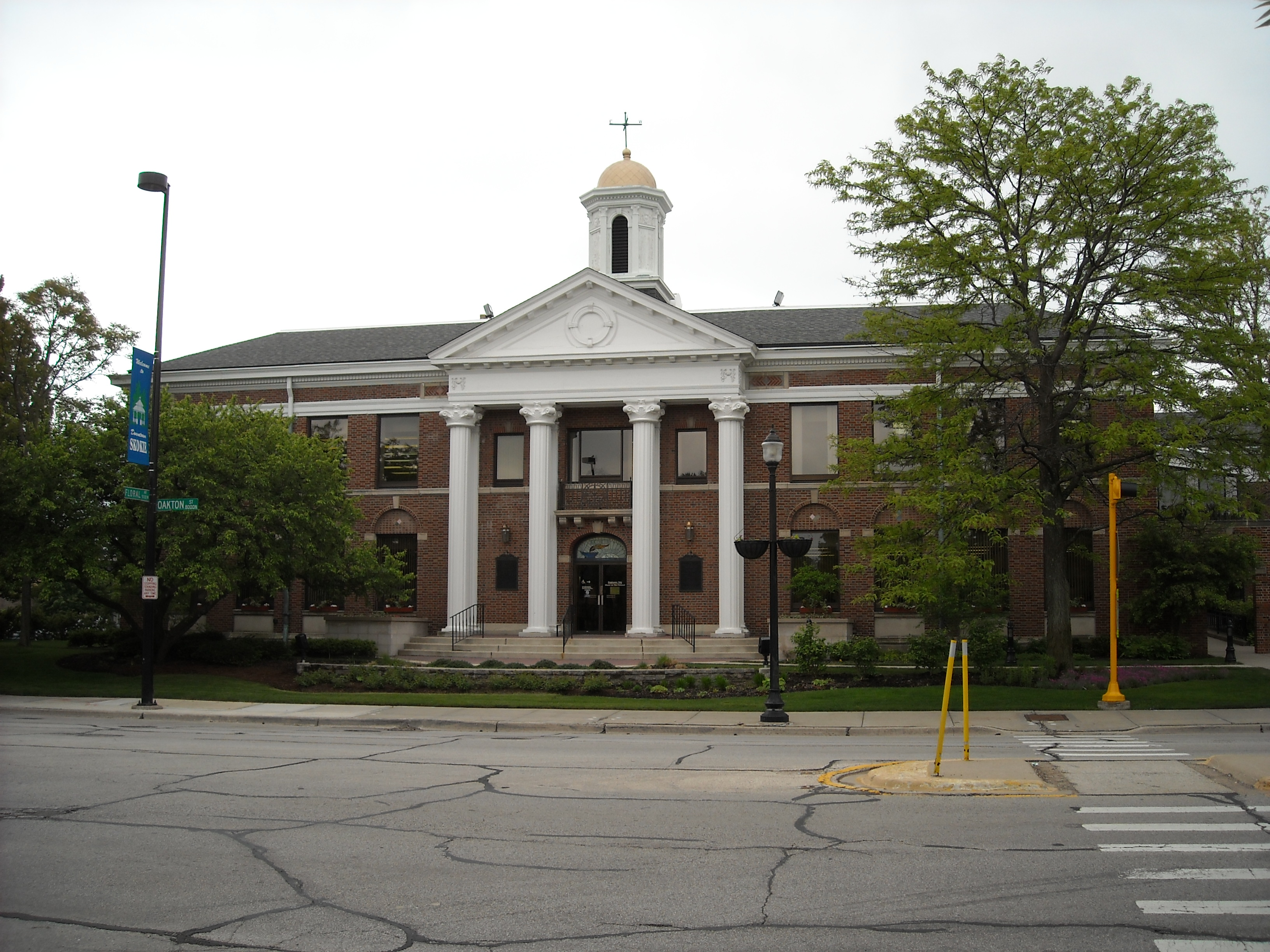
Skokie Village Hall

In 1888, the community was incorporated as Niles Centre. About 1910, the spelling was Americanized to "Niles Center". However, the name caused postal confusion with the neighboring village of Niles. A village-renaming campaign began in the 1930s. In a referendum on November 15, 1940, residents chose the Native American name "Skokie" over the name "Devonshire".

Historic Bronx Building - (1927)

During the real estate boom of the 1920s, large parcels were subdivided; many two- and three-flat apartment buildings were built, with the "Chicago"-style bungalow a dominant architectural specimen. This coincided with train line service reaching the town beginning on March 28, 1925. Large-scale development ended as a result of the Great Crash of 1929 and consequent Great Depression. It was not until the 1940s and the 1950s, when parents of the baby boom generation moved their families out of Chicago, that Skokie's housing development began again. Consequently, the village developed commercially, an example being the Old Orchard Shopping Center, currently named Westfield Old Orchard.

During the night of November 27–28, 1934, after a gunfight in nearby Barrington that left two FBI agents dead, two accomplices of notorious 25-year-old bank-robber Baby Face Nelson (Lester Gillis) dumped his bullet-riddled body in a ditch along Niles Center Road adjoining the St. Peter Catholic Cemetery, a block north of Oakton Street in the town.

The first African-American family to move to Skokie arrived in 1961, and open-housing activists helped to integrate the suburb subsequently.

=== Name ===
Historic maps named the Skokie marsh as Chewab Skokie, a probable derivation from Kitchi-wap choku, a Potawatomi term meaning 'great marsh'. Other Indigenous names include skoutay or scoti, an Algonquian words for 'fire'. "Skokie Marsh" was used by local botanists, notably Henry Chandler Cowles, as early as 1901. The village name was changed from "Niles Center" to "Skokie" by referendum in 1940. The name change may also have been influenced by James Foster Porter, a Chicago resident, who had explored the "Skoki Valley" in Banff National Park in Canada in 1911 and admired the name; Porter supported the name "Skokie" in the referendum.

=== Jewish community ===
Skokie attracted Jewish residents as newcomers did not face the same level of hostility as they did in some other Chicago suburbs, where it wasn't supported to sell property to Jewish institutions. In the post-World War II real-estate developers and builders that were often Jewish themselves, advertised Skokie in the older, urban Jewish neighborhoods in the South, West and North Sides of Chicago. New arrivals were also drawn to the urban planning vision of the Skokie Villager Master Plan of 1946, with its focus on fostering single-family homes rather than apartment living. By 1975, Jewish residents made up 57% of the suburb's population.

An estimated 8,000 Jewish Holocaust survivors settled in Skokie in the 1950s, 1960s and 1970s, making up 10% of the Jewish community in 1978. Yiddish was widely spoken and the area developed a Jewish character with synagogues, Hebrew Schools, Jewish delis, kosher butchers, Israeli bakeries and Judaica stores. Survivors mostly socialized among each other.

In 1964, Joseph Neumann, a Skokie resident and survivor of Auschwitz, provided testimony at the trial of one of the concentration camp's guards.

In early 1960's, Skokie Valley Traditional synagogue was one of four synagogues in the Chicago area that was attacked. The synagogue, now known as Skokie Valley Agudath Jacob Synagogue, has become the largest Orthodox Jewish congregation in Chicago.

In 1962, the Jewish Reconstructionist Federation held its annual conference in the suburb.

In 1970, Dr. Korczak Terrace was dedicated in Skokie, honoring a Polish Jewish martyr, Janusz Korczak.

In 1987, Skokie unveiled a bronze Holocaust memorial statue.

=== Supreme Court rulings ===
Twice in its history, Skokie has been the focal point of cases before the United States Supreme Court. National Socialist Party of America v. Village of Skokie, 432 U.S. 43 (1977), involved a First Amendment issue. Solid Waste Agency of Northern Cook County (SWANCC) v. U.S. Army Corps of Engineers, 531 U.S. 159 (2001) touched upon the Commerce Clause.

==== National Socialist Party of America v. Village of Skokie ====
In 1977 and 1978, Illinois neo-Nazis of the National Socialist Party of America (NSPA) attempted to hold a march in Skokie, far from their headquarters on Chicago's south side. Originally, the neo-Nazis had planned a political rally in Marquette Park in Chicago. The park is located in what was then a predominantly all-white neighborhood, similar to the situation in 1966, when a crowd of 4,000 Marquette Park residents gathered to watch Martin Luther King Jr. lead a march, some waving Confederate flags or throwing bottles, bricks and rocks at the protesters; King was knocked to his knees when struck by a rock. However, the Chicago authorities thwarted the NSPA's plans.

Seeking another free-speech political venue, the NSPA group chose to march on Skokie. Given the many Holocaust survivors living in Skokie, the village's government thought the Nazi march would be disruptive, and refused the NSPA permission to hold the event. The NSPA appealed that decision, and the American Civil Liberties Union interceded on their behalf, in National Socialist Party of America v. Village of Skokie. An Illinois appeals court raised the injunction issued by a Cook County Circuit Court judge, ruling that the presence of the swastika, the Nazi emblem, would constitute deliberate provocation of the people of Skokie. However, the Court also ruled that Skokie's attorneys had failed to prove that either the Nazi uniform or their printed materials, which it was alleged that the Nazis intended to distribute, would incite violence.

Moreover, because Chicago subsequently lifted its Marquette Park political demonstration ban, the NSPA ultimately held its rally in Chicago. The attempted Illinois Nazi march on Skokie was dramatized in the television film Skokie in 1981. It was satirized in the film The Blues Brothers in 1980.

==== Migratory bird rule ====
In 2001, the decision by Skokie and 22 other communities belonging to the Solid Waste Agency of Northern Cook County to use an isolated wetland as a solid waste disposal site resulted in a lawsuit. Ultimately, the case went all the way to the United States Supreme Court, and resulted in an overturn of the federal migratory bird rule.

== Geography ==
According to the 2010 census, Skokie has a total area of 10.06 square miles (26.06 km^{2}), all land. The village is bordered by Evanston to the east, Chicago to the southeast and southwest, Lincolnwood to the south, Niles to the southwest, Morton Grove to the west, Glenview to the northwest, and Wilmette to the north.

The village's street circulation is a street-grid pattern, with a major east–west thoroughfare every half mile: Old Orchard Road, Golf Road, Church Street, Dempster Street, Main Street, Oakton Street, Howard Street, and Touhy Avenue. The major north–south thoroughfares are Skokie Boulevard, Crawford Avenue, and McCormick Boulevard; the major diagonal streets are Lincoln Avenue, Niles Center Road, East Prairie Road and Gross Point Road.

Skokie's north–south streets continue the street names and (house number) grid values of Chicago's north—south streets—with the notable exceptions of Cicero Avenue, which is renamed Skokie Boulevard within Skokie, and Chicago's Pulaski Road retains its original Chicago City name, Crawford Avenue. The east–west streets continue Evanston's street names, but with Chicago grid values, such that Evanston's Dempster Street is 8800 north in Skokie addresses.

=== Climate ===
Skokie is in the Hot-summer humid continental climate, or Köppen Dfa zone. The zone includes four distinct seasons. Winter is cold with snow. Spring warms up with precipitation and storms, some of which can be severe and include tornadoes. Summer has high precipitation and storms. Fall cools down.

Climate data for Skokie, IL, based on Evanston (3 miles away)(rain)/O'Hare(temps) (1990-2020)
| Month | Jan | Feb | Mar | Apr | May | Jun | Jul | Aug | Sep | Oct | Nov | Dec | Year |
|---|---|---|---|---|---|---|---|---|---|---|---|---|---|
| Mean daily maximum °F (°C) | 31.6 (−0.2) | 35.7 (2.1) | 47.0 (8.3) | 59.0 (15.0) | 70.5 (21.4) | 80.4 (26.9) | 84.5 (29.2) | 82.5 (28.1) | 75.5 (24.2) | 62.8 (17.1) | 48.4 (9.1) | 36.6 (2.6) | 59.5 (15.3) |
| Daily mean °F (°C) | 25.2 (−3.8) | 28.8 (−1.8) | 39.0 (3.9) | 49.7 (9.8) | 60.6 (15.9) | 70.6 (21.4) | 75.4 (24.1) | 73.8 (23.2) | 66.3 (19.1) | 54.0 (12.2) | 41.3 (5.2) | 30.5 (−0.8) | 51.3 (10.7) |
| Mean daily minimum °F (°C) | 18.8 (−7.3) | 21.8 (−5.7) | 31.0 (−0.6) | 40.3 (4.6) | 50.6 (10.3) | 60.8 (16.0) | 66.4 (19.1) | 65.1 (18.4) | 57.1 (13.9) | 45.4 (7.4) | 34.1 (1.2) | 24.4 (−4.2) | 43.0 (6.1) |
| Average precipitation inches (mm) | 2.31 (59) | 2.15 (55) | 2.30 (58) | 3.92 (100) | 4.71 (120) | 4.51 (115) | 3.54 (90) | 4.47 (114) | 3.55 (90) | 3.77 (96) | 2.67 (68) | 2.42 (61) | 40.32 (1,026) |
| Average snowfall inches (cm) | 11.3 (29) | 10.7 (27) | 5.5 (14) | 1.3 (3.3) | 0 (0) | 0 (0) | 0 (0) | 0.0 (0.0) | 0 (0) | 0.2 (0.51) | 1.8 (4.6) | 7.6 (19) | 38.4 (97.41) |
Source: NWS/NOAA

== Demographics ==
Historical population
| Census | Pop. | Note | %± |
|---|---|---|---|
| 1900 | 529 | | — |
| 1910 | 568 | | 7.4% |
| 1920 | 763 | | 34.3% |
| 1930 | 5,007 | | 556.2% |
| 1940 | 7,172 | | 43.2% |
| 1950 | 14,832 | | 106.8% |
| 1960 | 59,364 | | 300.2% |
| 1970 | 68,322 | | 15.1% |
| 1980 | 60,278 | | −11.8% |
| 1990 | 59,432 | | −1.4% |
| 2000 | 63,348 | | 6.6% |
| 2010 | 64,784 | | 2.3% |
| 2020 | 67,824 | | 4.7% |
U.S. Decennial Census; 2010 2020

=== Racial and ethnic composition ===
Skokie village, Illinois – Racial and ethnic composition Note: the US Census treats Hispanic/Latino as an ethnic category. This table excludes Latinos from the racial categories and assigns them to a separate category. Hispanics/Latinos may be of any race.
| Race / Ethnicity (NH = Non-Hispanic) | Pop 2000 | Pop 2010 | Pop 2020 | % 2000 | % 2010 | % 2020 |
|---|---|---|---|---|---|---|
| White alone (NH) | 41,549 | 35,955 | 33,697 | 65.59% | 55.50% | 49.68% |
| Black or African American alone (NH) | 2,798 | 4,566 | 5,256 | 4.42% | 7.05% | 7.75% |
| Native American or Alaska Native alone (NH) | 65 | 70 | 56 | 0.10% | 0.11% | 0.08% |
| Asian alone (NH) | 13,425 | 16,437 | 18,726 | 21.19% | 25.37% | 27.61% |
| Pacific Islander alone (NH) | 15 | 13 | 23 | 0.02% | 0.02% | 0.03% |
| Other race alone (NH) | 119 | 185 | 424 | 0.19% | 0.29% | 0.63% |
| Mixed race or Multiracial (NH) | 1,757 | 1,830 | 2,457 | 2.77% | 2.82% | 3.62% |
| Hispanic or Latino (any race) | 3,620 | 5,728 | 7,185 | 5.71% | 8.84% | 10.59% |
| Total | 63,348 | 64,784 | 67,824 | 100.00% | 100.00% | 100.00% |

=== 2020 census ===
As of the 2020 census, Skokie had a population of 67,824 and a population density of 6,739.27 inhabitants per square mile (2,602.05/km^{2}). The median age was 42.8 years. 21.4% of residents were under the age of 18 and 20.7% of residents were 65 years of age or older. For every 100 females, there were 92.2 males, and for every 100 females age 18 and over, there were 89.0 males age 18 and over. 100.0% of residents lived in urban areas, while 0.0% lived in rural areas.

There were 24,173 households and 16,206 families in Skokie. Of all households, 32.3% had children under the age of 18 living in them, 55.2% were married-couple households, 14.6% were households with a male householder and no spouse or partner present, and 26.9% were households with a female householder and no spouse or partner present. About 23.5% of all households were made up of individuals, and 12.6% had someone living alone who was 65 years of age or older.

There were 25,256 housing units at an average density of 2,509.54 per square mile (968.94/km^{2}), of which 4.3% were vacant. The homeowner vacancy rate was 1.4% and the rental vacancy rate was 3.8%.

=== Income and poverty ===
The median income for a household in the village was $74,725, and the median income for a family was $93,491. Males had a median income of $46,915 versus $37,025 for females. The per capita income for the village was $37,827. About 7.5% of families and 9.7% of the population were below the poverty line, including 12.9% of those under age 18 and 8.8% of those age 65 or over.

=== Religion ===
Skokie is approximately 28% Jewish and has over a dozen synagogues.

=== Ethnic groups ===
Skokie also contains a sizeable Assyrian population. Some Assyrian American organizations, such as the Assyrian Universal Alliance Foundation, report that Assyrians make up the largest ethnic group in Skokie, with the population estimate being upwards of 20,000. The population of the local high school district, Niles Township High School District 219, is reported to be about 30% Assyrian, making them the largest ethnic group in the school district as well.

== Economy ==
The village's AAA bond rating attests to strong economic health via prudent fiscal management. In 2003, Skokie became the first municipality in the United States to achieve nationally accredited police, fire, and public works departments, and a Class-1 fire department, per the Insurance Services Office (ISO) ratings. Likewise, in 2003 Money magazine named Skokie one of the 80 fastest-growing suburbs in the U.S.

Besides strong manufacturing and retail commerce bases, Skokie's economy will add health sciences jobs; in 2003, Forest City Enterprises announced their re-development of the vacant Pfizer research laboratories, in downtown Skokie, as the Illinois Science + Technology Park, a 23-acre (93,000 m^{2}) campus of research installations—2 million square feet (190,000 m^{2}) of chemistry, genomics, toxicology laboratories, clean rooms, NMR suites, conference rooms, etc.). In 2006, NorthShore University HealthSystem announced installing their consolidated data center operations at the park, adding 500 jobs to the economy. Map maker Rand McNally is also headquartered in Skokie. More recently, the village has focused heavily on the revitalization of both the downtown and central business districts, incorporating Transit Oriented Development principles in the process.

=== Top employers ===
According to the Village's 2018 Comprehensive Annual Financial Report, the top employers in the village are:

| # | Employer | # of Employees |
|---|---|---|
| 1 | NorthShore University HealthSystem | 2,410 |
| 2 | Federal-Mogul | 1,279 |
| 3 | Niles Township High School District 219 | 950 |
| 4 | Macy's | 910 |
| 5 | Georgia Nut Company | 815 |
| 6 | Nordstrom | 618 |
| 7 | Village of Skokie | 498 |
| 8 | Illinois Circuit Court of Cook County | 465 |
| 9 | Skokie Park District | 432 |
| 10 | Generation Brands | 417 |

=== Notable corporations ===
- Peapod, online grocer
- FelPro, now Tenneco
- Mayfair Games
- Rand McNally
- USRobotics
- Bell & Howell
- G.D. Searle, now Pfizer

== Arts and culture ==
Westfield Old Orchard, an upscale shopping center, is one of the country's first and is the third largest mall by total square footage in Illinois.

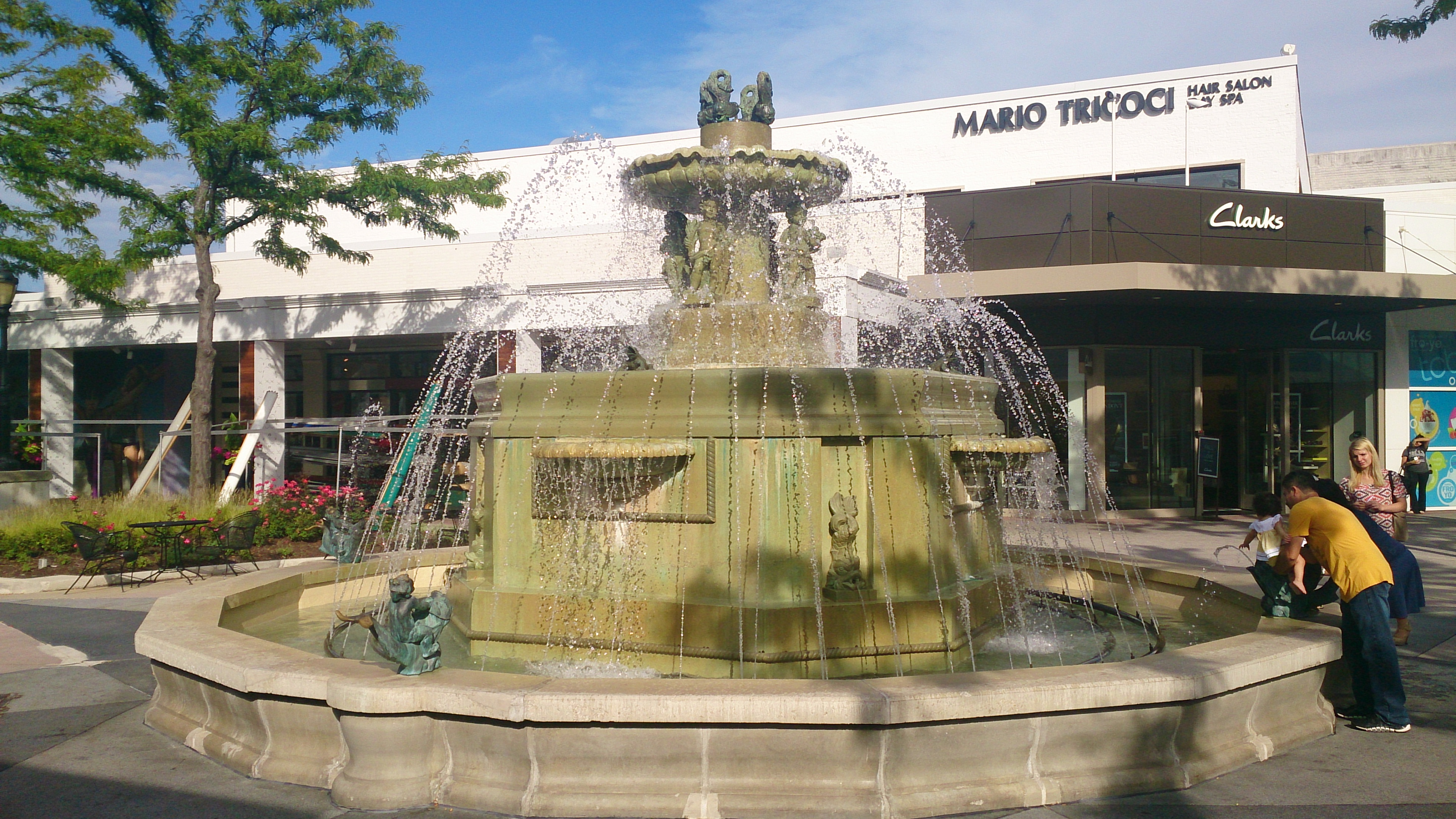
Fountain at Westfield Old Orchard

The Skokie Northshore Sculpture Park is situated along the North Shore Channel between Dempster Street and Touhy Avenue on the east side of McCormick Boulevard. The first sculptures were built in the park in 1988 and it now has over 70 sculptures. Three areas are toured May through October of each year, on the last Sunday of the month with a presentation by a docent. Just north of the sculpture garden is a statue to Mahatma Gandhi with five of his famous quotations engraved around the base. This was dedicated on October 2, 2004.

In addition to municipally-managed public spaces, the village is also home to the North Shore Center for the Performing Arts, encompassing Centre East, Northlight Theatre and the Skokie Valley Symphony Orchestra. The facility celebrated its 20th anniversary in 2016.

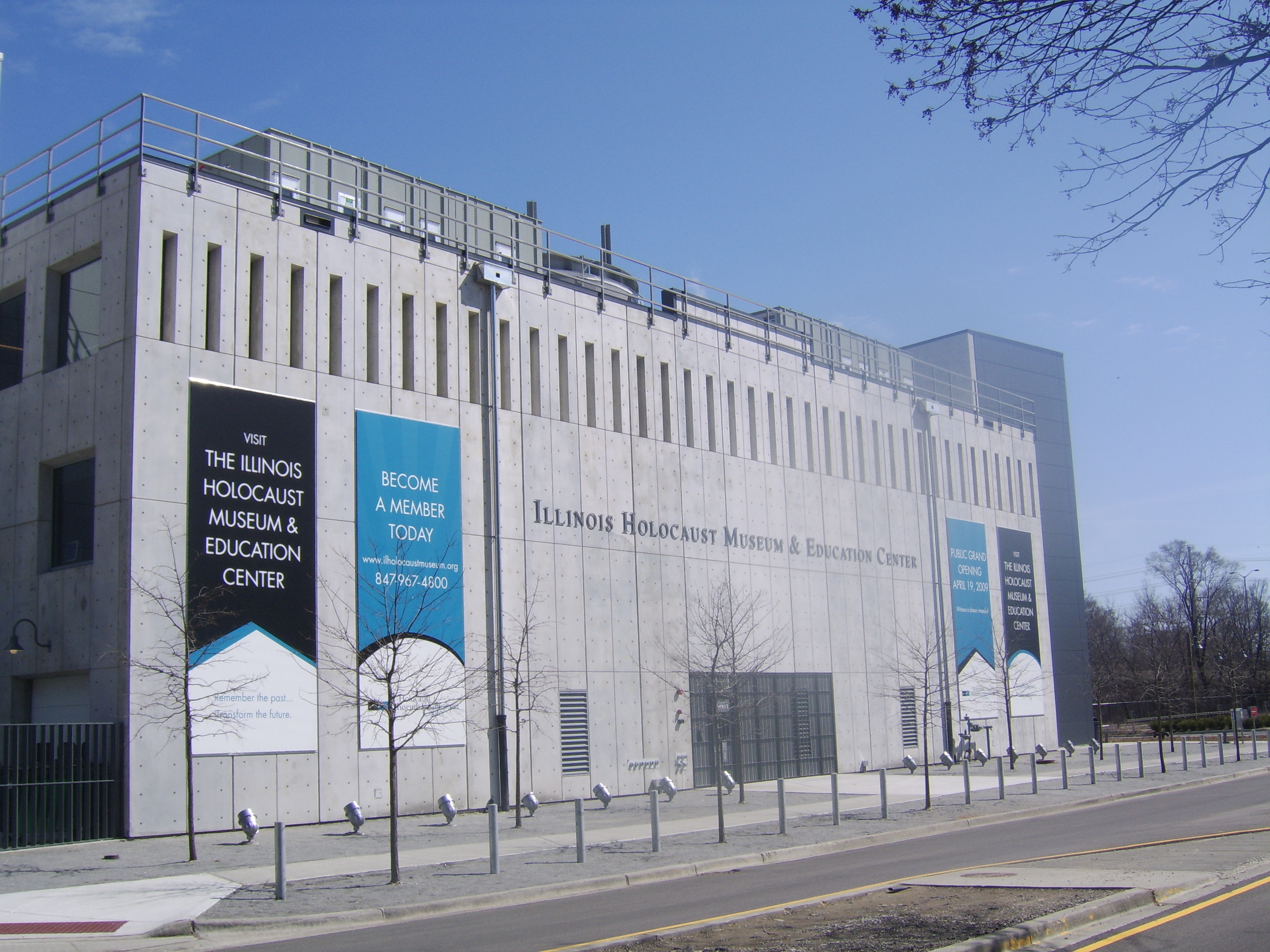
The Illinois Holocaust Museum and Education Center in Skokie

The Illinois Holocaust Museum and Education Center opened in Skokie on April 19, 2009.

Skokie's founding and early days were the subject of the 2023 documentary, Holy Ground.

=== Library ===
On October 7, 2008, the Skokie Public Library received the 2008 National Medal for Museum and Library Service, notably for its cultural programming and multilingual services.

== Parks and recreation ==
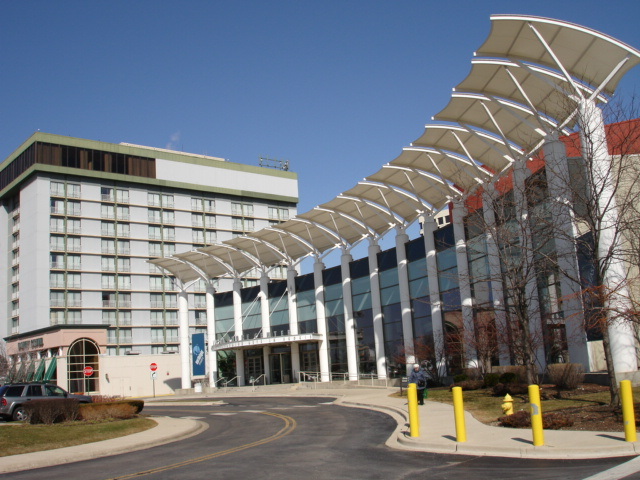
North Shore Center for Performing Arts in Skokie

The Skokie Park District maintains public spaces and historical sites within its more than 240 acres (0.97 km^{2}) of parkland and in its ten facilities.

The Skokie Valley Trail is a multi-use trail connecting the northwest side of Chicago to the communities of Lincolnwood and Skokie. In 2023, the Village announced plans to extend the Valley Line Trail from its current terminus at Dempster-Skokie Station to its northernmost boundary at Old Orchard Road. The result will be a continuous trail from the City of Chicago to the northern suburbs beyond Skokie. The project is estimated to be completed by 2025.

The North Shore Channel Trail also passes through the town, along its border with Evanston.

== Education ==
=== Public schools ===
Primary school districts include:

- Skokie School District 68
- Skokie/Morton Grove School District 69
- Fairview South School District 72
- East Prairie School District 73
- Skokie School District 73.5

Niles Township High School District 219 operates public high schools.

A portion of the city is served by the Evanston/Skokie School District 65 and Evanston Township High School.

==== High schools ====
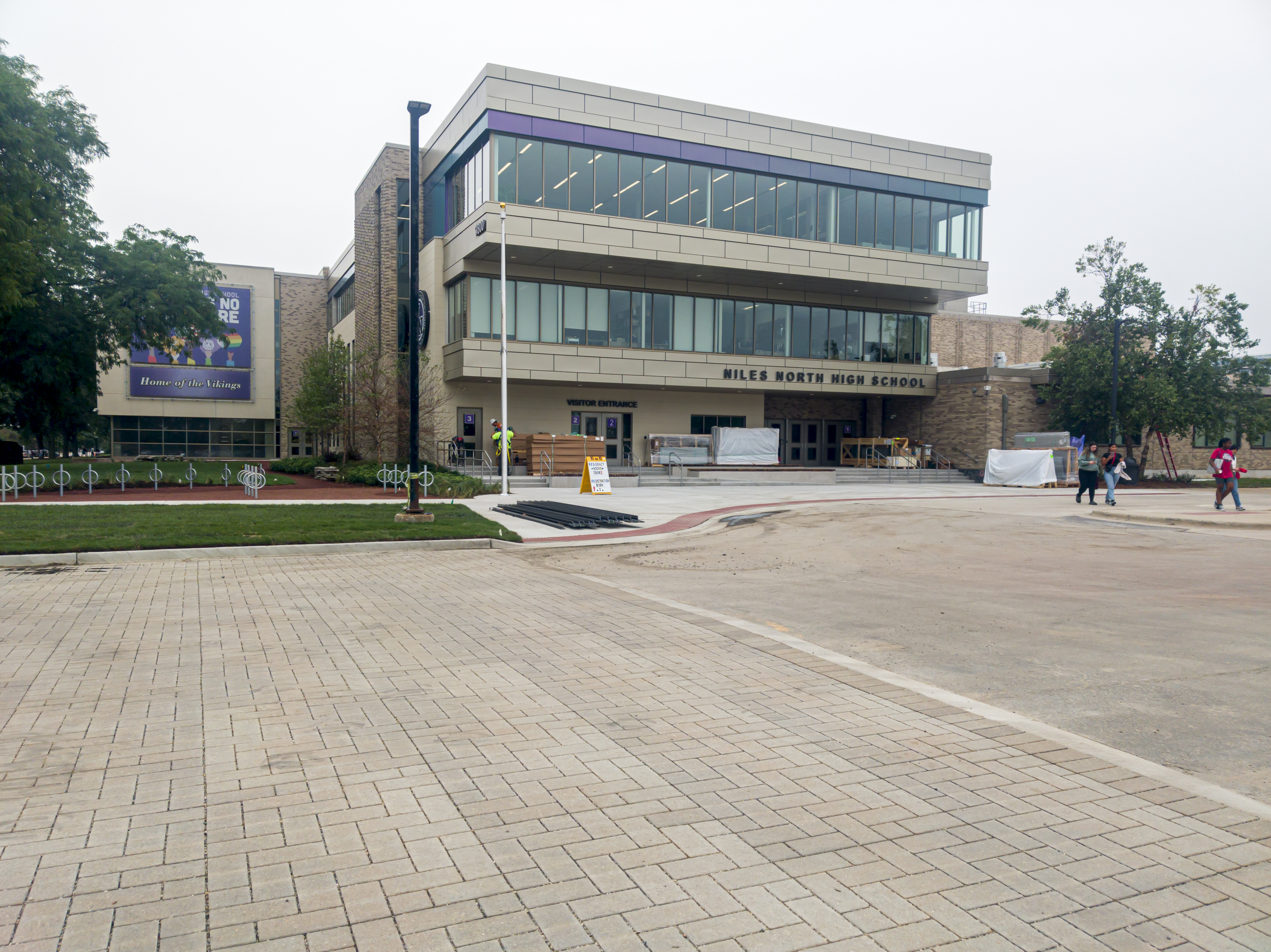
Niles North High School in Skokie

- Niles North of District 219
- Niles West of District 219
- Niles Township District 219, known for its fine arts program, was awarded the Kennedy Center for Performing Arts Top program for fine arts education in the United States on April 27, 2007.
- Niles East High School closed in 1980 after community efforts to save the school failed.

==== Junior high schools ====
- Oliver McCracken Middle School (formerly Oakview Junior High) of District 73.5
- East Prairie School (Pre-K through 8th) of District 73
- Fairview South School of District 72
- Lincoln Junior High of District 69
- Old Orchard Junior High of District 68
- Chute Middle School in Evanston serves a small portion of Skokie residents of Evanston/Skokie District 65

==== Elementary schools ====
See the same map as middle schools.

- Jane Stenson School, (K through 5th) of District 68
- Devonshire School, (K through 5th) of District 68
- Highland School, (K through 5th) of District 68
- Madison School, (pre-K through 2nd) of District 69
- Edison School, (3rd through 5th) of District 69
- Fairview North formerly of District 72
- Fairview South School, (K through 8th) of District 72
- Elizabeth Meyer School, (pre-K and K) of District 73.5
- John Middleton School, (1st through 5th) of District 73.5
- East Prairie School, (Pre-K through 8th) of District 73
- Walker Elementary School, (K through 5th) of Skokie/Evanston District 65
- Dr. Bessie Rhodes Magnet School, (K through 8th) of Skokie/Evanston District 65, formerly Timber Ridge Magnet School (may be attended by Skokie students in District 65)

=== Religious day schools ===
Jewish:

- Arie Crown Hebrew Day School (pre-K through 8th), boys and girls
- Cheder Lubavitch Hebrew Day School (pre-K through 8th), separate boys and girls programs
- Hillel Torah North Suburban Day School (pre-K through 8th), boys and girls
- Ida Crown Jewish Academy (9th through 12th), boys and girls
- Fasman Yeshiva High School (9th through 12th), boys only
- Solomon Schechter Day School Ginsburg Early Childhood Center. From 1978 to 2012 the day school had a campus in Skokie. After 2012 day students were moved to Northbrook, and the building is now MCC Academy's elementary school. The closure of the Skokie facility occurred as fewer Jewish people lived in Skokie.

Muslim:

- MCC Academy (Pre-K through elementary are in Skokie, with secondary students in Morton Grove)

Roman Catholic:

- St. Joan of Arc School (K-8), of the Roman Catholic Archdiocese of Chicago

=== Post-secondary education ===
- Oakton College (Ray Hartstein Campus) This is the site of the old Niles East High School. The original structure, built in the 1930s, was demolished in the 1990s.
- Hebrew Theological College, a private university. It was chartered in 1922 as one of the first Modern Orthodox Jewish institutions of higher education in America.
- National-Louis University has a campus near the Skokie Courthouse.
- Orchard Academy a postsecondary school for transition students graduating at age 22.

== Infrastructure ==
=== Public transportation ===
The Chicago "L"s Yellow Line terminates at the Dempster Street station in Skokie. Construction has been completed on a new Yellow Line train station at Oakton Street, to serve downtown Skokie. It opened on April 30, 2012. Additionally, the CTA is commissioning an alternatives analysis study on the extension of the Yellow Line terminal to Old Orchard Road for Federal Transit Administration New Start grants. The New Starts program allows federal funds to be used for capital projects provided that all extensions for a given problem (i.e., enabling easy transportation for reverse commuters to Westfield Old Orchard) are considered. The extension recommended by the CTA, is the elevation of the Yellow Line to a new terminal south of Old Orchard Road. This extension was canceled.

Although the Yellow Line is the fastest transportation to and from the city, the village also is served by CTA and Pace bus routes. The Pace Pulse Dempster Line opened through the village in 2023, which provides a high-frequency limited stop bus service between O'Hare Airport and the city of Evanston with sheltered stops adjacent to the Yellow Line. However, Greyhound Bus service to the Dempster Street train station has been discontinued. For automobile transport, Interstate 94, the Edens Expressway, traverses western Skokie, with interchanges at Touhy Avenue, Dempster Street, and Old Orchard Road.

=== Major highways ===
Major highways in Skokie include:

Interstate Highways

- Interstate 94

US Highways

- US 41

Illinois Highways

- Route 50
- Route 58

== Notable people ==
- Rob Ambrose, former head coach of Towson Tigers football team of Towson University
- Bushra Amiwala, first Gen Z elected official in the United States
- Louie Belpedio, NHL player for the Washington Capitals
- Mike Byster, mathematician, mental calculator and math educator
- Jovita Carranza (born 1949), 26th Administrator of the Small Business Administration (2020–2021). She is a past resident of Skokie.
- Bobby Ciraldo, filmmaker and web-based artist
- Bart Conner, Olympic gymnast, 1984 gold medalist
- David Cromer, theatre director and stage actor
- David Draiman, lead singer of Disturbed
- Robert Feder, media blogger, former columnist for Chicago Sun-Times
- Brenda A. Ferber, author of children's literature
- Ken Goldstein, singer and author
- Woody Goss, musician
- Joel Pollak, politician and journalist
- Nancy Lee Grahn, actress
- Phil Handler (1908–1968), NFL football player and coach
- Jim Hart, NFL Quarterback
- Erin Heatherton, fashion model and actress
- Amanda Jones, 1973 Miss USA
- Shelly Kagan, philosopher
- David Kaplan, columnist, radio and television personality
- Jonathan Kite, actor and comedian
- George Kotsiopoulos, magazine editor, fashion consultant, TV personality
- Ken Kramer, former Congressman
- Lou Lang, politician
- Rashard Mendenhall, former running back in the National Football League
- Abdel Nader (born 1993), professional basketball player for the Oklahoma City Thunder of the National Basketball Association
- Brent Novoselsky, NFL tight end
- Noam Pikelny, banjo player, known for association with string quintet Punch Brothers
- Larsa Pippen, television personality in The Real Housewives of Miami
- Esther Povitsky, standup comedian, actress and podcast host
- Matt Reichel, politician
- Eric Rosen (born 1993), chess player and Twitch streamer
- Clarke Rosenberg (born 1993), American-Israeli basketball player in the Israel Basketball Premier League
- Jessy Schram, actress
- John Gideon Searle, businessman
- Randy Suess, co-founder of CBBS, the first Bulletin Board System (BBS) ever brought online
- Calvin Sutker, politician and lawyer
- Azhar Usman, standup comedian, actor, writer, and producer.
- Wesley Willis, visual artist and musician
