= Marengo-Union Elementary School District 165 =

School district in Illinois, United States

Address
- 816 East Grant Highway Marengo, McHenry County, Illinois, 60152; United States

District information
- Grades: Pre-K to 8
- Superintendent: Mrs.Lea Damisch
- Schools: 3
- NCES District ID: 1700077

Students and staff
- Students: 1,102
- Teachers: 63

Other information
- Website: www.marengo165.org

Marengo-Union Elementary School District 165 is a school district in Marengo, Illinois. It provides public education to children in Marengo and Union, Illinois from pre-kindergarten through eighth grade.

== History ==
District 165 emerged from the consolidation of three local school districts: Union Consolidated School District 8, Hawthorn Community Consolidated District 7, and Marengo Consolidated District 140. In 1986, the three districts voted to consolidate, citing collective low enrollment and incentives presented by the 1985 Illinois School Reorganization Act as grounds to support their action.

Citizens from the area were appointed to a committee to discuss the reorganization of five school districts. Of the five, only Districts 8, 7, and 140 chose to unite into one district. This single district was found to be the most efficient choice for the area's school system. However, Riley School District 18 and Marengo High School District 154 opted to remain independent.

The district number, 165, was chosen for being the sum of the three district numbers that are included in it: 8, 7, and 140.

== Schools ==
- Locust Elementary School
- Ulysses S. Grant Intermediate School
- Marengo Community Middle School
