= Burnham SD =

School district in Illinois, United States

Burnham School District 154.5
- 13945 Green Bay Avenue Burnham, Illinois, 60633

District information
- Type: Public
- Grades: PreK--8
- NCES District ID: 1707860

Students and staff
- Students: 141
- Faculty: 10

Other information
- Website: https://www.d1545.org/

Burnham Elementary School District 154-5 is a public school district located in Burnham, Illinois, a small suburb adjacently south of Chicago.

The district serves the village of Burnham and consists of single K-8 school; the school and the district are located at the same address.
