= Glencoe School District 35 =

School district in Illinois, United States

Location
- 620 Greenwood Avenue Glencoe, Illinois, 60022; United States

District information
- NCES District ID: 3630270

Students and staff
- Students: 1,220 (2020–2021)
- Teachers: 103.90 (on an FTE basis)(2020–2021)
- Student–teacher ratio: 11.74:1 (2020–2021)

Other information
- Website: www.glencoeschools.org

Glencoe School District 35 is a public school district in Glencoe, Illinois. Serving kindergarten through grade 8, the district is made up of 3 schools: South School, West School, and Central School.
