= Arbor Park School District 145 =

School district in Illinois, United States

- 17301 Central Ave Oak Forest, Illinois, 60452

District information
- Type: Public
- Grades: PreK–8
- NCES District ID: 1703930

Students and staff
- Students: 1,155

Other information
- Website: arbor145.org

Arbor Park School District 145 is a school district headquartered in Oak Forest, Illinois in Greater Chicago. It serves Oak Forest and Tinley Park.

== Schools ==
Lower secondary:

- Arbor Park Middle School

Primary:

- Kimberly Heights School
- Morton Gingerwood School
- Scarlet Oak School

Other:

- Kids Club Child Care Program

== Notable people ==
- Lee Martin, Pulitzer Prize Finalist author of The Bright Forever. He attended Kimberly Heights Elementary and Arbor Park Middle School from 1963 until 1969
