= South Holland School District 151 =

School district in Illinois, United States

Address
- 525 East 162nd Street South Holland, Illinois, 60473; United States

District information
- Type: Public
- Grades: PreK–8
- NCES District ID: 1736750

Students and staff
- Students: 1,593

Other information
- Website: www.shsd151.org

South Holland School District 151 is an elementary school district in South Holland, a Chicago suburb located in southern Cook County, Illinois. It is composed of four schools; three elementary schools and one junior high school. Students begin their education in the district at Taft School; prekindergarteners, kindergarteners, and first graders are educated here under supervision of principal Christine Wilson. Students then proceed to Eisenhower School, where they will remain until third grade; the school's principal is Mr. Peter Kolinski. The third and final elementary school in the district educates fourth and fifth graders, and is called Madison School; Madison's principal is Dr. Jerald McNair. Graduates of Madison move on to Coolidge Middle School, where they will remain until graduating from the eighth grade. The principal of the district's middle school is Chevia Rush.
