= Homewood School District 153 =

School district in Illinois, United States

Address
- 18205 Aberdeen Street Homewood, Illinois, 60430; United States

District information
- Type: Public
- Grades: PreK–8
- NCES District ID: 1719530

Students and staff
- Students: 1,893

Other information
- Website: www.hsd153.org

Homewood School District 153 is a school district headquartered inside James Hart Middle School in Homewood, Illinois in the Chicago metropolitan area.

Homewood-Flossmoor High School is separate, controlled by its own school district.

== Schools ==
- Willow School (early childhood-grade 2)
- Winston Churchill School (grades 3–5)
- James Hart Middle School (grades 6–8)
