= South Holland School District 150 =

School district in Illinois, United States

Address
- 848 East 170th Street South Holland, Illinois, 60473; United States

District information
- Type: Public
- Grades: PreK–8
- NCES District ID: 1736720

Students and staff
- Students: 868

Other information
- Website: www.sd150.org

South Holland School District 150 is an elementary school district in South Holland, a village located in Cook County just south of the city of Chicago. It is composed of three schools: two elementary schools and one junior high school; all three schools are located within South Holland, although the junior high school and one of the elementary school are located in the same facility. Students begin their education as prekindergarteners or kindergarteners in Greenwood Elementary School, where under supervision of principal William Kolloway, students will remain until graduating from grade three. Students then progress to McKinley Elementary School under principal jerome Pharrel where students in grades four and five are educated. The last wing of education that the district provides takes place in McKinley Junior High School, which is in the same structure as McKinley Elementary School; it is also headed by Jerome Pharrel, and serves grades six through eight. Dr. Jerry Jordan is the superintendent of the district.
