= Sunnybrook School District 171 =

School district in Illinois, United States

Address
- 19266 Burnham Avenue Lansing, Illinois, 60438; United States

District information
- Type: Public
- Grades: PreK–8
- NCES District ID: 1738370

Students and staff
- Students: 954

Other information
- Website: www.sd171.org

Sunnybrook School District 171 is a school in the village of Lansing, Cook County, Illinois. It is a suburb of Chicago, and is located due south of the city proper. Sunnybrook School District 171 is composed of two schools: one elementary school and one middle school. Students that are enrolled in this district begin their education in Nathan Hale Elementary School, where under direction of principal Joseph Kent, students that are in prekindergarten, kindergarten, or in grades one through four are educated. Students between grades five and eight attend Heritage Middle School, which is headed by principal Chantelle Cambric and whose mascot is the eagle. District 171's superintendent is Dr. Erika Millhouse-Pettis.
