= Palos Heights School District 128 =

School district in Illinois, United States

Address
- 12809 South McVickers Avenue Palos Heights, Illinois, 60463; United States

District information
- Type: Public
- Grades: PreK–8
- NCES District ID: 1730570

Students and staff
- Students: 730 (2020–2021)

Other information
- Website: www.d128.k12.il.us

Palos Heights School District 128 is a PK-8 Cook County, Illinois, school district in the southern village of Palos Heights; the district serves Palos Heights Proper and the majority of its neighboring unincorporated areas. The district has four schools: Indian Hill Preschool, which educates prekindergarteners, serves roughly 7% of district students; Cathy Leslie is the director of the prekindergarten program at the facility. Chippewa Elementary School, the most populous of the schools as of May 2008, educates District 128 students in grades one through three, and also runs a kindergarten program; it is under the direction of Mary Ann Redshaw. Those in grades four through five attend Navajo Heights Elementary School, which bridges the gap between the elementary schools and the grades 6–8 Independence Junior High School; the principal of Navajo Heights Elementary School is Sharon Herman, while the principal of Independence Junior High School is Dr. Kevin Kirk. The district superintendent is Dr. Kathleen Casey, and the mascot of Independence Junior High School is the patriot.

The administration of Independence Junior High School runs a program linked to its home page; this program is a page-long short story known as a "Five Minute Mystery" that students are meant to solve in an attempt to encourage students to read more.

Navajo Heights hosts a series of activities, including book clubs, a math team alternatively known as a Math Olympiad, a chorus, and a community service committee. Additionally, the school presents the products of project assignments from the students of the two grades of which it serves.

Independence and Navajo Heights sport school bands.
