= Thornton School District 154 =

School district in Illinois, United States

Address
- 200 North Wolcott Street Thornton, Illinois, 60476; United States

District information
- Type: Public
- Grades: K–8
- NCES District ID: 1738910

Students and staff
- Students: 236

Other information
- Website: www.d154.org

Thornton School District 154, also referred to as Cook County School District 154, is an elementary school district based in the village of Thornton, Cook County, Illinois, and is a suburb of Chicago located south of the city proper. The district is composed of a single school, which covers grades one through eight in addition to kindergarten and prekindergarten programs. The institution is called Wolcott School. Thornton School District's superintendent is Dr. Carol Kunst.
