= Forest Ridge School District 142 =

School district in Illinois, United States

Address
- 5800 151st Street Oak Forest, Illinois, 60452; United States

District information
- Type: Public
- Grades: PreK–8
- NCES District ID: 1715480

Students and staff
- Students: 1,550

Other information
- Website: www.d142.org

Forest Ridge School District 142 is a school district headquartered in Oak Forest, Illinois in Greater Chicago.

== Schools ==
- Jack Hille Middle School
- Lee R. Foster Elementary School
- G. Kerkstra Elementary School
- Ridge Early Childhood Center
