= Sandridge School District 172 =

School district in Illinois, United States

Address
- 2950 Glenwood Dyer Road Lynwood, Illinois, 60411; United States

District information
- Type: Public
- Grades: K–8
- NCES District ID: 1735340

Students and staff
- Students: 432

Other information
- Website: www.sandridgesd172.net

Sandridge School District 172 is an elementary school district based in the unincorporated southern Chicago suburb of Chicago Heights, Illinois on the Cook County side of boundaries with Will County, Illinois and Lake County, Indiana; Sandridge School District serves students in Chicago Heights and the surrounding communities of Lynwood and Sauk Village. The district is composed of a single facility that handles all students below and including those in grade eight. This school, known as Sandridge Elementary School. The school and district were named for the geography of the school when it was initially constructed, as it was built upon a sandy ridge.

== History ==
Sandridge School was founded in a previously rural area in 1863; the original school cost $82.50 and required a year of construction. The school gradually expanded from that point; a two-room schoolhouse replaced the original schoolhouse in 1925, and that schoolhouse replaced by another schoolhouse that was twice its size. The district could not keep up with the growing student body population, and seventh and eighth graders had to attend school in nearby Glenwood. In 1994, the school began to crowd again, and expansion became a necessity; in the next fourteen years, Sandridge added a gymnasium, a cafeteria, and up to ten additional classrooms; in 2008, a computer lab was opened in the district as well. As of 2008, the district was working on expanding extracurricular activity options and facilitating travel to and from the school. In 2013 a Science Lab was installed for Junior High students. On January 24, 2023, Sandridge Elementary was unanimously annexed into the City of Lynwood, making a historical move since its creation in 1863.
