= Schiller Park School District 81 =

School district in Illinois, United States

Address
- 9760 Soreng Avenue Schiller Park, Illinois, 60176; United States

District information
- Type: Public
- Grades: PreK–8
- NCES District ID: 1735640

Students and staff
- Students: 1,377

Other information
- Website: www.sd81.org

Schiller Park School District 81 is a school district headquartered in Schiller Park, Illinois.

In addition to Schiller Park its territory includes a section of Franklin Park.

It has three schools, all in Schiller Park: Kennedy Elementary, Washington Elementary, and Lincoln Middle School.
