= West Harvey-Dixmoor Public School District 147 =

Public school district in Illinois, US

Address
- 191 West 155th Place Harvey, Illinois, 60426; United States

District information
- Type: Public
- Grades: PreK–8
- NCES District ID: 1718480

Students and staff
- Students: 831

Other information
- Website: www.whd147.org

West Harvey-Dixmoor Public School District 147 is an elementary school district based in the southern suburban Chicago city of Harvey, Cook County, Illinois. The district is composed of four schools: three are elementary schools and one is a middle school, where all schools are located in the adjacent village of Dixmoor with the exception of one elementary school located in Harvey. District students in living in Harvey that are in prekindergarten, kindergarten, or grades one through five attend Washington Elementary School which is directed by the principal, Dr. Earnest Taylor. Students of the same grades living in Dixmoor attend either Lincoln Elementary School or King Elementary School. The principals of the schools are, respectively, Dr. Gregory Jackson and Sandra Wells. All elementary schools feed into Rosa L. Parks Middle School, which is headed by principal Abigail Phillips. The school district's superintendent is Dr. Alex Boyd, Jr.

Each school has a mascot. The mascot of King Elementary and Parks Middle Schools is the cougar, while Lincoln's mascot is the wildcat and Washington's is the eagle.
