= Western Springs School District 101 =

School district in Illinois, United States

- 4225 Wolf Road Western Springs, Illinois, 60558

District information
- Type: Public
- Grades: Pre-K through 8
- Superintendent: Sarah Coffey
- School board: 7 members
- Schools: Elementary 3, Middle 1
- NCES District ID: 1741820

Students and staff
- Students: 1466 (2022-2023)
- Student–teacher ratio: 11.71:1

Western Springs School District 101 is an elementary school district located in the affluent central Cook County village of Western Springs, Illinois.

The district is composed of four schools: three elementary and one is a junior high school, and all four are located in the village of Western Springs. Students may begin their education as prekindergarteners in John Laidlaw, Forest Hills, or Field Park Elementary School, where they will remain until grade five. All elementary schools feed into McClure Junior High School, where they will remain from grades 6-8. The superintendent of the district is Dr. Sarah Coffey, while Ashley Burger, the former Principal of Field Park Elementary, was promoted to the role of Assistant Superintendent of Curriculum and Instruction in 2024.

According to the Illinois Report Card, the schools within the district range from commendable to exemplary, the two highest categories. Compared to the rest of the state, the district performs roughly 2.5x better on ELA and Math, while performing 1.7x better in Science. The district spends roughly $14,000 per student, with total expenditures exceeding $23 million.

== History ==
Western Springs School District 101 was officially formed on August 6, 1888, with the opening of Grand Avenue School. The school initially served grades K-4, before the students moved to Laidlaw Elementary School upon the closing of Grand Avenue in 1981. In 2014, the district

=== McClure History ===
Wolf Road School was opened on June 13, 1924, being the oldest school still open within the district. An addition to the school was added in 1928. On April 29, 1935, the school board voted unanimously to rename the Wolf Road School to McClure Junior High, in honor of E.P. McClure, who served as the president of the Board and donated the land upon which the school is located. In 1961, an addition and renovation to the school included music, home economics, and industrial arts classes. In 1998,

== Demographics ==
In the 2022-2023 school year, there were 1,466 students enrolled in the district. 88.7% of the students were non-Hispanic white, 6.5% were Hispanic or Latino, 3.5% were multiracial, 0.3% were black or African-American, and 1% were Asian-American. The district has a student to teacher ratio of 11.71:1.

== School leadership ==
Each elementary schools’ building administration (with the exception of Laidlaw), is led solely by a principal. Laidlaw Elementary and McClure Junior High includes the addition of an Assistant Principal at each campus that works alongside their Principal. The Principal of John Laidlaw Elementary School is Renee Epstein, with Carolyn Dolan assisting as the schools Assistant Principal. Rachel Corrough serves as the Principal of Forest Hills Elementary and Emily Kruzel leads Field Park Elementary. After students finish their education at one of the elementary schools, they will be sent to McClure Junior High and be educated under the direction of Laura Broadnax, with Thomas Sturm as the Assistant Principal.

== Board of Education ==
The Board of Education is the districts primary governing body. The Board consists of seven members, who are individually elected by residents of the District. Members are elected at the consolidated election, which is held every two years on the first Tuesday of April.

=== Membership ===
Caitlin Sendaydiego is currently serving as the President of the Board of Education, and has been president since 2021. She was first elected in April 2017, and won re-election in 2021. Brett Lettiere, who has been Vice President of the board since 2021, was also elected in April 2017 and re-elected in 2021. Meredith Adler and Meghan Cahill were elected to the board in April 2019 and won re-election in 2023, with Kate Heit, Catherine Dudley, and Dan Pansing being elected in April 2021.
