= Skokie School District 73½ =

Grade school district in Illinois, USA

Address
- 8000 East Prairie Road Skokie, Illinois, 60076; United States

District information
- Type: Public
- Grades: PreK–8
- NCES District ID: 1710380

Students and staff
- Students: 1,061

Other information
- Website: www.sd735.org

Skokie School District 73½ is a grade school district in east central Skokie, Cook County, Illinois.

School District 73½ was created on August 15, 1930, from part of School District 73, giving 42% of the school funds to District 73½. District 73½ immediately arranged for its children to attend school in District 69 with District 73½ paying tuition of $100.00 per student per year. District 73½ then built a new school, the Cleveland Public School, dedicating it on November 24, 1931. Cleveland School closed by 1986. Cleveland School closed after the 1976–1977 school year.

Oakview Junior High School, at 8000 East Prairie Road at the corner with Oakton Street, was dedicated on November 15, 1959. It was renamed "Oliver McCracken Middle School", after the retiring district superintendent, on March 23, 1987.

The school at 8100 North Tripp Avenue at the corner with Keeney Street, opened in 1994, and was unofficially called simply "Tripp School" until it received the formal name "Elizabeth Meyer School", after an early pioneer, on May 26, 1999.

== Schools ==
- Oliver McCracken Middle School (grades 6–8)
- John Middleton Elementary School (grades 1–5)
- Elizabeth Meyer School (preschool-kindergarten)

== See also ==
- Niles Township High School District 219
