= Fairview South School District 72 =

School district in Skokie, Illinois, USA

Address
- 7040 Laramie Avenue Skokie, Cook County, Illinois, 60077; United States
- Coordinates: 42.009689°N,-87.758465°W

District information
- Type: Public
- Grades: Pre-K–8
- Superintendent: Dr. Cindy Whittaker
- Asst. superintendent(s): Jeff Feyerer
- NCES District ID: 1714820

Students and staff
- Students: ~792
- District mascot: Frank the Falcon (subject to change)
- Colors: Green, Black, White

Other information
- Website: www.fairview72.com

Fairview District 72 is a school district headquartered in Skokie, Illinois. It serves Preschool through 8th grade in a single facility. During 2022–2024, the school underwent heavy reconstruction to renovate the interior, parking lot and learning center (nicknamed the (Falcon's) Nest), resulting in a portion of Schack Park being torn down, and expansion of the parking lot.
