= Franklin Park School District 84 =

School district in Illinois, United States

Address
- 2915 Maple Street Franklin Park, Illinois, 60131; United States

District information
- Type: Public
- Grades: PreK–8
- NCES District ID: 1715780

Students and staff
- Students: 1,303

Other information
- Website: www.d84.org

Franklin Park School District 84 is a school district headquartered in Franklin Park, Illinois. The district operates five schools: North Elementary School, Lawrence W. Passow Elementary School, Dan H. Pietrini Elementary School, Vance C. Hester Junior High School and East Early Childhood Center.
