= East Prairie School District 73 =

School district in Illinois, United States

Address
- 7616 East Prairie Road Skokie, Illinois, 60076; United States

District information
- Type: Public
- Grades: PreK–8
- NCES District ID: 1713260

Students and staff
- Students: ~600

Other information
- Website: www.eps73.net

East Prairie School District 73 is an elementary school district located in the northern Cook County Chicago suburb of Skokie. The district is composed of a single facility, known as East Prairie Elementary School. East Prairie Elementary School educates all students in or below grade eight, and also runs a prekindergarten program. The district, in all, has 42 teachers: twelve of those teachers teach primary school students, eight of the teachers teach intermediate school students, another twelve teachers further the education of middle school students, nine teachers lead electives classes, and one last teacher educates the staff on various topics surrounding technology. Mike Stein, a middle school teacher at East Prairie School, was chosen by the Chicago Tribune in 2019 as person of the week.
