= Skokie School District 68 =

School district in Illinois, United States

Address
- 9440 Kenton Avenue Skokie, Illinois, 60076; United States

District information
- Type: Public
- Grades: PreK–8
- Established: 1898
- NCES District ID: 1736450

Students and staff
- Students: 1,741

Other information
- Website: www.skokie68.org

Skokie School District 68 is a school district headquartered in Skokie, Illinois. It serves northwestern sections of Skokie.

== History ==
School District 68 was established in 1898, a year after the completion of Sharp Corner School. A new Sharp Corner School was constructed and opened in 1929.

Sharp Corner School remained the districts sole school until the 1950s. Jane Stenson School was opened in 1954, Devonshire and Highland Schools were open by 1958, and Old Orchard Junior High School opened in 1960.

Sharp Corner School was closed in 1976, bringing the district down to the four schools it has today.

== Schools ==
Junior high school

- Old Orchard Junior High School

Elementary schools

- Devonshire Elementary School
- Highland Elementary School
- Jane Stenson Elementary School

Preschool

- Early Childhood Center
