= Northfield Township High School District 225 =

High school district in Cook County, Illinois

Address
- 3801 West Lake Avenue Glenview, Illinois, 60026; United States

District information
- Type: Public
- Grades: 9–12
- NCES District ID: 1729010

Students and staff
- Students: 5,092

Other information
- Website: www.glenbrook225.org

Northfield Township High School District 225, also called Glenbrook High Schools or Glenbrook High School District 225, is a high school district in Northfield Township, Cook County, Illinois, including most of the villages of Glenview and Northbrook, suburbs of Chicago. Golf and a small portion of western Northfield are also located within the high school district.

== Schools ==
- Glenbrook North High School in Northbrook, formerly known as Glenbrook High School (until 1962)
- Glenbrook South High School in Glenview
- Glenbrook Off-Campus, a special-needs school located in Glenview, located near Glenbrook South

== See also ==
- Northbrook School District 27
- Northbrook School District 28
- Northbrook/Glenview School District 30
- West Northfield School District 31
- Glenview Community Consolidated School District 34
