= WGBK =

Radio station in Northbrook and Glenview, Illinois

- Glenview, Cook County, Illinois; United States
- Broadcast area: Glenview and Northbrook Township
- Frequency: 88.5 MHz

Programming
- Format: Indie/College Music, News, Sports

Ownership
- Owner: Glenbrook High School District

History
- Former call signs: WMWA
- Call sign meaning: "Glenbrook"

Technical information
- Licensing authority: FCC
- Facility ID: 42125
- Class: A
- ERP: 185 watts
- HAAT: 32 meters (105 ft)
- Transmitter coordinates: 42°6′39.00″N 87°49′56.00″W

Links
- Public license information: Public file; LMS
- Website: Listen live

WGBK 88.5 FM is a non commercial radio station operated by the students and faculty advisers of Glenbrook South High School in Glenview, Cook County, Illinois and Glenbrook North High School in Northbrook, Illinois.

== History as WMWA ==
The station was originally owned and operated as WMWA by the Midwestern Academy, a Christian day school affiliated with the General Church of the New Jerusalem. The radio courses at Glenbrook South were started in 1981. Shortly thereafter, in 1982, the high school bought evening time on WMWA. In 1996, the high school district purchased the station and requested a call letter change (hence WGBK).

== Programming ==
WGBK currently serves Chicago's North Shore communities. WGBK programs popular music, covers local news, and broadcasts local high school sports. The high school radio station was founded and developed by Dell Kennedy who has retired from the teaching profession. In August 2004, the station began broadcasting 24 hours per day and streaming its broadcasts online. The station has been managed since the summer of 2004 by one of Dell Kennedy's former students, Dan Oswald, who was a student in the program from 1988 to 1992.

In 2004, the station received 2nd place in the John Drury High School Radio Awards, and has continued to be awarded for excellence in student broadcasting and production.
