= Glenbrook North High School =

Public high school in Northbrook, Illinois

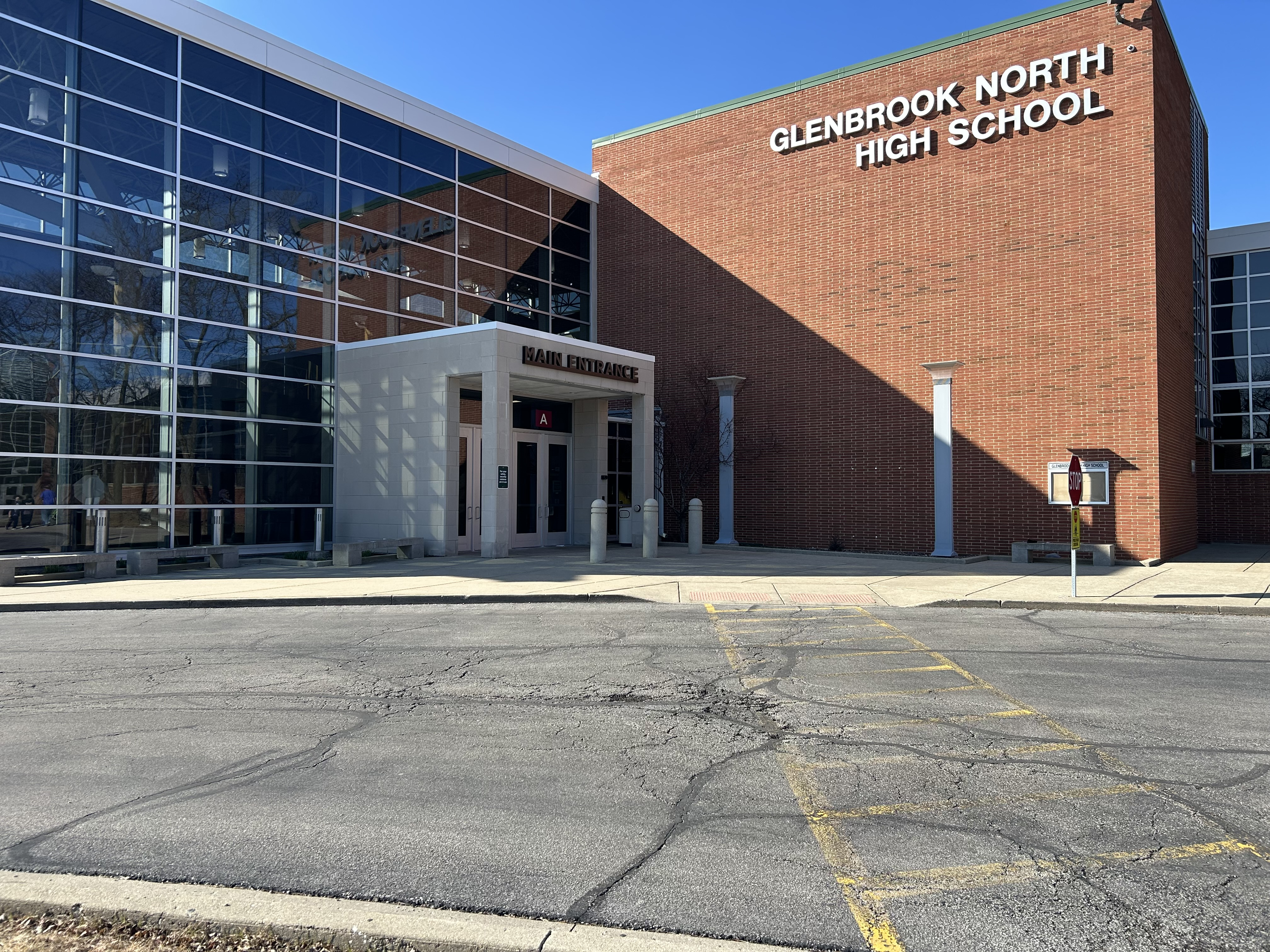
- Main Entrance of the School

Location
- 2300 Shermer Road; Northbrook, Illinois 60062; United States; 42.11133°N 87.83422°W

Information
- Other name: GBN
- Former name: Glenbrook High School
- Type: Public high school
- Established: 1953
- School district: Northfield Township High School District 225
- Superintendent: R.J. Gravel
- NCES School ID
- Principal: Mandy Hughes
- Teaching staff: 161.34 (on an FTE basis)
- Grades: 9–12
- Enrollment: 2,111 (2024-2025)
- Student to teacher ratio: 13.08
- Colors: Green and Gold
- Athletics conference: Central Suburban League
- Nickname: Spartans
- Newspaper: Torch
- Yearbook: Laconian
- Website: gbn.glenbrook225.org

Glenbrook North High School (also known as GBN) is a public high school in Northbrook, Illinois, a north suburb of Chicago, United States. It was established in 1953 and is part of the Northfield Township High School District 225.

In 2022, it was ranked the 48th-best public high school in the United States by Niche.

Feeder schools that attend GBN are Wood Oaks, Northbrook Junior High, Field (Northbrook portions), and Maple (Northbrook portions). GBN serves most of Northbrook, some unincorporated portions of Cook County, and a very small section of Glenview.

== History ==
In 1930, Northbrook opened Northbrook High School to serve its residents. But as Northbrook grew due to American suburbanization, more space to accommodate students was needed, warranting its closure and the construction of a new high school.

=== Founding ===
Glenbrook North High School opened its doors in the fall of 1953 as Glenbrook High School, with its name being a combination of "Northbrook" and "Glenview". After the opening of Glenbrook South High School in Glenview, the school was renamed to Glenbrook North. Subsequently, the two schools formed Glenbrook High School District 225.

Glenbrook North has grown fourfold in the size of its student body since its founding. In 1979, the school opened the Sheely Center for the Performing Arts, and in 1990, a fieldhouse was dedicated. In the spring of 1996, a three-year renovation and construction project involving the science facilities and the "A" wing was built. A second swimming pool was built in 2000 to accommodate the burgeoning growth in aquatics. A successful referendum in 2006 enabled renovation and addition to a second floor of the schools "F" wing, state of the art Fitness Center, complete renovation and additions to the Music Area, and a sun-filled main entrance, which were completed in 2009.

Throughout the years, Glenbrook North High School has received state and national recognition for its academic excellence. In the late 1950s, when Glenbrook was less than 10 years old, it was named one of the top 44 high schools in the country by a survey in a national magazine. In 1984, GBN was named one of only four high schools in the state of Illinois to receive the United States Office of Education Excellence in Education Award from President Ronald Reagan. In 2008, GBN was selected again for the nation's top distinction as a Blue Ribbon School.

=== John Hughes films ===
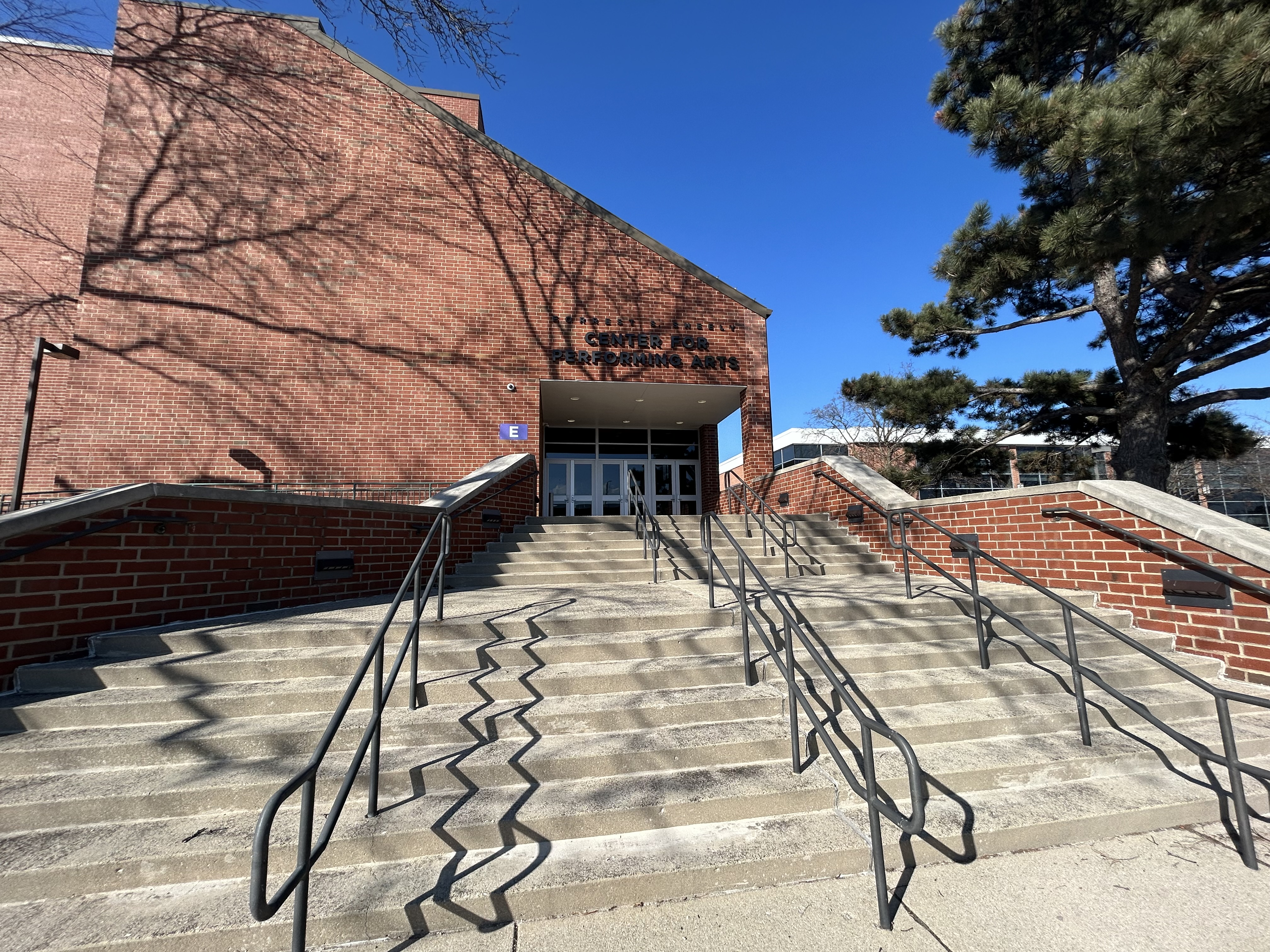
The stairs outside the Center for Performing Arts, used in Ferris Bueller's Day Off

John Hughes was an alumnus who used exteriors of the school in his film Ferris Bueller's Day Off. Hughes also used other schools throughout the north Chicago suburbs for his "Shermer, Illinois" locations. Hughes used interiors of the school in his film The Breakfast Club.

=== President Clinton visit ===
On January 22, 1997, President Bill Clinton visited the school to deliver a speech about education initiatives. It was held in the school's fieldhouse and largely centered around mathematics and science. At the time, students in Northern Illinois were participating in a program called "First in the World." The program was to judge the level of knowledge in math and science against other schools around the world. Northern Illinois students scored 1st in the Science category and 3rd in the Mathematics category. Remarking about Glenbrook High School District 225, President Clinton said:

Can you imagine a school district or a set of school districts with more genuine local control than this one, with—more than these— more parental involvement, more committed teachers, more—you know, you've got local control. But you didn't use it as an excuse not to throw your hat in the ring. I think it's great that it came out this way. But if you had finished eighth and ninth, I would still be here to pat you on the back because you had the guts to do it.

Less than a month later, Bill Clinton referenced his visit to the school and these achievements in his 1997 State of the Union on February 4, 1997.

=== Student hazing incident ===
In May 2003, the school gained notoriety after an off-campus, non-school-sanctioned event involving students dressed in school colors turned into a major hazing incident that attracted national media attention. The event was a "Powder Puff" girls' football game between members of the junior and senior classes. The "game" took place on May 4, 2003, in Chipilly Woods, part of the Cook County Forest Preserve District. Although the annual Powder Puff game had been held at the school's football stadium in earlier decades, there was no football at the 2003 event. During the event, about 20 junior class participants were covered in paint, urine, feces, and animal guts. Some were shot with paintball guns, others were kicked and beaten. At least five participants sustained injuries requiring medical attention.

Thirty-one students – twenty-eight females and three males – were suspended from school for 10 days. They were later expelled. Some of the expelled students and their parents filed a lawsuit to allow the expelled students to graduate. The plaintiffs and the school district reached an agreement where the expelled students would have their diplomas mailed to them but would not be able to participate in graduation ceremonies. Local law enforcement authorities investigated the hazing incident and filed charges against 15 students for assault and battery. Two mothers were charged with providing alcohol for the event. All were convicted and the sentences received were light, ranging from probation to community service.

A community-wide task force was established by the Northbrook Police Department Community Services Division after the hazing incident. Their final report stressed the needs for recognizing and preventing hazing incidents.

== Campus ==
Glenbrook North is located at 2300 Shermer Road adjacent to Maple School. Glenbrook North is home to the Forrest S. Sheely Center for the Performing Arts (where the Northbrook Symphony performs) and has an additional "little theater" located in the schools basement. Within the athletics wing exists multiple pools, several gyms including a climbing and gymnastics gym, a fieldhouse, a fitness center, and outdoor tennis courts, fields (including for football), and tracks. There are two cafeterias; one for students and one for staff. Weather permitting, the central courtyard is open during lunch. At the back of the property is a 1.5 acre prairie.

== Diversity ==
For the 2021 school year, 71.4% of students were White, 0.5% were Black, 5.4% were Hispanic, 17.9% were Asian, 0% were Native American, 0.1% were Pacific Islander, and 4.8% were of two or more races. The school also has a large Jewish population.

The school offers a variety of programs catering to students' heritage. For example, its language program includes less commonly taught languages such as Russian and Mandarin Chinese. Owing to the North Shore (Chicago)'s large Jewish population (see History of the Jews in Chicago), Hebrew was introduced in 2010 and an Israeli Culture Club was created. Other culture-focused clubs are Black Student Union, Foreign Films Club, Hellenic Club, and Pan-Asian Student Society. Gender Sexuality Alliance (GSA) serves Glenbrook North's LGBT population. There is also a feminist club.

== Academics ==
SAT Scores for Glenbrook North High School
School Year	SAT ELA	SAT Math	SAT Mean
2021-2022	577.5	586	1177

The academic school year consists of 37 weeks divided into two semesters. It has a block schedule with classes meeting on alternating days and each school day consists of four blocks of 90 minutes each. The summer school program is six weeks in length.

Honors level courses are offered to qualified students. Advanced Placement (AP) courses are available in a range of topics including English, history, math, science, art, music, computer science, and world languages.

In 2021, the school graduated 96% of its senior class, and 98% enrolled in college. The 2021 class included 14 National Merit Semifinalists and 176 Illinois State Scholars. The student-to-teacher ratio is 11.54 to 1.

In 2022, it was ranked the 48th best public high school in the United States by Niche. In 2016, it was ranked 23rd on the public high schools with the best teachers in America by Business Insider.

=== Debate ===
The school's debate team was ranked the top debate school of the 20th century based on performance in the National Speech and Debate Association. The school has won numerous state and national championships in Policy Debate, as well as state championships in Lincoln-Douglas and Public Forum Debate. It is the only high school debate program in the country to have ever won the debate's "Triple Crown," sweeping the National Speech and Debate Association Tournament, the Tournament of Champions, and the Grand National Speech and Debate Tournament in 2004.

Since 1974, it has won at least one national championship in debate in fourteen individual years. It has also won an Illinois High School Association (IHSA) state championship in 18 of the 35 years since 1982, and has placed as runner up in three of those years.

== Athletics ==
Glenbrook North offers many sports including, but not limited to baseball, basketball, bowling, cheerleading, cross-country, football, golf, ice hockey, lacrosse, soccer, softball, swimming, tennis, track, and volleyball. The school is a member of the Central Suburban League North and the Illinois High School Association (IHSA). William Lutz Stadium, which is the home of the Glenbrook North's football, lacrosse, track and field and soccer teams, is named in honor of William Lutz, the school's first athletic director.

	Badminton	Baseball	Basketball	Bowling	Cheerleading	Cross Country	Football	Flag-Football	Golf	Gymnastics	Lacrosse	Poms	Soccer	Softball	Swimming and Diving	Tennis	Track and Field	Volleyball	Water Polo	Wrestling
Men's		✓	✓	✓	✓	✓	✓		✓	✓	✓		✓		✓	✓	✓	✓	✓	✓
Women's	✓		✓	✓	✓	✓		✓	✓	✓	✓	✓	✓	✓	✓	✓	✓	✓	✓	✓

In 2005, the school became the first large-enrollment high school in Illinois to have won a state championship in each of football, basketball and baseball. The following GBN teams have won IHSA sponsored state championship tournaments in the listed years:

- Baseball (2): 1966, 1974
- Basketball (boys) (1): 2005
- Football (1): 1974
- Golf (boys) (1): 2021
- Golf (girls) (3): 2023, 2024, 2025
- Hockey (5): 1984, 1985, 2007, 2008, 2015
- Soccer (boys) (1): 1983
- Swimming and diving (girls) (1): 1978
- Tennis (boys) (3): 1981, 1999, 2006
- Volleyball (boys) (2): 1993, 2021
- Field hockey (girls) (1): 2023

=== Basketball ===
On December 28, 2005, the school's basketball program gained national media attention when Jon Scheyer scored 21 points in the final 75 seconds of a comeback attempt against Proviso West. Scheyer fell one point short of the Glenbrook North basketball record for most points in a game, scoring 52 points. The team won the state championship in 2005.

=== Boys Tennis ===
The GBN boys tennis team won the state championship in 2006.

=== Hockey ===
Glenbrook North Hockey, a club team, won back-to-back state titles in 1984 and 1985, becoming the first varsity hockey team in Illinois to do so, and repeating the feat in 2007 and 2008. In 2011, 2013, and 2014, the team returned to the title game but lost to the New Trier Trevians. In 2015, it defeated Benet Academy in the state title game in overtime, 3–2. The Spartans hockey program has won five Illinois state championships.

=== Boys Volleyball ===
The GBN boys volleyball team won the state championship in 2021.

=== Golf ===
Glenbrook North Boys golf team won the state championship in 2021. The team carded the IHSA Finals All-Time low score.

Glenbrook North Girls golf team won the state championship in 2023, 2024, and 2025. This was the first GBN athletic team to win 3 back-to-back-to-back IHSA state championships. The team carded the All-Time IHSA Girls Golf State Finals scoring record with a 36-hole team score of 585 in 2024, beating the previous record score by 10 strokes.

== Clubs ==
Glenbrook North is home to many different extracurricular clubs. An accurate, up-to-date list is difficult to keep, as clubs are added and dropped as students graduate or lose interest. However, some clubs include Key Club, Scholastic Bowl, World Languages Honor Society, Environmental Club, Student Government Association, Open Forum, PAWS (Protection of Animal Welfare by Students), and Spartan Buddies (an affiliate of Best Buddies International).

== Notable alumni ==
- Scott Adsit, comedian, actor and writer
- Kaskade, DJ
- Benjamin Agosto, attended freshman and sophomore years, ice dancer
- Steven D. Binder, screenwriter, film and television producer
- Jayne Brook, actress
- Mike Brown, NHL hockey player
- Nusrat Jahan Choudhury, U.S. District Judge for the Eastern District of New York
- Chris Collins, basketball player and coach
- Jesse Compher, PWHL hockey player and 2022 Olympic silver medalist
- JT Compher, NHL hockey player
- Dave Cruikshank, speed skater
- John Cynn, professional poker player
- William A. Edelstein, physicist
- Kiana Eide, group rhythmic gymnast, part of the American team in the women's rhythmic group all-around event at the 2016 Summer Olympics.
- Andrew Gabel, speed skater
- Frank Galati, director, writer and actor
- Ken Goldstein, musician, film and television writer, producer, director and occasional actor
- Anne Henning, speed skater
- John Hughes, filmmaker
- Johnny, a singer and member of the K-pop boy band NCT
- Alisa Kano, group rhythmic gymnast, part of the American team in the women's rhythmic group all-around event at the 2016 Summer Olympics.
- Jason Kipnis, MLB player
- Ken Kurson, political consultant, journalist, and author
- Robert Kurson, author
- Al Lewis, columnist
- Natalie McGiffert, group rhythmic gymnast, part of the American team in the women's rhythmic group all-around event at the 2016 Summer Olympics.
- Scott McGrew, news anchor at NBC Universal
- Pat Misch, MLB player
- Beth Moses, commercial astronaut and the first woman to fly into space on a commercial launch vehicle
- Don Ohlmeyer, television producer
- Laura Okmin, FOX NFL sideline reporter
- John Park, singer
- Leah Poulos-Mueller, speed skater
- Doug Rader, MLB player
- Ryan Gary Raddon, DJ, record producer and remixer
- Monica Rokhman, group rhythmic gymnast, part of the American team in the women's rhythmic group all-around event at the 2016 Summer Olympics.
- Scott Sanderson, MLB player
- Jon Scheyer, 2006, American-Israeli McDonald's All American, All-American basketball player for national champion 2009–10 Duke basketball team. Current Duke men's basketball head coach.
- Ballard Smith, former president of the San Diego Padres
- Michael T. Weiss, actor
- Jahan Yousaf & Yasmine Yousaf, co-founders of Krewella

== Notable faculty ==
- Brian James was the varsity boys basketball head coach (1990–1995). He is currently an assistant coach for the Northwestern Wildcats men's basketball.
- Vladimir Pyshnenko was the head senior coach for the district-operated Glenbrook Aquatics program. He won a gold medal and two silver medals in swimming at the 1992 and 1996 Summer Olympics.
- Samuel Alex works as both an instructional assistant and a Broadcasting Teacher at Glenbrook North, as well as a red-carpet reporter and radio personality on his radio program "The Sam Alex Show". He is currently a special correspondent for the American syndicated entertainment television news magazine show Celebrity Page.
