= Northbrook, Illinois =

- Village
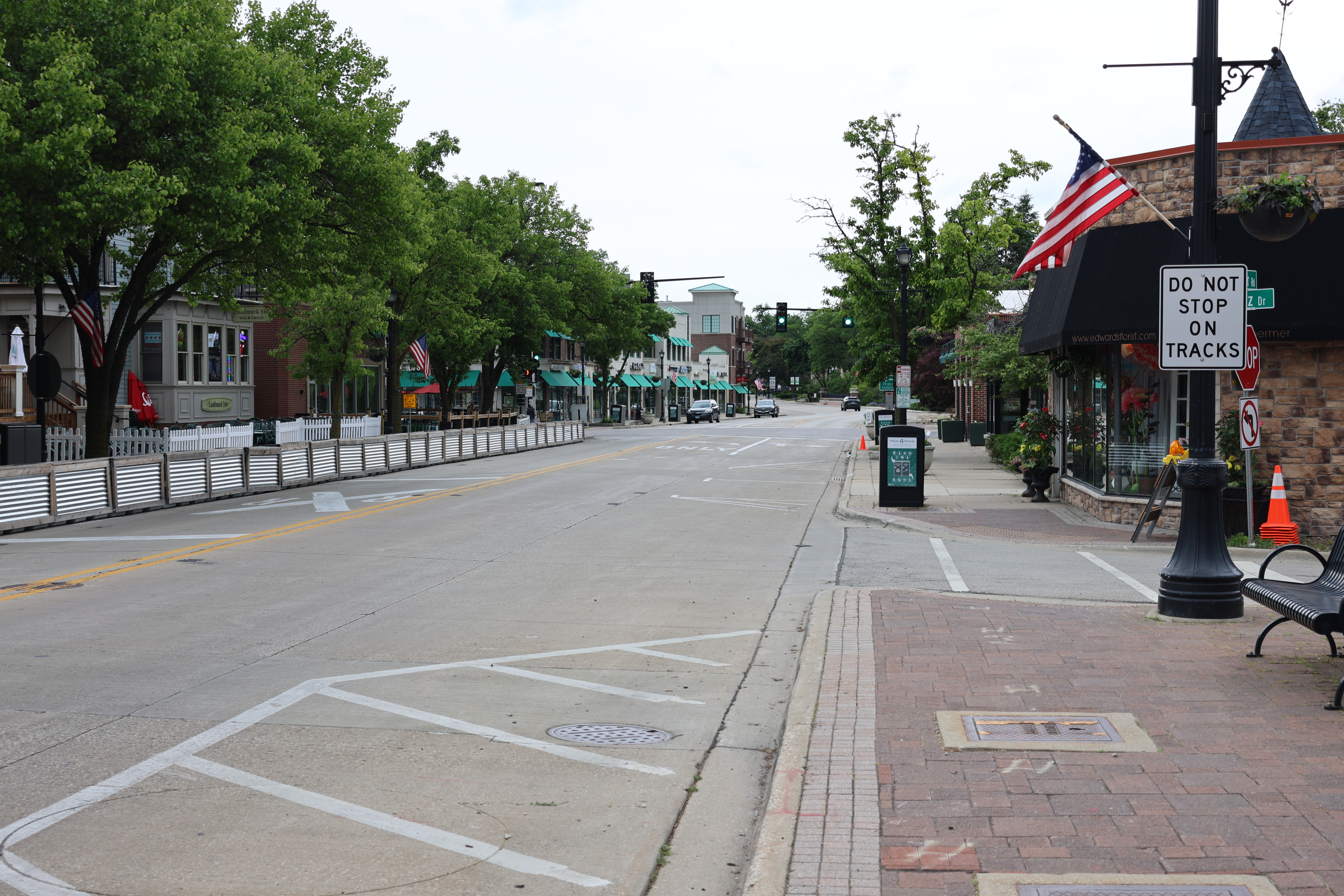
- Downtown Northbrook, as seen from Shermer Rd.

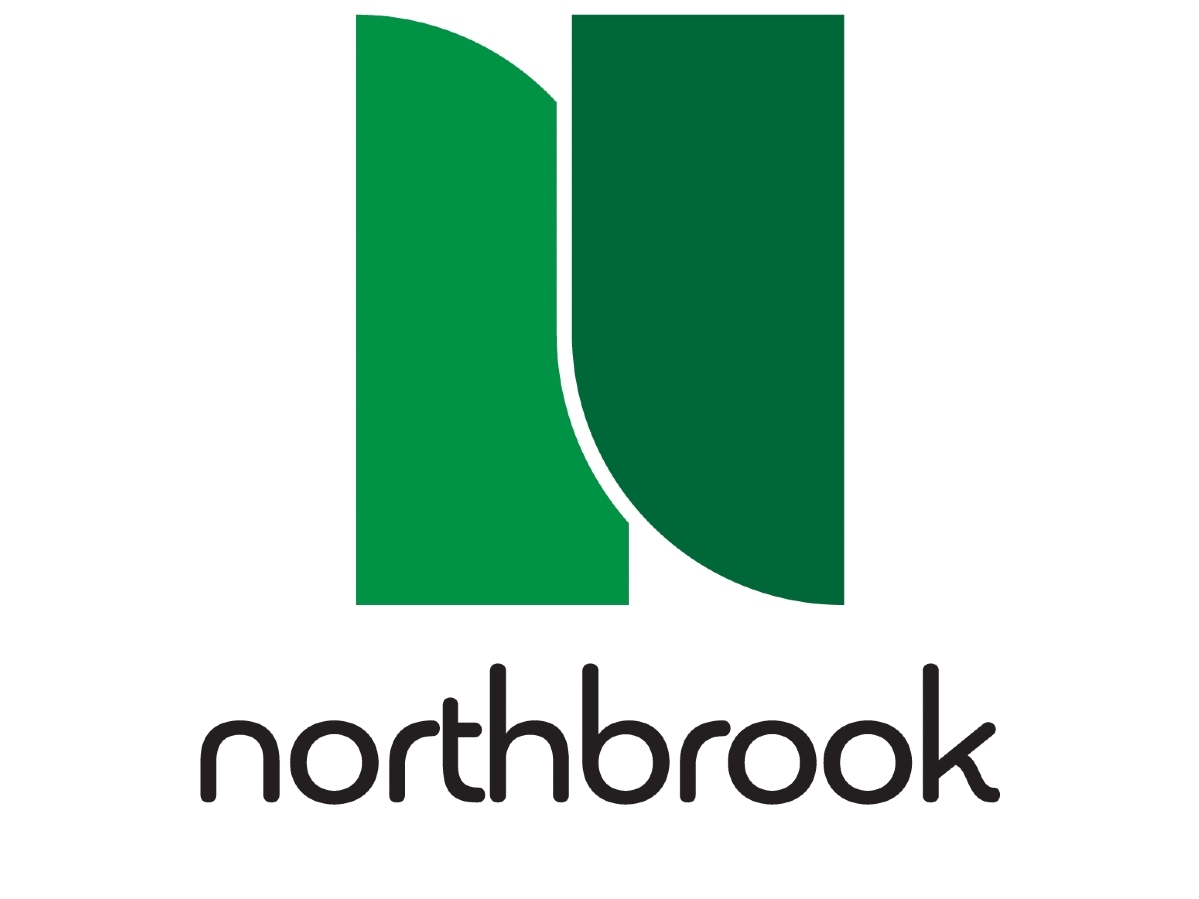
- Seal Logo
- Interactive map outlining Northbrook
- Location of Northbrook within Cook County, Illinois

- Location within Greater Chicago Location within Illinois Location within the United States
- Coordinates: 42°7′45″N 87°50′27″W
- Country: United States
- State: Illinois
- County: Cook
- Townships: Northfield and Wheeling
- Incorporated: 1901

Government
  - Type: Council–manager
  - Village President: Kathryn L. Ciesla
  - Village Board: Trustees: Robert P. Israel; Muriel J. Collison; Heather E. Ross; Johannah K. Hebl; Daniel H. Pepoon; Joy U. Ebhomielen
  - Village Manager: Cara Pavlicek

Area
  - Total: 13.31 sq mi (34.46 km^{2})
  - Land: 13.24 sq mi (34.29 km^{2})
  - Water: 0.066 sq mi (0.17 km^{2}) 0.45%
- Elevation: 646 ft (197 m)

Population (2020)
  - Total: 35,222
  - Density: 2,660.2/sq mi (1,027.12/km^{2})
- Demonym: Northbrookian

Standard of living (2020-24)
  - Per capita income: $87,173
  - Median home value: $652,300
- Time zone: UTC-06:00 (Central)
  - Summer (DST): UTC-05:00 (Central)
- ZIP code(s): 60062, 60065
- Area code(s): 847/224
- Geocode: 53481
- FIPS code: 17-53481
- GNIS ID: 2399526
- Commuter Rail
- Website: www.northbrook.il.us

Northbrook is a village in Cook County, Illinois, United States. It is a suburb of Chicago in the greater North Shore, part of a collection of upscale residential communities north of Chicago. The population was 35,222 at the 2020 census. It is within Northfield Township, Illinois, bordering Lake County.

When incorporated in 1901, the village was known as Shermerville in honor of Frederick Schermer, who donated the land for its first train station. The village changed its name to Northbrook in 1923 as an effort to improve its public image. The name was chosen because the West Fork of the North Branch of the Chicago River runs through the village.

Glenbrook North High School, founded in 1953 as Glenbrook High School, is located in Northbrook. The village is also home to the Northbrook Park District, the Northbrook Court shopping mall, the Ed Rudolph Velodrome, the Chicago Curling Club, and the Northbrook Public Library.

== History ==
Members of the Potawatomi tribe were the earliest recorded residents of the Northbrook area. After signing the 1833 Treaty of Chicago, the Potawatomi ceded their Illinois lands and moved to a place near Council Bluffs, Iowa. Afterward, Joel Sterling Sherman moved from Connecticut with his family and bought 159 acres (64 ha) of land in the northwest quarter of Section 10 for $1.25 per acre; Northbrook's downtown is located on this site. A German immigrant named Frederick Schermer donated a portion of the land he bought from Sherman to be used for the town's first railroad station, which was named after him. By the 1870s, Shermerville (which also took its name from Shermer) was a farming community. In 1901 the community was incorporated as the Village of Shermerville after a close referendum for incorporation. At the time of incorporation, it had 311 residents and 60 houses. In these early years, Shermerville became notorious for rowdy gatherings at its five saloons; by 1921, therefore, residents believed that the name "Shermerville" had a negative reputation and sought to change it. A renaming contest was held, and the name "Northbrook" was submitted by the US postmaster (and then President of the National Rural Letter Carriers' Association) Edward Landwehr. Landwehr was the son of Herman and Anna Helene Landwehr, both German immigrants and early settlers in the community and for whose family Landwehr Road in Northbrook is named. In 1923, "Northbrook", the winning name, was adopted. At the time, Northbrook had 500 residents. Later on, after the end of World War II, Northbrook's population began to rapidly increase. In 1997, President Bill Clinton visited Northbrook to congratulate the 8th-grade students of Northfield Township (which is mainly Northbrook) for getting the highest score on a world science test, and for getting the second-highest score on a world math test. Between 1950 and 1980, the town's population rose from 3,319 to 30,735. Northbrook was the first community not bordering Lake Michigan to filter Lake Michigan water for public use. Owing to the suburbanization of the community, the last working farm in Northbrook, the Wayside Farm, was sold and closed in 1987.

== Geography ==
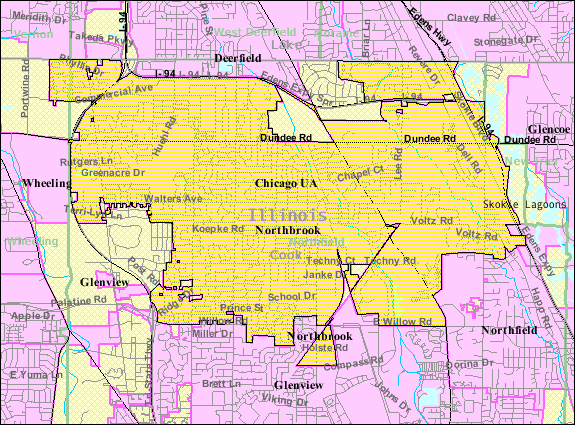
US Census Bureau reference map

Northbrook is a suburb of the city of Chicago, located at 42°7′45″N 87°50′27″W (42.129226, −87.840715). in the extreme northeastern region of Illinois. Whilst the vast majority of the village lies within Northfield Township, its northwest corner is situated in Wheeling Township. Northbrook shares a border with Northfield to its southeast, Glenview and Prospect Heights to its southwest and south, Glencoe directly east, Highland Park to its northeast, Deerfield directly north, Riverwoods to its northwest, and Wheeling directly west. Techny, once a separate community, was annexed by Northbrook in 1989 and predominantly lies south of Voltz Road and stretches south to border Glenview. Interstate 294 curves along Northbrook's western edge while the Edens Spur marks most of the village's northern boundary. Illinois Route 68 stretches west from Wheeling into Northbrook, terminating at the Edens Expressway near Glencoe. In addition, a portion of Illinois Route 43 cuts through Northbrook.

According to the 2020 US gazetteer files, the village has a total area of 13.30 square miles (34.4 km^{2}; 3,440 ha), of which 13.24 square miles (34.3 km^{2}; 3,430 ha) (or 99.55%) is land, and 0.07 square miles (0.18 km^{2}; 18 ha) (or 0.45%) is water. Situated along the West Fork of the North Branch of the Chicago River, Techny Prairie Park and Fields is the largest park in Northbrook at 113.82 acres and features picnic areas, a sled hill, batting cages, the nine-hole Anetsberger Golf Course and Techny Prairie Activity Center, a 44,200 square foot facility housing fitness equipment and studios, an indoor track, pickleball courts, and more. One of the biggest lakes in Northbrook, Lake Shermerville, is located within Wood Oaks Green Park, a 55.9 acre open space with fishing platforms, tennis courts, a playground, bike trail, and more. Northbrook lies within the Chicago/Calumet Rivers watershed.

=== Area codes ===
From 1947 until 1988, Northbrook used a single area code, 312. However, in 1988, the 312 area code was made exclusive to Chicago and the 708 area code was introduced. Then, in 1996, the 708 area code was split into three: 708, 630, and 847. Currently, Northbrook uses the 847 area code as well as the 224 area code which was introduced in 2002.

=== Climate ===
Due to its proximity to the city, Northbrook's climate shares many of the same traits as Chicago. Northbrook lies in a humid continental climate zone (Köppen: Dfa) and experiences four distinct seasons. Northbrook receives an average of 37.82 inches (961 mm) of precipitation each year. According to MyForecast, Northbrook's record high is 104 °F (40 °C), and the record low is -24 °F (-31.1 °C). Summers are hot and humid, with frequent heat waves. July is the hottest month, and the daily average temperature is 82 °F (27.7 °C), while the daily low temperatures are around 66 °F (18.8 °C). On average, summer temperatures reach at least 90 °F (32 °C) on as many as 16 days. Winters are relatively cold and snowy, with blizzards sometimes occurring, as in 2011. There are many sunny but cold days in winter. The average winter high from December through March is about 36 °F (2.2 °C), with January and February being the coldest months; a polar vortex occurred in January 2019. Spring and autumn are mild, short seasons. Dew point temperatures in the summer range from an average of 56 °F (13.3 °C) in June to 62 °F (16.7 °C) in July. Like all Chicago suburbs, Northbrook lies within USDA plant hardiness zone 5b.

Climate data for Northbrook, Illinois
| Month | Jan | Feb | Mar | Apr | May | Jun | Jul | Aug | Sep | Oct | Nov | Dec | Year |
|---|---|---|---|---|---|---|---|---|---|---|---|---|---|
| Mean daily maximum °F (°C) | 32 (0) | 36 (2) | 45 (7) | 57 (14) | 68 (20) | 78 (26) | 83 (28) | 81 (27) | 74 (23) | 62 (17) | 49 (9) | 36 (2) | 58 (15) |
| Mean daily minimum °F (°C) | 16 (−9) | 19 (−7) | 28 (−2) | 38 (3) | 47 (8) | 57 (14) | 63 (17) | 62 (17) | 54 (12) | 42 (6) | 33 (1) | 20 (−7) | 40 (4) |
| Average precipitation inches (mm) | 1.81 (46) | 1.80 (46) | 2.37 (60) | 3.58 (91) | 4.01 (102) | 3.67 (93) | 3.63 (92) | 4.77 (121) | 3.48 (88) | 3.24 (82) | 3.06 (78) | 2.40 (61) | 37.82 (960) |
| Average snowfall inches (cm) | 11 (28) | 8 (20) | 5 (13) | 1 (2.5) | 0 (0) | 0 (0) | 0 (0) | 0 (0) | 0 (0) | 0 (0) | 1 (2.5) | 7 (18) | 33 (84) |
Source 1: Weather.com
Source 2: US Climate Data

== Demographics ==
Historical population
| Census | Pop. | Note | %± |
|---|---|---|---|
| 1910 | 441 | | — |
| 1920 | 554 | | 25.6% |
| 1930 | 1,193 | | 115.3% |
| 1940 | 1,265 | | 6.0% |
| 1950 | 3,348 | | 164.7% |
| 1960 | 11,635 | | 247.5% |
| 1970 | 25,422 | | 118.5% |
| 1980 | 30,778 | | 21.1% |
| 1990 | 32,308 | | 5.0% |
| 2000 | 33,435 | | 3.5% |
| 2010 | 33,170 | | −0.8% |
| 2020 | 35,222 | | 6.2% |
U.S. Census Bureau QuickFacts

=== Racial and ethnic composition ===
Northbrook village, Illinois – Racial and ethnic composition Note: the US Census treats Hispanic/Latino as an ethnic category. This table excludes Latinos from the racial categories and assigns them to a separate category. Hispanics/Latinos may be of any race.
| Race / Ethnicity (NH = Non-Hispanic) | Pop 2000 | Pop 2010 | Pop 2020 | % 2000 | % 2010 | % 2020 |
|---|---|---|---|---|---|---|
| White alone (NH) | 29,346 | 27,892 | 26,998 | 87.77% | 84.09% | 76.65% |
| Black or African American alone (NH) | 190 | 201 | 257 | 0.57% | 0.61% | 0.73% |
| Native American or Alaska Native alone (NH) | 8 | 8 | 16 | 0.02% | 0.02% | 0.05% |
| Asian alone (NH) | 2,952 | 3,869 | 5,746 | 8.83% | 11.66% | 16.31% |
| Pacific Islander alone (NH) | 3 | 4 | 2 | 0.01% | 0.01% | 0.01% |
| Other race alone (NH) | 30 | 25 | 79 | 0.09% | 0.08% | 0.22% |
| Mixed race or Multiracial (NH) | 290 | 343 | 922 | 0.87% | 1.03% | 2.62% |
| Hispanic or Latino (any race) | 616 | 828 | 1,202 | 1.84% | 2.50% | 3.41% |
| Total | 33,435 | 33,170 | 35,222 | 100.00% | 100.00% | 100.00% |

=== 2020 census ===
As of the 2020 census, Northbrook had a population of 35,222. The median age was 48.5 years. 22.3% of residents were under the age of 18 and 26.6% were 65 years of age or older. For every 100 females, there were 92.4 males, and for every 100 females age 18 and over, there were 88.8 males. The population density was 2,647.28 inhabitants per square mile (1,022.12/km^{2}).

100.0% of residents lived in urban areas, while 0.0% lived in rural areas.

There were 13,324 households and 9,347 families in Northbrook, of which 31.6% had children under the age of 18 living in them. Of all households, 65.3% were married-couple households, 9.9% had a male householder and no spouse or partner present, and 22.7% had a female householder and no spouse or partner present. About 23.6% of all households were made up of individuals, and 16.5% had someone living alone who was 65 years of age or older.

There were 14,209 housing units, of which 6.2% were vacant. The average housing unit density was 1,067.94 per square mile (412.33/km^{2}). The homeowner vacancy rate was 1.6% and the rental vacancy rate was 11.5%.

=== Income and poverty ===
According to the United States Census Bureau, the median household income in Northbrook was $150,236 in 2022.

=== Religion ===
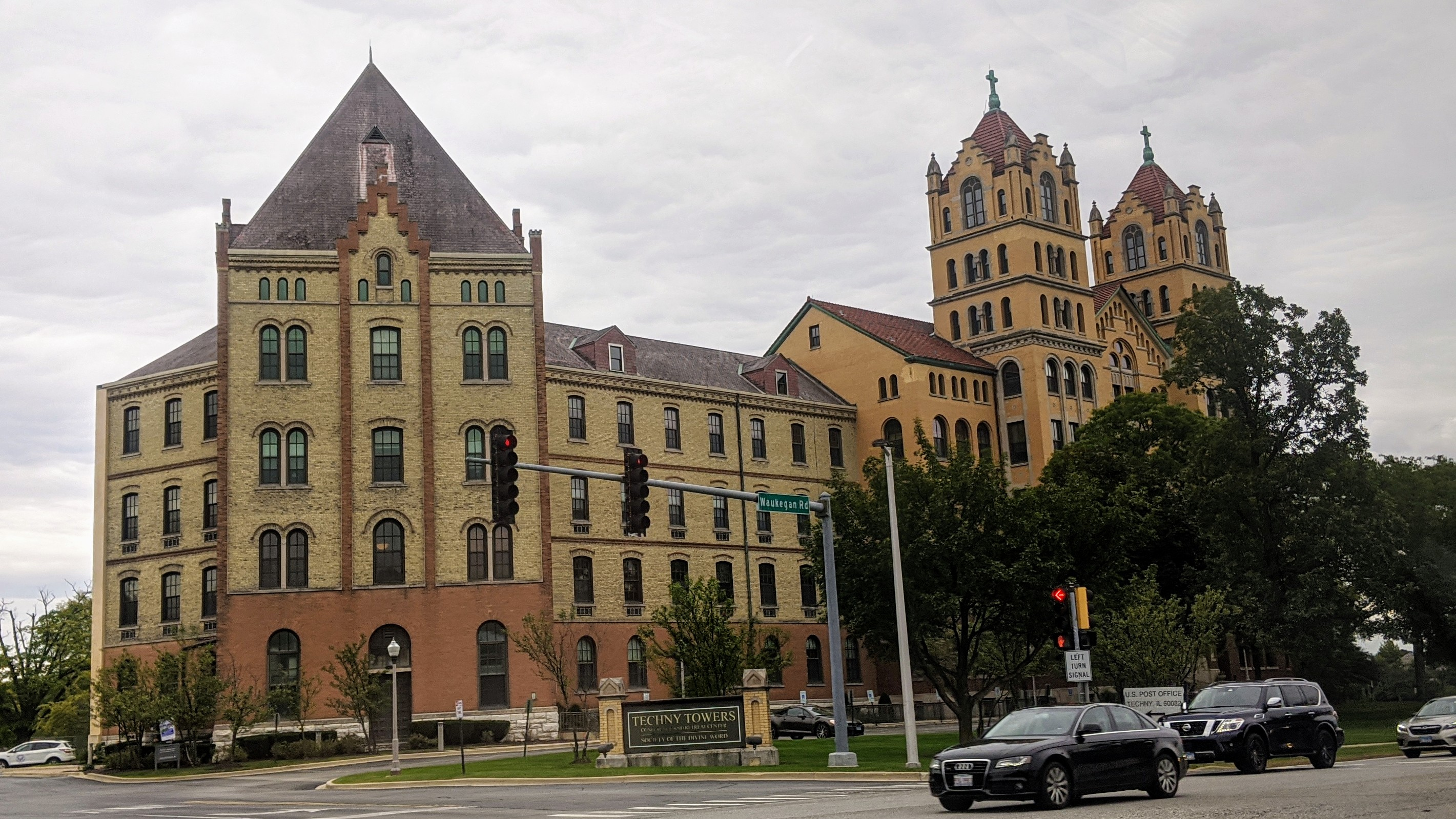
Techny Towers

Northbrook is home to a diverse religious community including Christians, Jews, Muslims, and Hindus.

The North Shore is known for having a significant Jewish population; Northbrook has eight synagogues, a K-8 Jewish Day School, a branch of JCC Chicago, and Hebrew language courses at its high school.

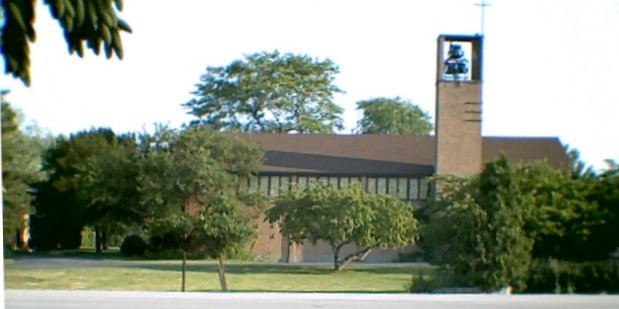
St. Giles Episcopal Church

Besides Judaism, Protestantism and Catholicism are major religions in Northbrook. Northbrook has many churches, including the St. Nortbert Catholic Church, the Village Presbyterian Church of Northbrook, the Northbrook United Methodist Church, the St. Giles Episcopal Church, and the Northbrook Covenant Evangelical Church. There is also a small Eastern Orthodox community.

The Society of the Divine Word constructed Northbrook's Techny Towers in 1901 to house their North American headquarters and St. Joseph's Technical School, which operated for twelve years; Techny's name is derived from this school. St. Mary's Mission Seminary, the first of its kind which prepared priests and brothers for foreign missions, was opened by the Divine Word Missionaries in 1909.

The Islamic Cultural Center of Greater Chicago is a mosque located in Northbrook. Nearby, the Hanuman Mandir of Greater Chicago is in Glenview and the Bahá'í House of Worship is in Wilmette.

== Economy ==
Northbrook has a workforce population of 27,058 people with 15,219 who are employed, according to a 2018 estimate from the U.S. Census Bureau. The village has over 3,000 businesses providing more than 45,000 jobs, surpassing its population by over 10,000 positions. Northbrook’s economy is centered around the service industry, primarily professional services, health care, administration, retail, and manufacturing. The village has over 2.4 million square feet of commercial space, 1 million of which is at Northbrook Court. The community’s largest employer at 8,000 personnel is Allstate, which is based in an unincorporated area of Northbrook. In 2021, the company announced it would sell the property. UL, a Nationally Recognized Testing Laboratory, is headquartered in Northbrook and employs 2,000 workers. Bell Flavors & Fragrances and Crate & Barrel are also located in the village.

Additionally, Northbrook is a base for several multinational corporations including the North American headquarters of Astellas, a Japanese pharmaceutical company, and Italian-based Barilla, the largest pasta company in the world.

Approximately 13% of Northbrook workers are employed at businesses inside the city limits, while about 87% commute elsewhere. The majority of the city's employed residents (67%) commute to work in single-occupant vehicles, while 5 percent use carpools and 10 percent use public transportation. Northbrook workplaces have employees who live across Cook county, with 5 percent from within the village, 18.9% from Chicago, 2.4% from Glenview, and 2.2% from Arlington Heights and Wheeling.

The village’s retailers had total sales of $1 billion in 2022 and are mostly concentrated in strip malls inside corridors near major roads including Sanders Road, Skokie Boulevard, and Lake Cook Road. Northbrook Court opened in 1976 and has 103 storefronts including shops, restaurants, and an AMC movie theater, although nearly half of the mall’s spaces are unoccupied due to the loss of major retailers and anchor tenants caused in part by the retail apocalypse and the impact of the COVID-19 pandemic on retail.

== Arts and culture ==
Founded in 1973, the Northbrook Historical Society works to preserve Northbrook's heritage and educate people about it. It operates a museum located in the former Northfield Inn.

Founded in 1980, the Northbrook Symphony is a nonprofit that plays orchestral music in the town.

=== Annual cultural events ===
Northbrook's largest event is Northbrook Days, a multi-day festival typically held every year towards the end of the summer. It features carnival games, roller coasters and amusement rides, food vendors, live music, and raffles. Another prominent event is the Farmers' Market held every Wednesday from June to October in the Meadow Shopping Plaza parking lot on the corner of Cherry Lane & Meadow Street in downtown Northbrook. There, vendors sell locally made goods such as produce, cheese, pies, and condiments.

== Parks and recreation ==
Northbrook has many parks and golf courses. Parks in Northbrook include Village Green Park, Techny Prairie Park and Fields, Wood Oaks Green Park, Stonegate Park, Crestwood Park, and Greenfield Park. Golf courses in Northbrook include Heritage Oaks Golf Club (formerly Sportsman's Country Club), Anetsberger Golf Course, and Willow Hill Golf Course. Other facilities in the town include the Ed Rudolph Velodrome, Techny Prairie Activity Center, Northbrook Sports Center, Northbrook Leisure Center, and Meadowhill Aquatic Center. The Skokie Valley Trail passes through the town.

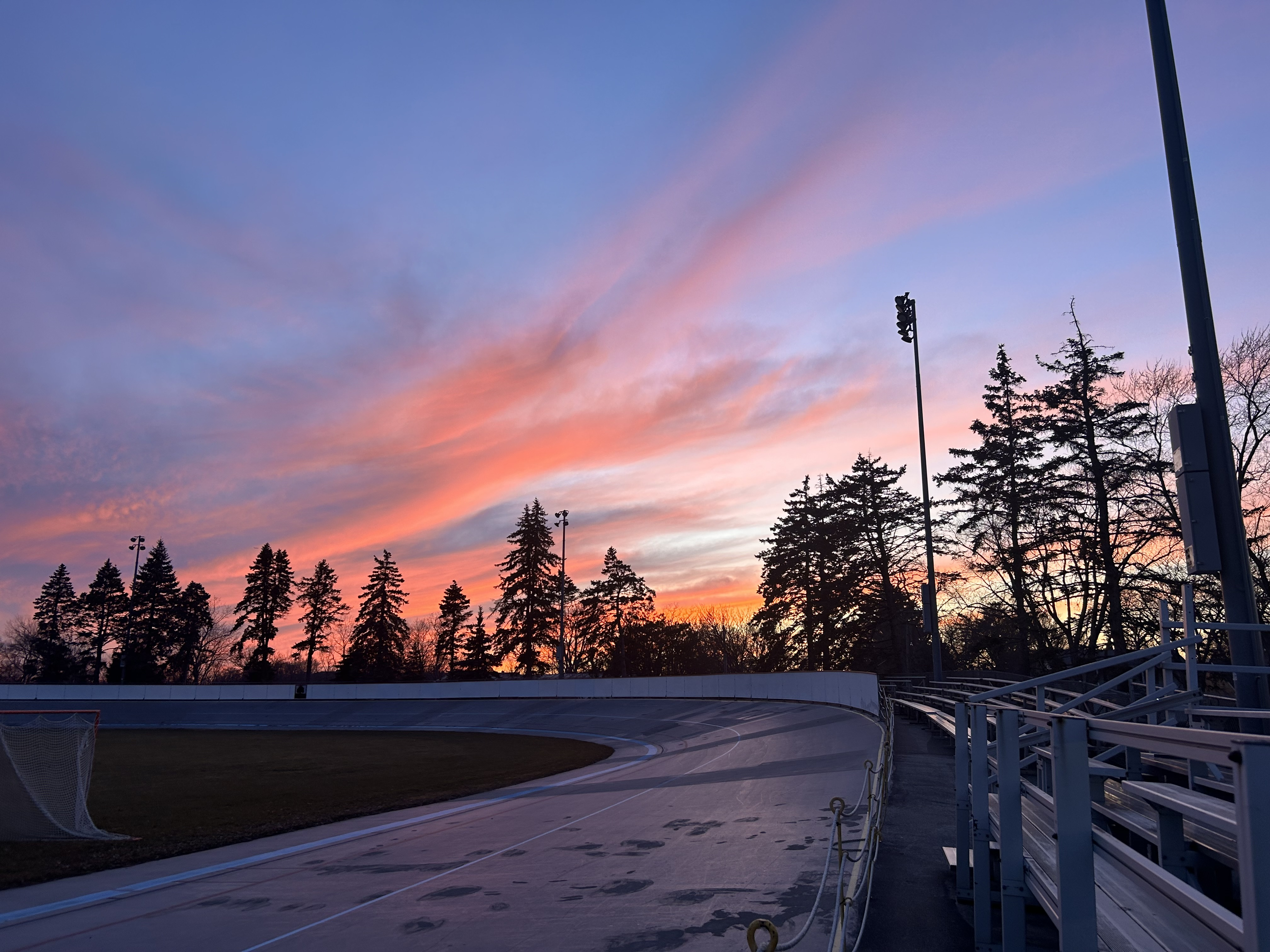
Ed Rudolph Velodrome

In recognition of the village's vast greenspace, the Arbor Day Foundation has designated Northbrook as a Tree City U.S.A. community since 1994.

The Northbrook Park District, headquartered in Northbrook, operates recreational facilities in Northbrook. The 17.25-square-mile (44.7 km^{2}) park district, formed in June 1927, serves all of Northbrook and some unincorporated areas within Cook County. The park district lies within the townships of Northfield and Wheeling.

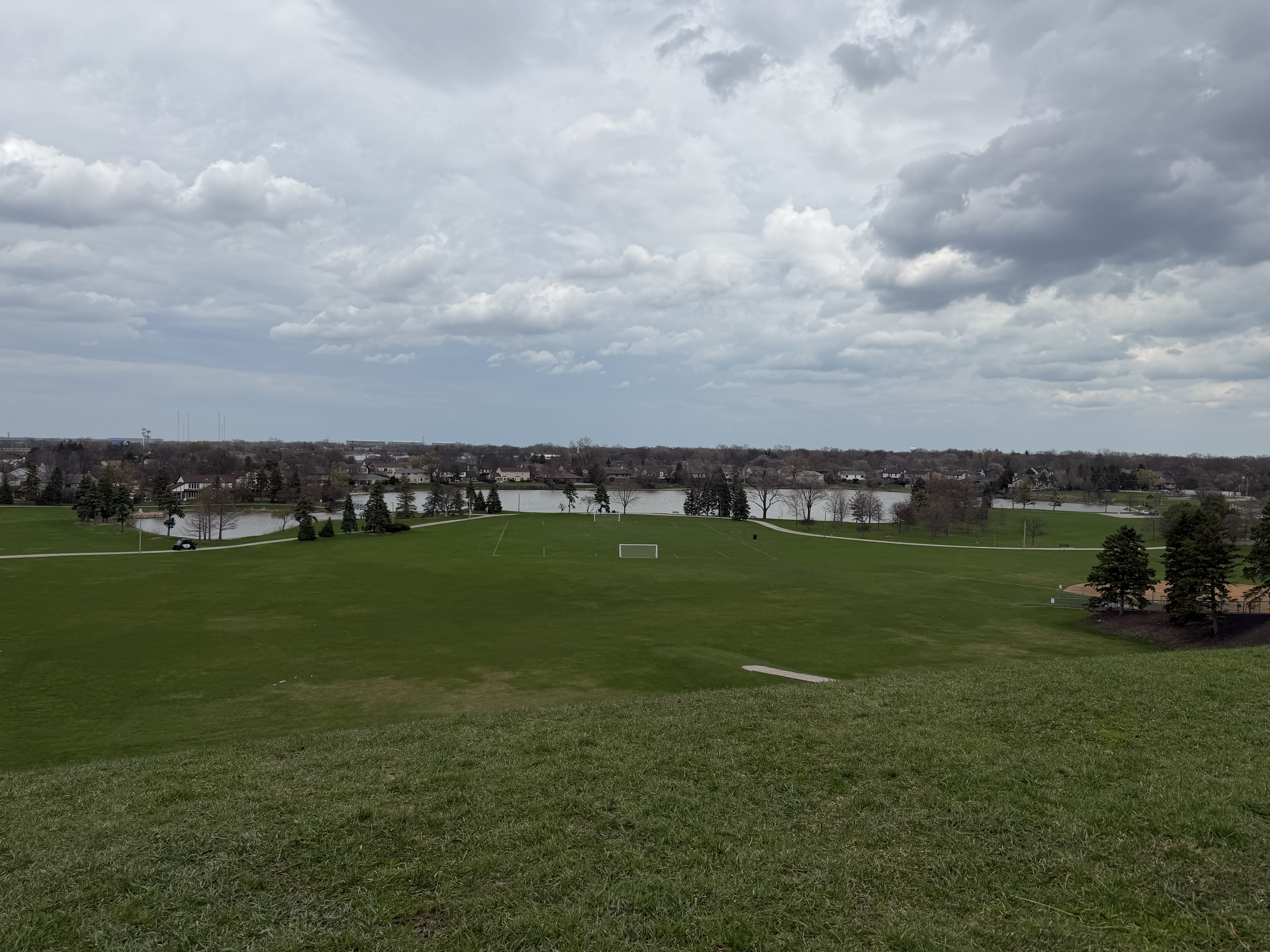
Wood Oaks Green Park

Situated along the Des Plaines River Trail upon the Des Plaines River, the River Trail Nature Center houses educational exhibits and events about local biology and wildlife. Among the region's 194 tree species, 37% are native to the area including the American sycamore, the common hackberry, and Northbrook's village tree, the Bebb Oak. Other native plants include white wild indigo, Junegrass, and ninebark.

Northbrook is in the Forest Preserve District of Cook County's Region 3 and Region 4, which encompass nature such as Dam No. 1 Woods-East and Somme Nature Preserve, Prairie Grove, and Woods.

== Law and government ==
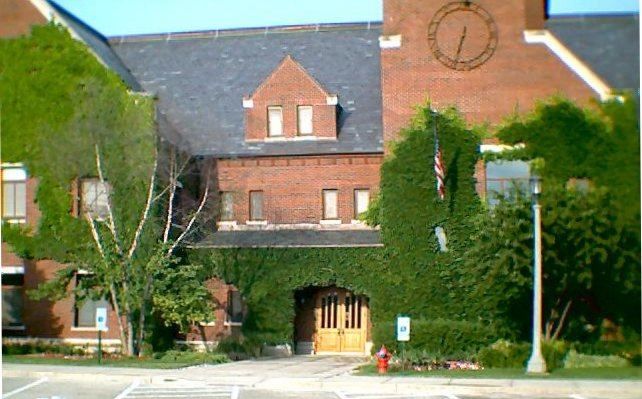
Northbrook's Village Hall

The Village of Northbrook adopted a council-manager form of government after a 1953 referendum. The Village President, six-member Board of Trustees, and the Village Clerk, all of whom must be residents of Northbrook, are elected at large for staggered four year terms. The board establishes policies and hires a village manager to operate the day-to-day business. The most recent board election took place in 2025, with Kathryn Ciesla winning as village president. The current board consists of:

| Position | Name | Elected | Term expires |
|---|---|---|---|
| President | Kathryn L. Ciesla | 2025 | 2029 |
| Trustee | Robert P. Israel | 2023 | 2027 |
| Trustee | Heather E. Ross | 2023 | 2027 |
| Trustee | Matt Cassidy | 2025 | 2029 |
| Trustee | Michelle Z. Kohler | 2025 | 2029 |
| Trustee | Johannah K. Hebl | 2023 | 2027 |
| Trustee | Joy U. Ebhomielen | 2025 | 2029 |
| Clerk | Derek Gau | 2025 | 2029 |

The Northbrook Police Department provides law enforcement and the Northbrook Fire Department provides fire suppression and emergency medical services for the village and its residents. Civil and criminal law cases are heard in the Cook County Circuit Court of the State of Illinois court system, or in the Northern District of Illinois in the federal system. In the state court, the public prosecutor is the Illinois state's attorney; in the Federal court it is the United States attorney.

=== Politics ===
Like other suburbs in the area, Northbrook is considered a Democratic stronghold. In the 2008 presidential election, Barack Obama received over 60% of Northfield Township's vote, while, likewise, Joe Biden earned more than 66% of votes in 2020.

At the national level, Northbrook is represented by Senators Dick Durbin and Tammy Duckworth, both Democrats. The northern and western parts of the village are part of Illinois's 10th congressional district, which is currently represented by Brad Schneider, a Democrat from Deerfield. The southern and eastern parts of the village are part of Illinois's 9th congressional district, which is currently represented by Jan Schakowsky, a Democrat from Evanston.

At the state level, Northbrook is a part of the 9th Senate District represented by Laura Fine (D-Glenview), the 29th Senate District represented by Julie Morrison (D-Deerfield), and the 30th Senate District represented by Adriane Johnson (D-Buffalo Grove). Additionally, the village lies within the 17th House District represented by Jennifer Gong-Gershowitz (D-Glenview), the 18th House District represented by Robyn Gabel (D-Chicago), the 57th House District represented by Jonathan Carroll (D-Northbrook), who has an office in Northbrook, the 58th House District represented by Bob Morgan (D-Deerfield), and the 59th House District represented by Daniel Didech (D-Buffalo Grove). At the county level, the municipality lies within District 14 represented by Scott R. Britton (D-Glenview).

=== Crime ===
The North Shore is known for its low crime rates. In fact, Northbrook was ranked by MoneyGeek, a financial planning website, as being the safest town in Illinois, largely due to its low ($116 per capita) expenditure on crime. Northbrook's crime rate is significantly lower than the national average. That being said, thefts in Northbrook are not uncommon and have made headlines. Moreover, a murderer who acted in Northbrook was on the U.S. Marshals ’15 Most Wanted Fugitives’ list until 2024.

== Education ==
=== Schools ===
==== Public schools ====
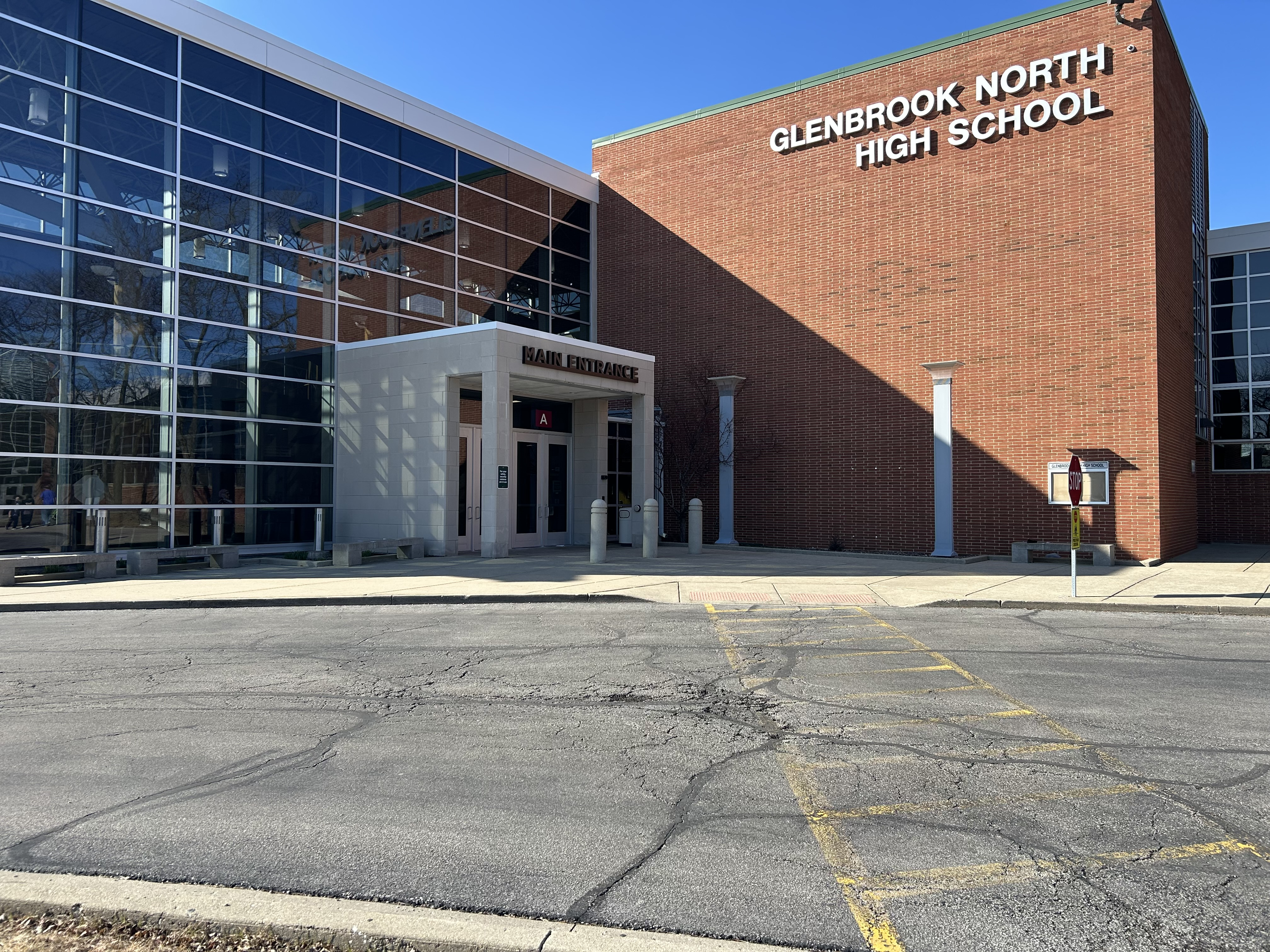
Glenbrook North High School

Northbrook is served by multiple school districts. Elementary districts District 27, District 28, District 30, and District 31 serve and are all headquartered in Northbrook. District 225 is the high school district serving the majority of Northbrook. Glenbrook North High School is located in and serves most of Northbrook.

District 27 operates three schools in Northbrook, including Hickory Point Elementary School (K-2), Shabonee Elementary School (3–5), and Wood Oaks Junior High School (6–8). District 28 operates three (K-5) elementary schools, Meadowbrook Elementary School, Greenbriar Elementary School, and Westmoor Elementary School. Northbrook Junior High School (6–8) is the district's middle school. District 30 operates Wescott Elementary School (K-5) in Northbrook and Willowbrook Elementary School (K-5) in Glenview, with both schools serving Northbrook. Maple School (6–8) in Northbrook is District 30's middle school. District 31 is served by Winkelman Elementary School (K-5) in Glenview and Field Junior High School (6-8) in Northbrook. District 225 includes Glenbrook North High School (9-12) in Northbrook, which serves a majority of the village.

Additionally, Wheeling Community Consolidated School District 21, headquartered in Wheeling, also serves a very small portion on the northwest side of Northbrook. Areas within CCSD 21 are served by two schools, Walt Whitman Elementary School in Wheeling and Holmes Junior High School in Wheeling. The western area within CCSD 21 is served by Township High School District 214. This area is a part of the Wheeling High School attendance area.

Sunset Ridge School District 29 in neighboring Northfield also includes small portions of the southeast side of Northbrook District 29 operates two schools in Northfield - Middlefork School (K-3) and Sunset Ridge School (4–8). Residents of District 29 are served by New Trier Township High School District, which operates a freshmen-only campus in Northfield and a campus for upperclassmen in Winnetka.

==== Private schools ====
- St. Norbert Catholic School, a K-8 Catholic Grade School.
- The Cove School, a K–12 school for disabled children.
- Solomon Schechter, a K-8 Jewish school.
- Countryside Montessori School, a K-8 private school.

=== Colleges ===
Oakton Community College in Skokie and Des Plaines serves Northbrook and surrounding areas.

=== Public library ===
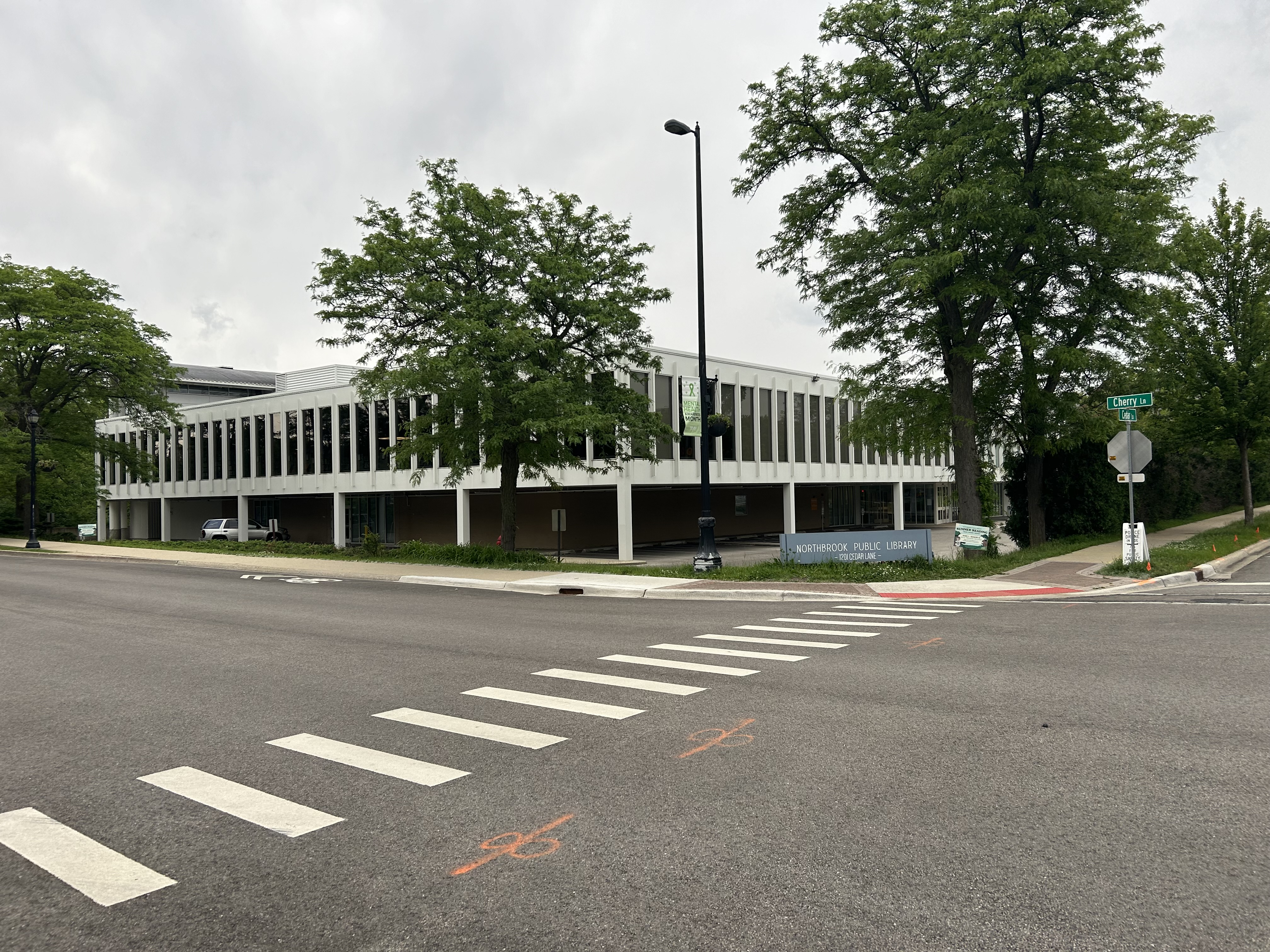
Northbrook Public Library

Northbrook Public Library is the public library of Northbrook. In 1919 the village’s first reading room was established. The Northbrook Public Library first opened in 1952. The current library opened in 1969, and many renovations have occurred, most notably in the 1990’s when a third floor was added to the building.

== Media ==
=== Television ===
Northbrook's government has a television station that all residents are able to access, NCTV Cable Channel 17. The station broadcasts meetings and information about the village.

=== Newspapers ===
Northbrook is served by two newspapers, the Northbrook Star and the Northbrook Herald. The Northbrook Star is a division of the Chicago Tribune, whilst Northbrook Herald is a division of Daily Herald, which is headquartered in Arlington Heights. In the past, the village also housed The Northbrook Tower, a division of 22nd Century Media, which went bankrupt in 2020.

=== Movies and filming ===
Director John Hughes, a native of Northbrook, used the fictional town of "Shermer" as a setting for several of his films. David Kamp of Vanity Fair said "Hughes's Shermer was partly Northbrook and partly a composite of all the North Shore's towns and neighborhoods—and, by extension, all the different milieus that existed in American suburbia" and that Shermer "was at once an Everytown for every teen and an explicit homage to Hughes's home turf, the North Shore suburbs above Chicago". Hughes and his family moved to Northbrook in 1962, and Hughes attended Glenbrook North High School.

Some exterior shots of Glenbrook North High School were used in the films The Breakfast Club and Ferris Bueller's Day Off. Northbrook is notable for being home to the "Save Ferris" water tower featured in the movie, which inspired the name of the synonymous band.

=== Radio ===
Northbrook is served by WGBK 88.5 FM, a non-commercial station operated by students at Glenbrook North High School and Glenbrook South High School. It broadcasts popular music, local high school sports, and covers local news.

== Infrastructure ==
=== Transportation ===
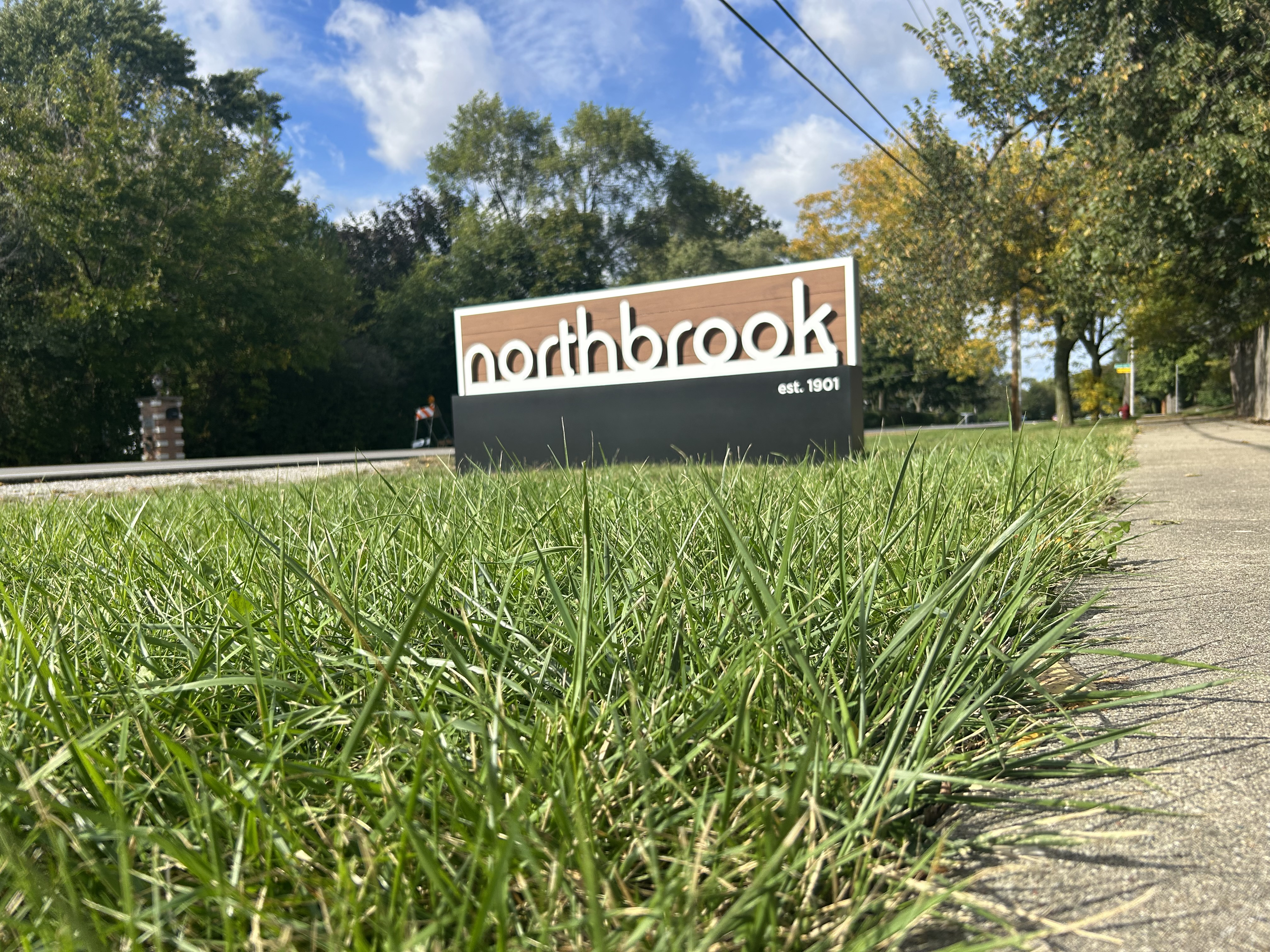
Sign at the entrance to the village along Landwehr Road

Northbrook is connected to Chicago's transportation network.

==== Roads ====
Interstate Highways:

- Edens Expressway
- Tri-State Tollway

U.S. Highways:

- Skokie Highway
- Milwaukee Avenue

Illinois State Routes:

- Milwaukee Avenue
- Waukegan Road
- Dundee Road

==== Public Transit ====
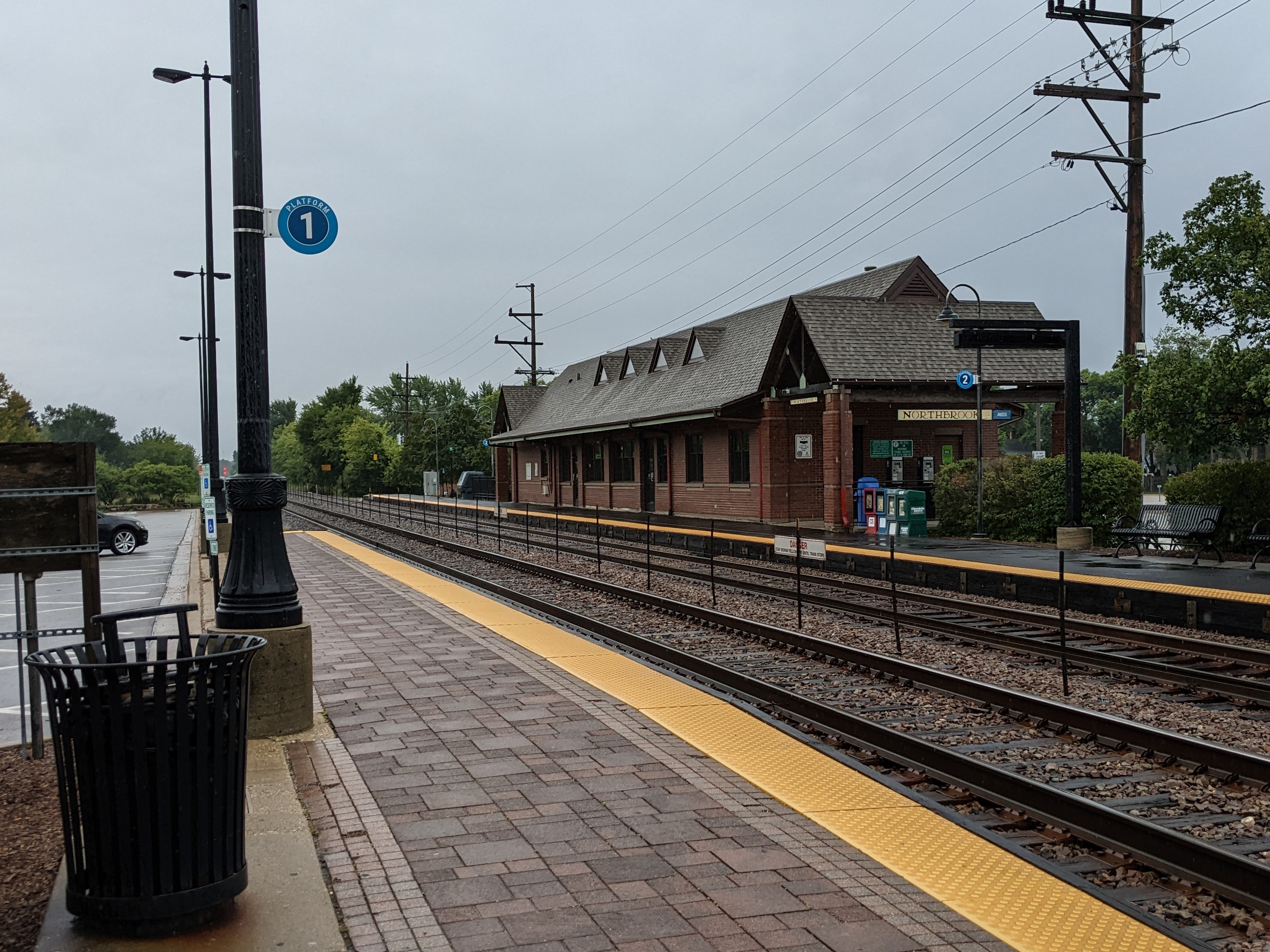
Northbrook Metra Station

Northbrook is served by Metra commuter rail. The village is located along the Milwaukee District North Line, which runs from Chicago Union Station to Fox Lake. Northbrook station is located on Shermer Road in downtown Northbrook and Lake Cook Road station is located just across the border in Deerfield. Furthermore, the Amtrak Hiawatha and Empire Builder trains stop in nearby Glenview.

Northbrook is also served by Pace suburban bus routes 213, 422, and 471.

For elderly or disabled residents, Northbrook offers paratransit in the form of a subsidized taxi program. Northfield Township, which Northbrook lies in, has an identical program called "Dial-a-Ride".

==== Airports ====
Northbrook is located 11 miles away from O'Hare International Airport, 24 miles away from Midway International Airport, and 3 miles away from Chicago Executive Airport. Other major regional airports within driving distance include Milwaukee Mitchell International Airport, Chicago Rockford International Airport, and Waukegan National Airport.

From 1929 to 1973 Northbrook was home to Sky Harbor Airport (formerly, IATA: OBK). Today the area it sat on has been transformed into Sky Harbor Business Park, which includes a restaurant and an air conditioning business that operate out of the airport's former hangar.

=== Utilities ===
Northbrook's government manages water and sewer services while other utilities are privately managed; electricity is provided by Commonwealth Edison (ComEd), internet can be accessed through Comcast or AT&T, natural gas is provided by Nicor Gas, and garbage, recycling, and yard waste management services are handled by LRS Waste Management.

The United States Postal Service operates three post offices in Northbrook: the Northbrook Post Office, the Northbrook Downtown Post Office, and the Techny Post Office.

=== Health Systems ===
Several clinics and medical service centers exist in Northbrook including a Lurie Children's Hospital's Outpatient Center. Nearby hospitals include Glenbrook Hospital and Highland Park Hospital, both of which are operated by Endeavor HealthSystem (formerly known as NorthShore University HealthSystem).

== Notable people ==
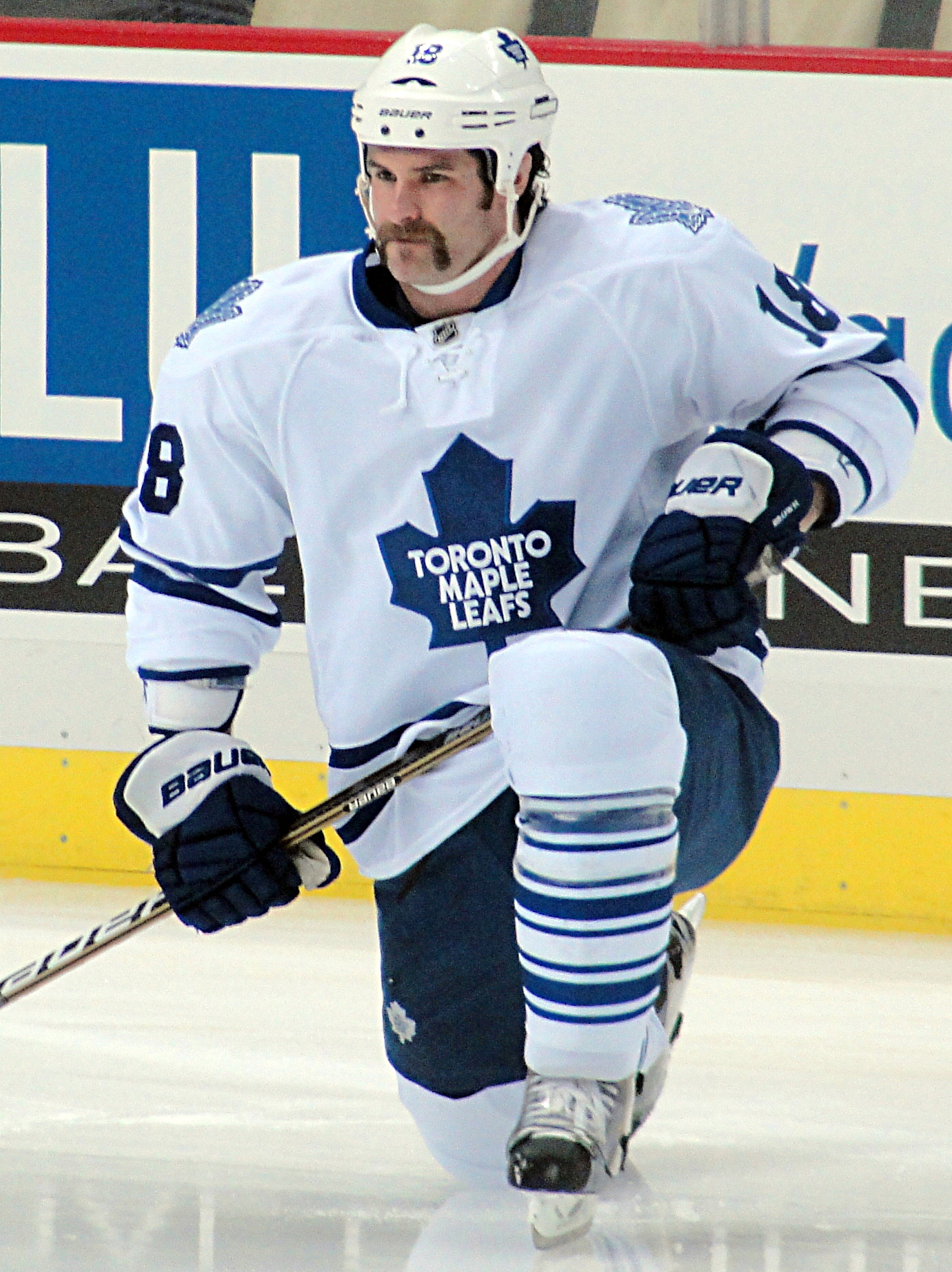
Mike Brown

- David Abidor (born 1992), soccer player
- Scott Adsit (born 1965), comedian, cast member of 30 Rock, voiced Baymax in the Disney film Big Hero 6
- Steve Bartman, namesake of "Bartman incident" from Game 6 of 2003 National League Championship Series
- Steven D. Binder (born 1971), Hollywood producer and screenwriter
- Jayne Brook (born 1960), actress
- Mike Brown (born 1985), right wing for several National Hockey League teams
- Nusrat Jahan Choudhury (born 1976), Judge of the United States District Court for the Eastern District of New York. She was a childhood resident of Northbrook.
- Meg Waite Clayton (born 1959), novelist
- Chris Collins (born 1974), basketball head coach, Northwestern
- J. T. Compher (born 1995), center for NHL's Colorado Avalanche
- Jesse Compher (born 1999), professional hockey player for the Toronto Sceptres
- Billy Donlon (born 1977), head coach for Wright State Raiders men's basketball 2010–16
- Han Chae-young (born 1980), actress who primarily stars in South Korean television dramas
- Luol Deng (born 1985), small forward for NBA's Chicago Bulls
- Stephen S. Gregory Jr. (1888–1964), investment advisor and ornithologist
- Tappan Gregory (1886–1961), lawyer (head of the American Bar Association) and naturalist
- Anne Henning (born 1955), Olympic speed skater, 1972 gold medalist
- Dianne Holum (born 1951), Olympic speed skater, 1972 gold medalist
- John Hughes (1950–2009), film director and screenwriter
- Kaskade (born 1971), professional DJ
- Ken Goldstein (born 1969), documentary director; writer; musician, author of "The Way of the Nerd" book series
- Krewella, EDM group
- Jason Kipnis (born 1987), second baseman for MLB's Chicago Cubs
- Jayson Megna (born 1990), right wing for NHL's Vancouver Canucks
- Pat Misch (born 1981), pitcher for MLB's San Francisco Giants, New York Mets
- John Park (born 1988), former American Idol contestant; currently active as a musician in South Korea
- Kathy Parker (born 1943), Illinois state senator
- Scott Sanderson (1955–2019), pitcher with several MLB teams
- Jon Scheyer (born 1987), American-Israeli All-American basketball player for national champion 2009–10 Duke basketball team, Current head coach for the Duke Blue Devil’s men’s basketball team, also played for Maccabi Tel Aviv
- Johnny Suh (born 1995), K-pop artist, member of the K-pop groups NCT 127 and NCT

== Sister cities ==
Northbrook became sister cities with Diegem, Belgium, in 1966.

== See also ==
- Cook County, Illinois
- List of municipalities in Illinois
- Index of Illinois-related articles
