= Mike Mangione =

- Born: Michael Anthony Mangione; Des Plaines, IL
- Origin: Illinois, United States
- Genres: Folk
- Occupations: Singer-songwriter, instrumentalist
- Instruments: Guitar; percussion
- Years active: (2005 –present)
- Labels: RODZINKArecords, Spectra Records
- Website: www.mikemangione.com

Mike Mangione is an American singer-songwriter, guitarist, and percussionist. He currently performs both as a soloist and with a band. Mike often plays with his brother, Tom Mangione. Tom plays electric guitar. The brothers are originally from Chicago, though Mike has spent most of his adult life in Wisconsin. Both Mike and Tom play guitar left handed and upside-down. A unique characteristic that adds to their playing style and sound. Mike toured with his band Mike Mangione & The Union from 2007 - 2013. Their last record, Red-Winged Blackbird Man, received four stars from American Songwriter magazine. Mike then formed Mike Mangione & The Kin, with his brother Tom, Chauntee Ross (Violin) and Monique Ross (Cello), currently of SistaStrings and Brandi Carlile, from 2015 - 2020. The band was named "Kin" after the two sets of siblings, making up the core component. They released one album, "But I've Seen The Stars" in 2018, recorded at historic United Western Recorders which received favorable press. Mike's most recent release, "Blood & Water" released October 21, 2022 on RODZINKArecords. The album was later picked up for re-release March 24, 2024 by Spectra Records. Blood & water was recorded at Milan Hill Studios, in upstate NY and produced by three-time Grammy Award winner Larry Campbell (Bob Dylan, Levon Helm) and his fellow three-time Grammy award winning engineer and percussionist Justin Guip (Hot Tuna, Levon Helm). The album includes Mike's brother, Tom Mangione, on guitar alongside veteran and current Lumineers bass player, Byron Isaacs

He has released six LP records and two EP. In 2017 Mike released the "Three Days EP" which featured a cover of Peter Gabriel's "Don't Give Up" as a duet with fellow Wisconsin native Peter Mulvey. Mike's Fifth studio record "But I've Seen The Stars" was recorded at Ocean Way Recording with producer Matt Linesch (Edward Sharpe and the Magnetic Zeros, Dave Mason) and premiered in Relix Magazine. The album was released October 20, 2017 on Mike's own label "RODZINKArecords" and was named one of the best records of 2017 by Milwaukee Journal Sentinel.

Mike Mangione had a non-speaking role as "Mail Boy" in the 2004 movie Anchorman: The Legend of Ron Burgundy. The money made from his work on the movie financed his first tour. Mike also does voiceover work. In 2016 and 2017 Mike lent his voice for multiple Milwaukee Brewers commercials, one of which won the Emmy Award.

He was also the host of the podcast Time & The Mystery: Conversations with Mike Mangione, in which he sits with public figures to discuss their inspiration, process, and connection with others through their work.

Mike contributed a chapter of reflection for the book "God Is Beauty: A Retreat on The Gospel and Art" published by Theology of the Body Press in 2021. The book translated and published for the first time a 1962 retreat given by Karol Wojtyla (Pope John Paul II) for artists.

== Education ==
Mike Mangione graduated from Glenbrook South High School in Glenview, IL where he played drums and sang in multiple bands. One band was fronted by classmate turned actor Sam Witwer. He went on to study Urban and Environmental Affairs and graduate from Marquette University

== Personal life ==
Mangione grew up in Glenview, Illinois, a northern suburb of Chicago. Currently lives in Wisconsin with his wife and three children. He is Catholic.
