= Northbrook station =

Commuter rail station in Northbrook, Illinois, US

Northbrook

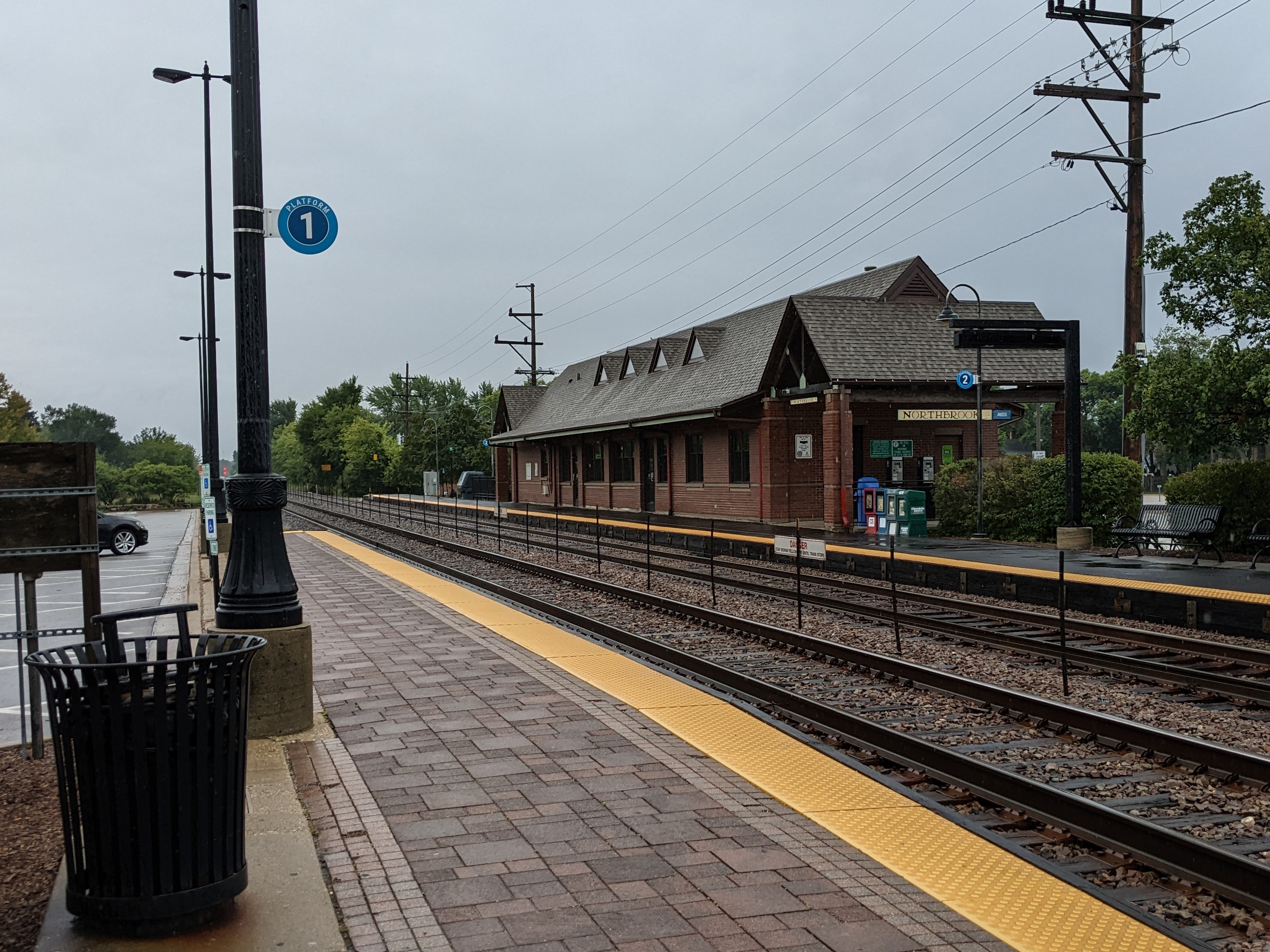
- Northbrook station in September 2022

General information
- Location: 1401 Shermer Road; Northbrook, Illinois 60062; United States
- Coordinates: 42.1268°N 87.8279°W
- Owner: Metra
- Line: C&M Subdivision
- Platforms: 2 side platforms
- Tracks: 2
- Connections: Pace Bus

Construction
- Structure type: At Grade
- Platform levels: 1
- Parking: Yes
- Cycle facilities: Yes
- Accessible: Yes

Other information
- Fare zone: 3

History
- Rebuilt: 1967, 1990 (current station)
- Former names: Shermer, Shermerville

Passengers
- 2018: 1,259 (average weekday) ▼9.6%
- Rank: 28 out of 236

Services
Preceding station	Metra	Following station
Lake Cook Road toward Fox Lake	Milwaukee District North	The Glen/North Glenview toward Union Station
Former services
Preceding station	Milwaukee Road	Following station
Deerfield toward Milwaukee	Chicago – Milwaukee	Techny toward Chicago
Deerfield toward Walworth	Suburban Service North Line	Techny toward Chicago
Track layout
Location

Northbrook is a commuter railroad station on Metra's Milwaukee District North Line in Northbrook, Illinois. The station is located at 1401 Shermer Road, is 21.0 miles (33.8 km) away from Chicago Union Station, the southern terminus of the line, and serves commuters between Union Station and Fox Lake, Illinois. In Metra's zone-based fare system, Northbrook is in zone 3. As of 2018, Northbrook is the 28th busiest of Metra's 236 non-downtown stations, with an average of 1,259 weekday boardings. Metra trains pass through about every hour in each direction outside of rush hours, and up to every 20 minutes during rush hour. Bike racks are available at the station, on either side of the tracks. The tracks that run through Northbrook are also utilized by Amtrak's Hiawatha, Borealis and Empire Builder, as well as freight trains.

As of June 3, 2024, Northbrook is a scheduled stop for all Metra service on the line (27 trains in each direction on weekdays, 10 on Saturdays, and nine on Sundays and holidays).

Northbrook station was originally built by the Chicago, Milwaukee, St. Paul and Pacific Railroad. Parking is available both on Shermer Road and Lorenz Drive.

== Bus connections ==
Pace

- 422 Linden CTA/Glenview/Northbrook Court (weekdays only)
