= Northbrook/Glenview School District 30 =

School district in Cook County, Illinois, United States

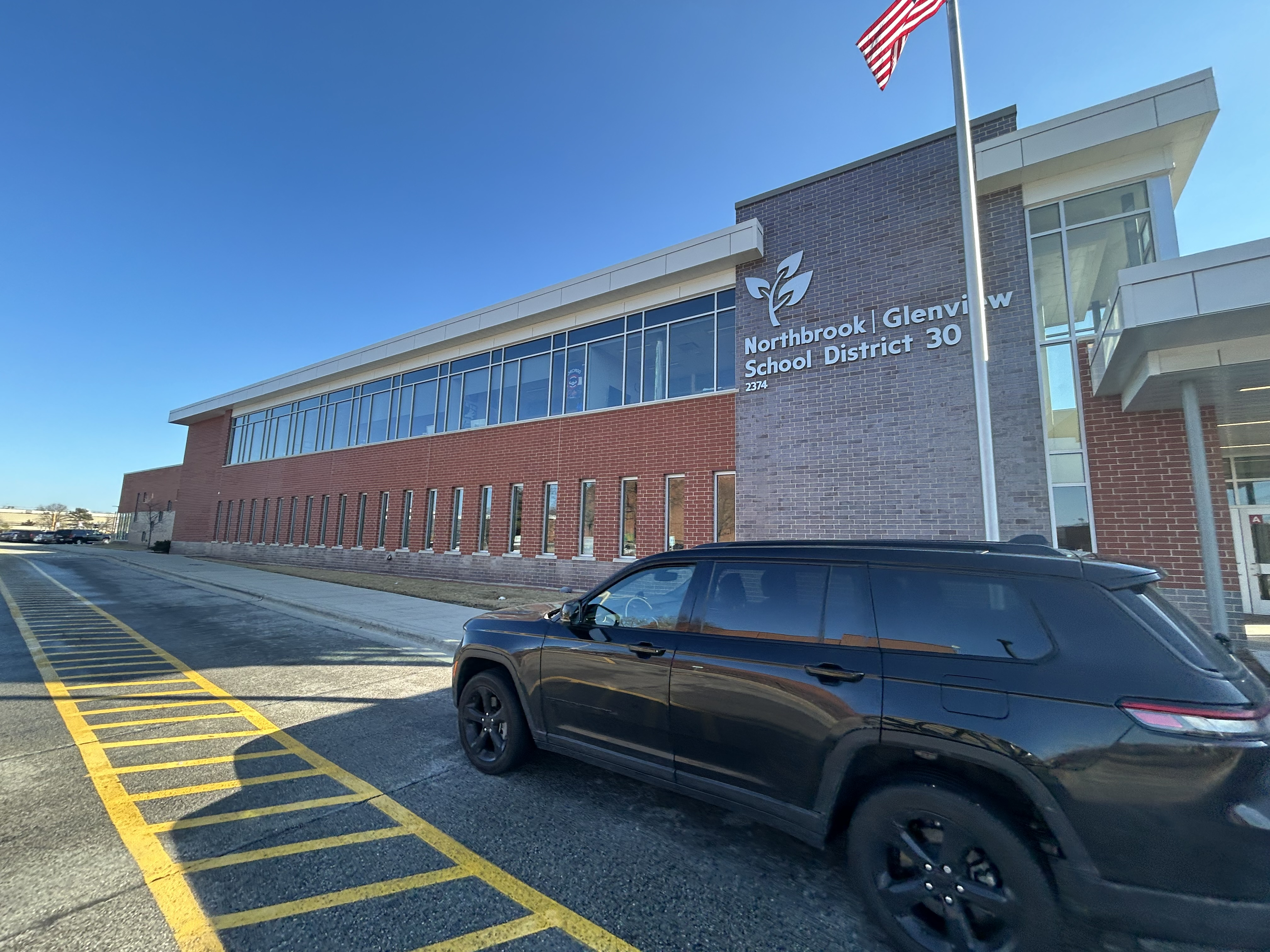
- The district office, located within Maple School
- 2374 Shermer Road Northbrook, Illinois

District information
- Grades: K-8
- Established: 1860; 166 years ago
- Superintendent: Dr. Emily K. Tammauru
- Asst. superintendent(s): Dr. Melissa Hirsch
- Schools: 3

Students and staff
- Enrollment: 1239 (2024)
- Teachers: 116 (2024)
- Student–teacher ratio: 13.4:1 (2024)
- Colors: Red, Blue, And Green

Other information
- Website: district30.org

Northbrook/Glenview School District 30 is a school district with schools located in Northbrook, Illinois and Glenview, Illinois, suburbs of Chicago.

== History ==
Northbrook/Glenview School District 30 was initially formulated around 1860. Wescott School opened in 1957, with Willowbrook School opening in 1969. Maple School was completely rebuilt in the late 2010s. Both Wescott and Willowbrook Schools had remodeling done to parts of the buildings in the early 2020s.

== Schools ==
=== Maple School ===
Maple School

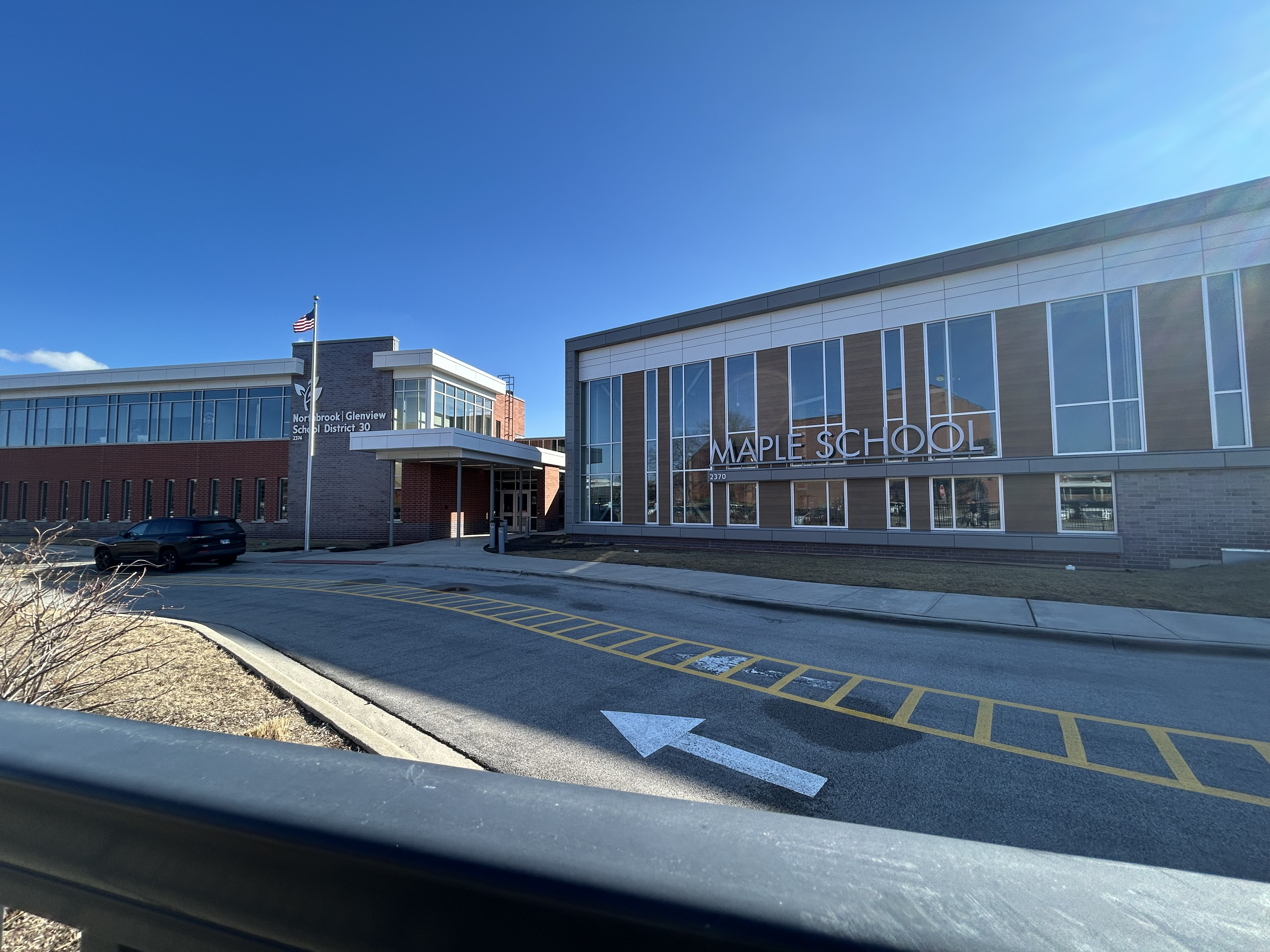
- Front of the School, seen from Sherman Dr

Location
- 2370 Shermer Rd; Northbrook, Illinois

Information
- School type: Middle School
- Opened: 1860
- Principal: Sam Kurtz
- Assistant Principal: Angela Jaeger
- Grades: 6-8
- Enrollment: 429 (2024)
- Student to teacher ratio: 12:1 (2024)
- Colors: Blue and Orange
- Athletics conference: Central Suburban League
- Mascot: Manny the Mustang
- Feeder schools: Wescott and Willowbrook elementary schools
- Feeder to: Glenbrook North or Glenbrook South high schools
- Alumni: Jason Kipnis, Jon Scheyer

In 1860, the original Maple School was opened upon the creation of the district. The original school was located across Shermer Rd from the current location. In 1949, a new building was built on the property of the current school, where the athletic field is currently located. Multiple expansions were put on the building up until the early 2000s. However, in the 2010s it was deemed a replacement building was needed. Thus, a replacement school was built from 2018-2019 on the site of the former athletic field and district office. The new building was designed by ARCON and built by Nicholas & Associates for $40.6 Million.

Maple is also the location of District 30's offices, which were located in a separate building, prior to the new school’s construction. This is also the location of the district’s summer school program, which is open to grades Pre-K to 8.

Maple School has won two Blue Ribbon awards, including one in 2021. Notable alumni of the school include Jason Kipnis and Jon Scheyer. Most graduates continue to Glenbrook North if they live in Northbrook, or Glenbrook South if they live in Glenview.

=== Wescott School ===
Wescott School

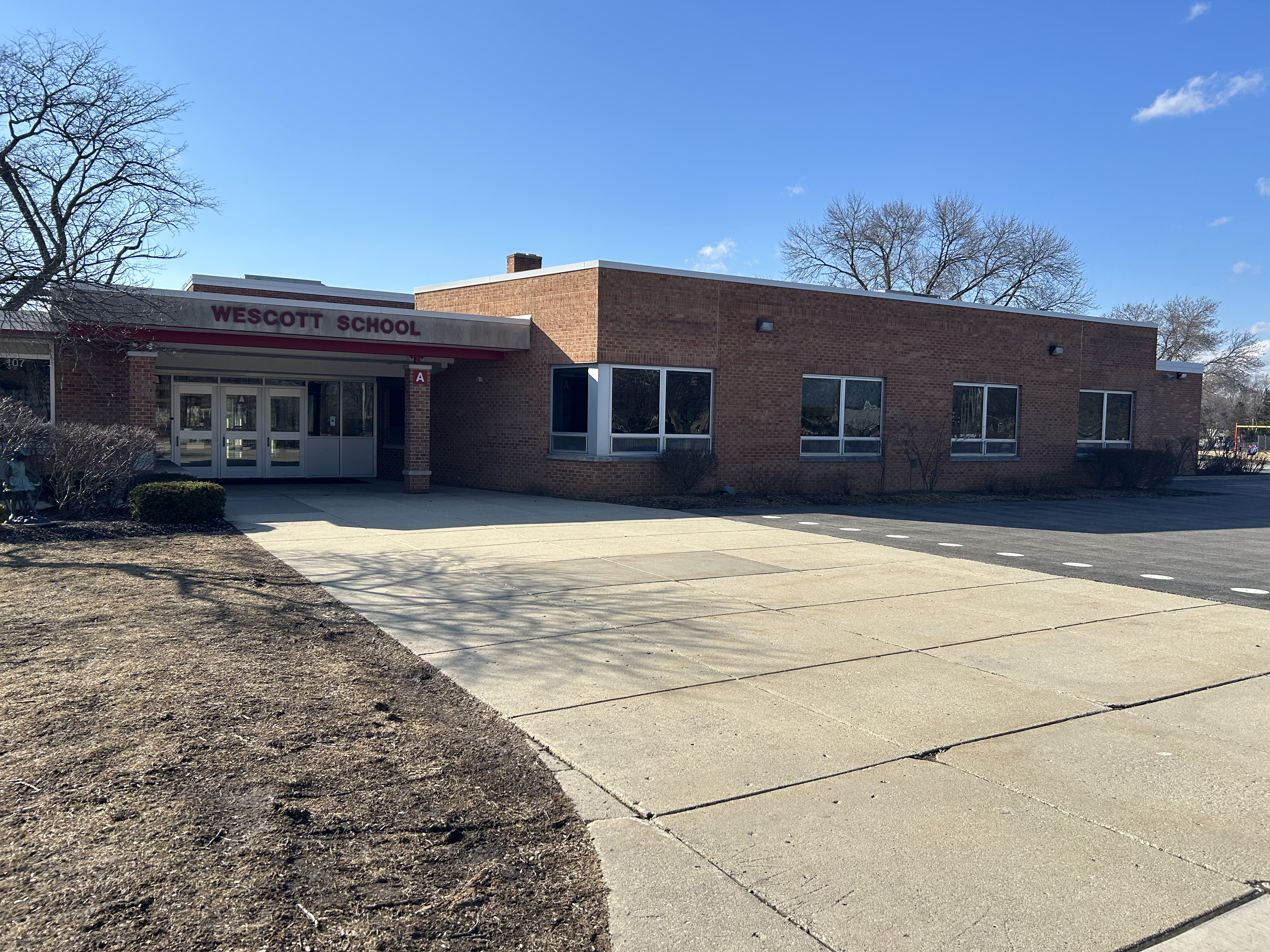
- The front entrance to the school

Location
- 1820 Western Ave; Northbrook, Illinois

Information
- School type: Elementary School
- Opened: 1957
- Principal: Christopher Brown
- Assistant Principal: Alison Keller
- Grades: K-5
- Enrollment: 485 (2024)
- Student to teacher ratio: 15:1 (2024)
- Colors: Red and White
- Mascot: Wolves
- Feeder to: Maple School

Wescott School opened in 1957, with many expansions being put on the building in the 1960s, '70s and late '90s to accommodate growing population in the area. In 2021, the building had a large expansion including a new gymnasium, music and art rooms, as well as additional classroom spaces. The school has been awarded many Blue Ribbon awards including one in 2022.

=== Willowbrook School ===
Willowbrook School

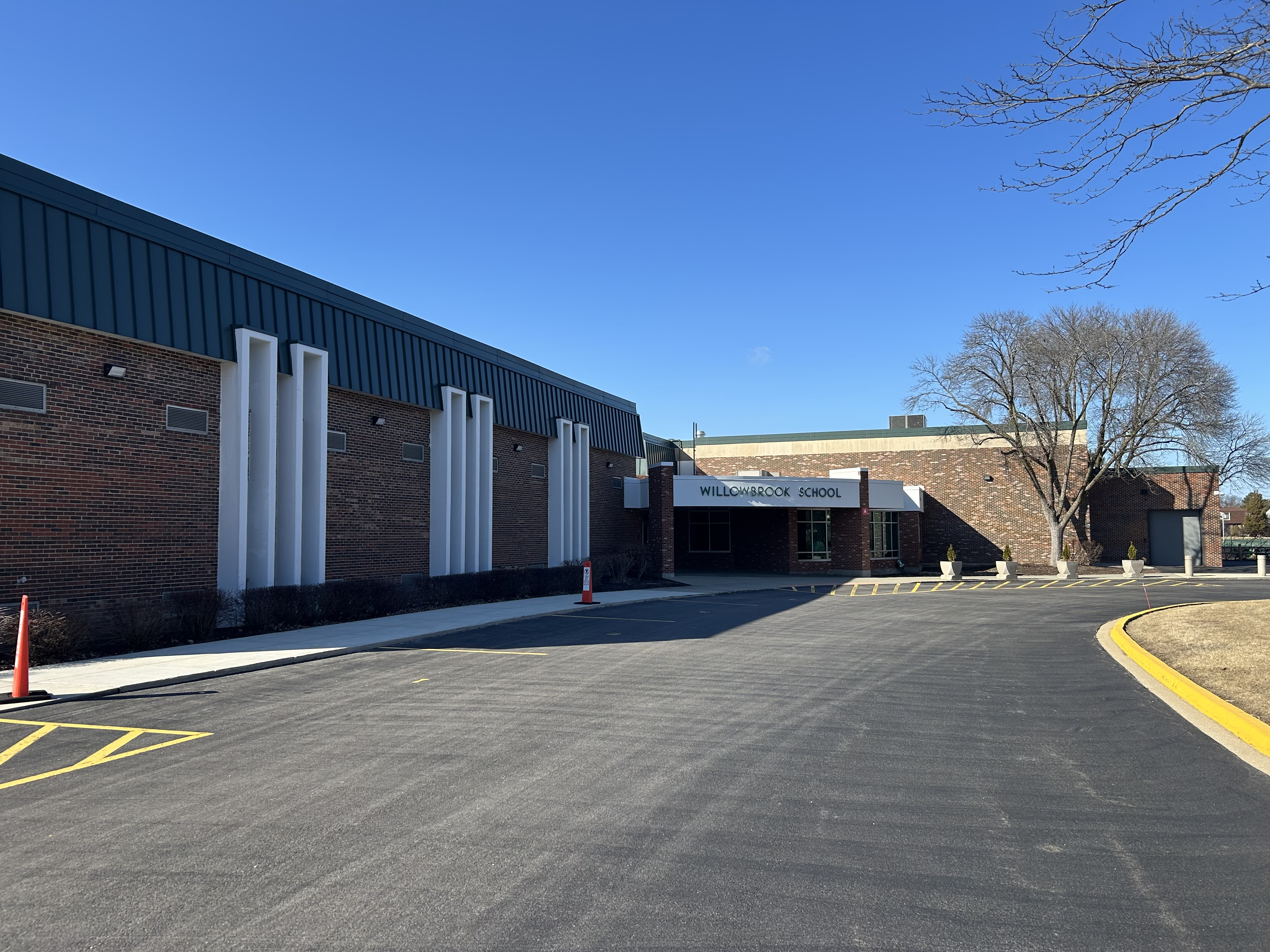
- The front entrance to the school, as seen from Happy Hollow Rd

Location
- 2500 Happy Hollow Rd; Glenview, Illinois

Information
- School type: Elementary School
- Opened: 1969
- Principal: Katie Compagno
- Assistant Principal: Erik Brekke
- Grades: PK-5
- Enrollment: 325 (2024)
- Student to teacher ratio: 14:1 (2024)
- Colors: Green and Yellow
- Mascot: Wildcats
- Feeder to: Maple School

Willowbrook School opened in 1969. The school was built to accommodate Wescott, as there was a large amount of growth in the Glenview portion of the district. In 2021, the library was renovated, amongst other smaller renovations.

== Lew Blond Run ==
The district annually holds the Lew Blond Run. The event consists of a 5K run and a 1 Mile run/walk, as well as a 50yd dash for children (named Little Lew). The event honors a former teacher who worked at Maple named Lew Blond who died from ALS in 2000. The run starts and ends at Maple traversing neighborhoods of the district. The event has raised over $500,000 since it started in 2001.
