= Ed Rudolph Velodrome =

Velodrome located in Northbrook, Illinois

- Interactive map of Ed Rudolph Velodrome
- Location: 1479 Maple Ave Northbrook, IL 60062
- Coordinates: 42°7′24.86″N 87°49′6.27″W
- Owned by: Northbrook Park District
- Date opened: 1960; 66 years ago

The Ed Rudolph Velodrome is a velodrome in Northbrook, Illinois used to host track cycling events and soccer games. It was the more centrally located of two Chicago metropolitan area velodromes (the other residing in Kenosha, Wisconsin), until the Chicago Velo Campus was constructed in 2011. It is owned by the Northbrook Park District.

The 382 m (1,253 ft) velodrome was constructed in 1960 with a perimeter for track cycling and a grassy infield for soccer games. Every winter, the velodrome was flooded to create a speed skating rink. Over the years, the track served as a practice rink for members of multiple U.S. Winter Olympics teams. In the 1990s, the District ceased the annual conversion of the velodrome into an ice rink due to the facility's inability to retain water, which seeped through the soccer field. Ed Harvey, the District director, attributed this to a lowering of the water table caused by construction in the late 1980s.

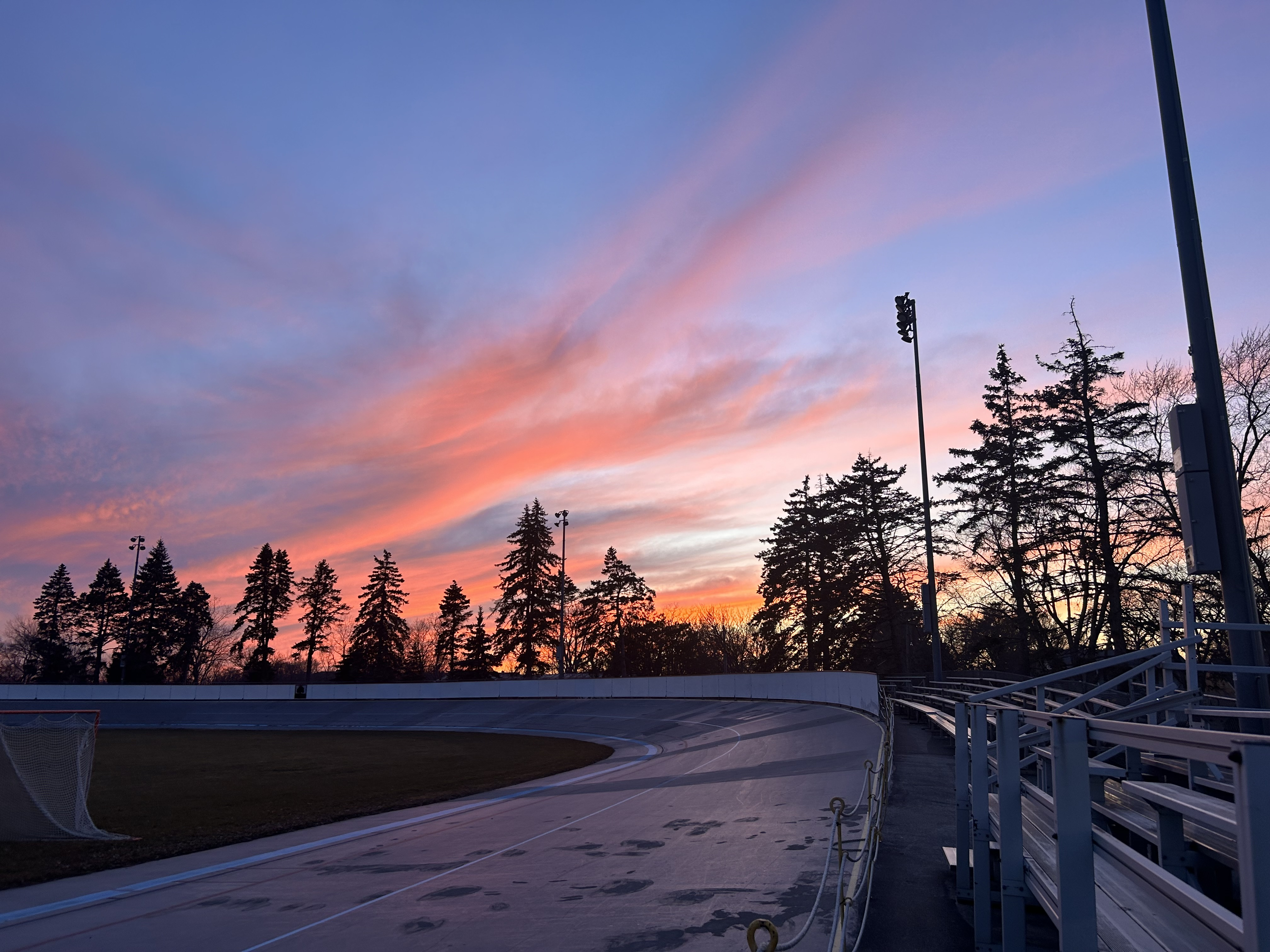
Velodrome at night

The track's asphalt was completely resurfaced in 1989, and again in 2004.

== See also ==
- List of cycling tracks and velodromes
