= Northbrook Public Library =

Library in Northbrook, Illinois, US

Coordinates: 42°7′45″N 87°50′27″W

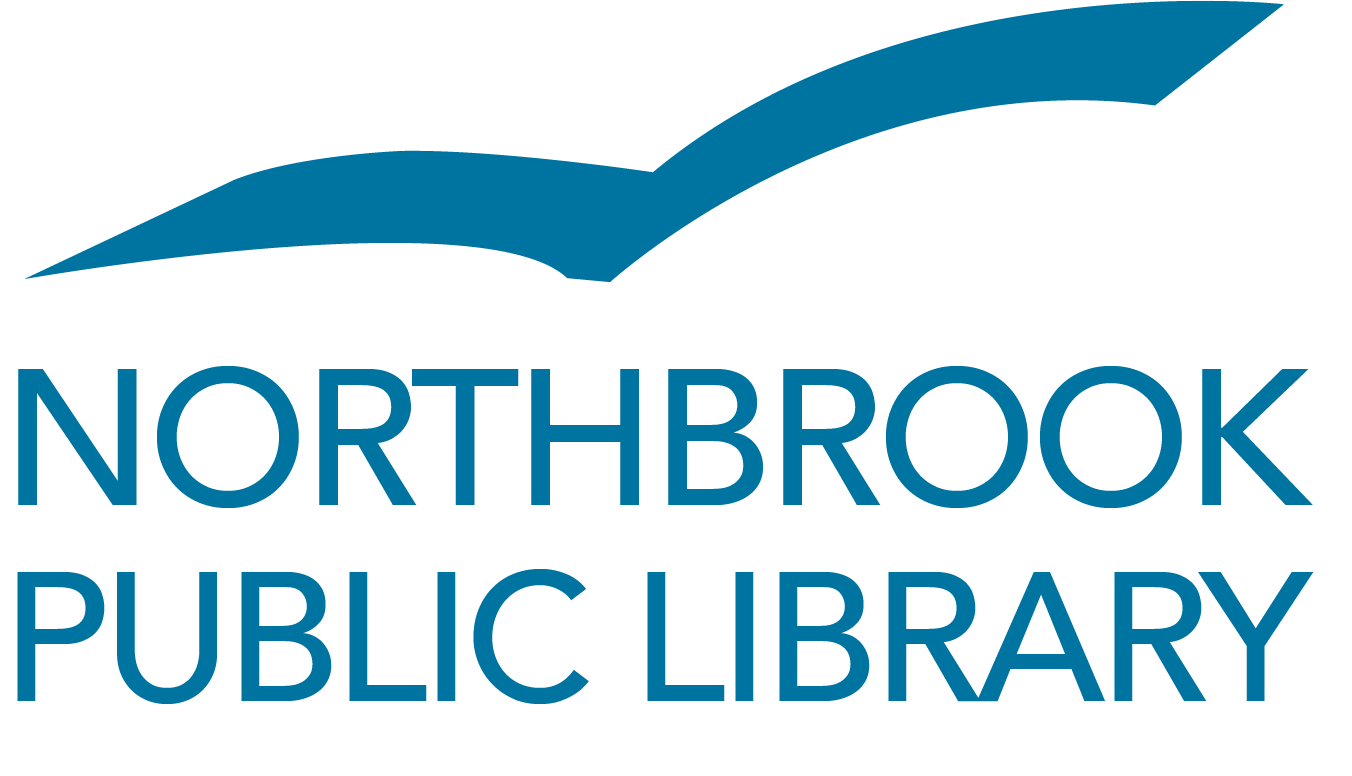

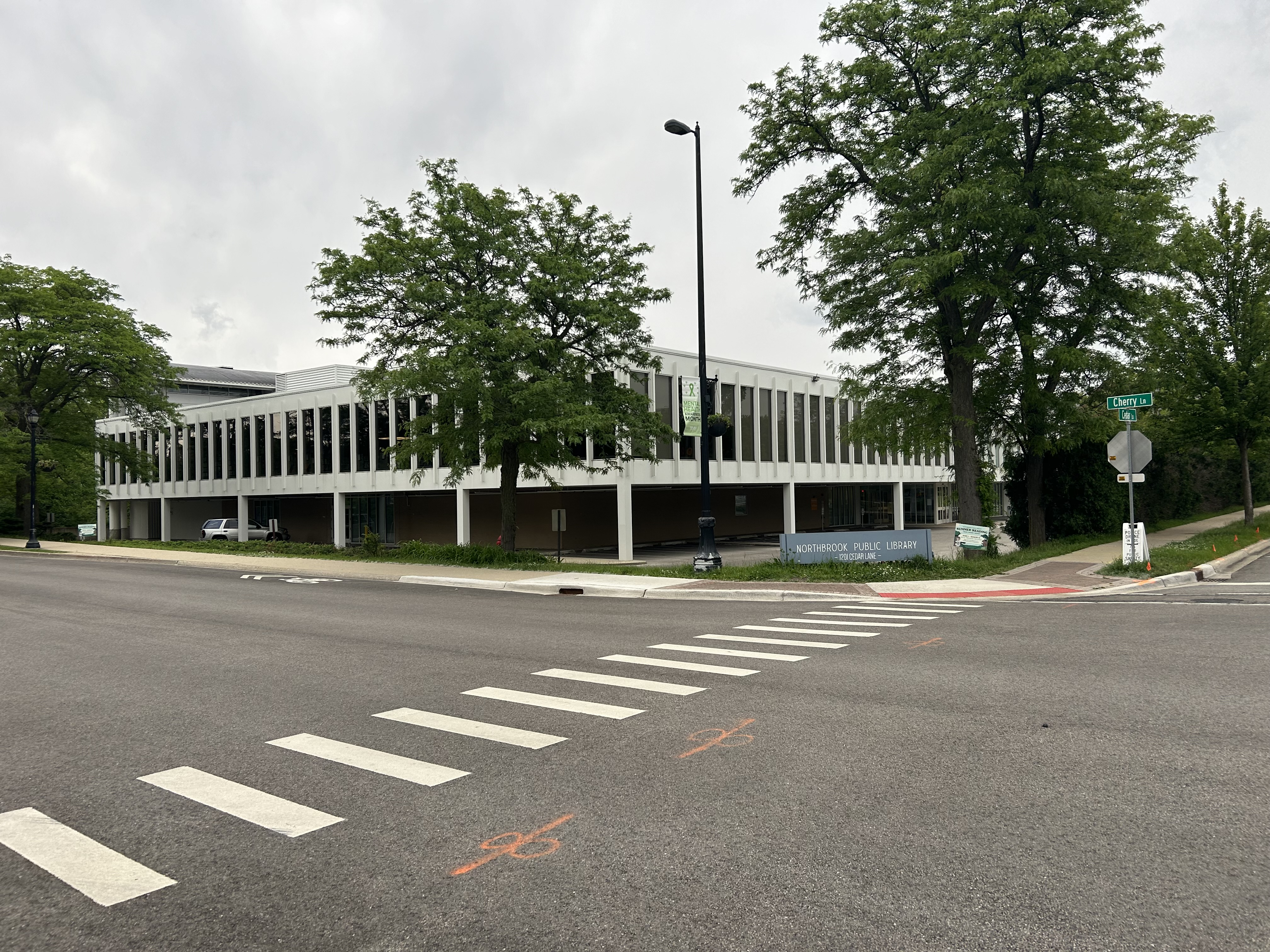
- The library as seen from Cherry Lane
- Location: 1201 Cedar Ln, Northbrook, Illinois, US, 60062
- Type: Public
- Established: 1952
- Branches: 1

Collection
- Size: 337,300 (2012)

Access and use
- Circulation: 856,000 (2012)
- Population served: 35,222 (2020)

Other information
- Budget: $9,111,049 (2022)
- Director: Kate Hall
- Employees: Approx. 108 (2022)
- Website: www.northbrook.info

The Northbrook Public Library, located at 1201 Cedar Lane, serves the 35,222 residents of the Village of Northbrook, Illinois. The library received 237,708 visitors and circulated 737,708 items from its collection of 239,294 books, audio materials, and videos in 2023. Library Journal gave the Northbrook Public Library its highest rating of 5 stars in 2012, 2013, 2019, 2020, 2021, and 2022 based on circulation, visits, program attendance and public internet use per capita.

== History ==
The Northbrook Public Library first opened on June 30, 1952, following a referendum spearheaded by Bertram Pollak, president of the Northbrook Civic Association, C. E. Barthel, Jr., who became the library board president, and Carolyn A. Landwehr, who became the library board secretary. The library was originally housed in meeting and office space at the village hall (now the Northbrook Civic Foundation building) with a capacity for 6,500 volumes. Freda Thorson was the first librarian. In 1953, the Northbrook Civic Association provided funds of $27,500 to build a new, one-story library at the corner of Shermer and Church Street that could accommodate 12,000 volumes. The new library was dedicated on March 21, 1954.

By 1967, the library had exceeded its capacity with a collection of 31,000 volumes, and voters approved a referendum for a new building at the library's current location at the corner of Cedar and Cherry, on the bank of the West Fork of the North Branch of the Chicago River. The library was designed by the architecture firm of Hammond and Roesch and cost $1 million. The new steel frame building had 28,000 square feet of floor space and room for 110,000 volumes. The main part of the library was on a single floor raised above ground level to provide views and to protect the collection from the river flooding. The design earned a Distinguished Building Award from the Chicago Chapter of the American Institute of Architects. Opening day was May 25, 1969.

The library building has undergone two major expansions. In 1999, a $10.5 million addition gave the library a new third floor—housing the fiction and multimedia collections—as well as an enlarged children's department, study rooms, classrooms, and banks of computer terminals on the second floor. In 2014, a $6.5 million construction project began to renovate the first floor meeting rooms and create a modern auditorium with tiered seating.

In 2021 the main lobby was remodeled with a new mural, new self checkout machines, a new automated sorting machines, and many more new upgrades.
