= West Northfield School District 31 =

School district in Illinois, United States

Address
- 3131 Techny Rd Northbrook, Cook County, Illinois, 60062-5857; United States

District information
- Type: Primary
- Grades: PK-8
- Superintendent: Erin Murphy
- School board: 7
- Schools: 2
- NCES District ID: 1741700
- District ID: IL-05-016-0310-02

Students and staff
- Students: 1,010
- Faculty: 99 (on an FTE basis)
- Student–teacher ratio: 10.20:1

Other information
- Website: www.district31.net

West Northfield School District 31 is an elementary school district with schools located in Northbrook and Glenview, Illinois, United States. Stanley Field Middle School, as well as Winkelman School, were known for their blue ribbon in 2003.

== Governance ==
West Northfield School District 31 follows a council-manager government where seven Board of Education members are elected and appoint a superintendent to run day-to-day district operations. The seven board members are Allison Slade Rothstein (President), Nick Parfitt (Vice-President), Meghan McMillin, Sakina Kadakia, Megan Kivarkis, Stella McNeilly, and Noah Frank. The current superintendent is Erin K. Murphy who was the former principal for Stanley Field Middle School.

== Schools ==
West Northfield School District 31 operates two elementary schools.

=== Henry Winkelman Elementary School ===
Winkelman School was named after Henry Winkelman, the original janitor.

=== Stanley Field Middle School ===
Field School was named after Stanley Field, the nephew of Marshall Field.
