= Northbrook School District 28 =

School district in Illinois, United States

Address
- 1475 Maple Ave Northbrook, Cook County, Illinois, 60062-5418; United States

District information
- Type: Public school district
- Grades: PK-8
- Superintendent: Jason Pearson
- School board: 7
- Schools: 4
- NCES District ID: 1728980
- District ID: IL-05-016-0280-02

Students and staff
- Students: 1,842
- Teachers: 187.40 (on an FTE basis)
- Staff: 215.04 (on an FTE basis)
- Student–teacher ratio: 9.83:1

Other information
- Website: www.northbrook28.net

Northbrook School District 28 is an elementary school district situated in Northbrook, Illinois, United States.

== Schools ==
- Westmoor Elementary School – Grades PK-5
- Greenbriar Elementary School – Grades KG-5
- Meadowbrook Elementary School – Grades KG-5
- Northbrook Junior High School – Grades 6-8

== Westmoor Elementary School ==
Westmoor is a school that goes from preschool to 5th grade. It is located on Cherry Lane. It went under construction starting in 2014. The school first started resorting to the 4-5th grade hallways. In the summer of 2014, they repainted all the walls and did not removed the carpet. This is because the carpets were moldy and would cause a problem later on. In late 2014, westmoor's principal, Dr. Finch, announced that the school would remake the playground. The back of the school was still under construction. As a result, the school had to put up fences for safety reasons. In the middle of 2015, they removed half of the playground to make room for a spider web and spin top. Construction finished the last week before the school year ended on June 5, 2015. The new preschool rooms on the east side are a significant addition to the school. It used to be a kindergarten class's playground and classrooms. The kindergartens now have two rooms on the other side of the building.

== Northbrook Junior High School ==
As of the 2022-23 school year, the school was teaching 631 students.
