= Northbrook School District 27 =

School district in Illinois, United States

Coordinates: 42°7′44.2″N 87°52′50.5″W

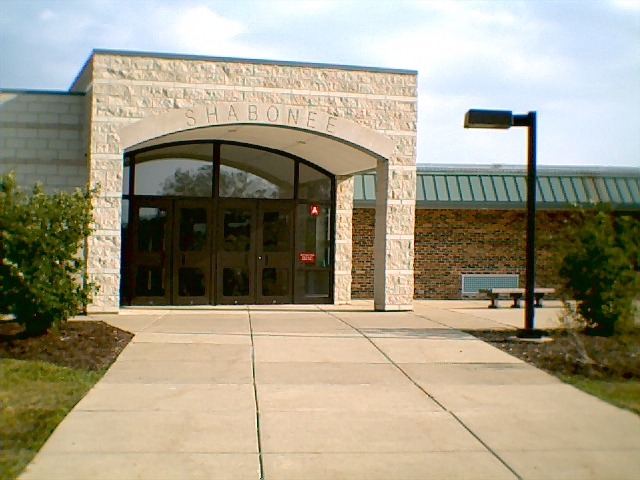
Shabonee Elementary School in Northbrook, Illinois

Northbrook School District 27 is a school district located in Northbrook, Illinois.

== Overview ==
The district consists of three schools: Hickory Point, Shabonee, and Wood Oaks Junior High School. The district used to have a fourth school, Grove, but it was shut down and destroyed in June 2010 after a decision by the board of education. Prior to that, there used to be a school called Indian Ridge, but this closed in 1982, with the building sold off to the Northbrook Park District, and now operates as the Northbrook Leisure Center. The district prides itself in providing students with many accommodations such as disabilities, or accelerated learning. As well as that, the district provides students with some of the newest technology, and students are provided with a Lenovo Chromebook in sixth grade to take home with them for schoolwork.

== Schools ==
- Hickory Point (Grades K-2)
- Shabonee (Grades 3–5)
- Wood Oaks Junior High School (Grades 6–8)
- Grove (closed in June 2010) (Grades K-3)
- Indian Ridge (closed in 1982)

== Board of education ==
As of 2018, the Board of Education has seven members as follows.

- Helen Melnick, Board President
- Laurie Garber-Amram, Board Vice President
- Melissa Copeland
- Ed Feld
- Alex Frum
- Brian Paich
- Martha Carlos

== Superintendents ==
- David Kroeze (Superintendent)
- Theresa Fournier (Assistant Superintendent for Personnel and Student Services)
- Katharine Olson (Assistant Superintendent for Curriculum, Instruction & Assessment)
- Kimberly Arakelian (Assistant Superintendent for Finance & Operations)

== Principals ==
- Wood Oaks - Cari Beake
- Shabonee - John Panozzo
- Hickory Point - Maureen Deely

== Assistant Principals ==
- Hickory Point - Meggan Buchanan
- Shabonee - Meggan Buchanan
- Wood Oaks - Paul Saminski
