= Glenbrook South High School =

Public school in Glenview, Illinois, US

Location
- 4000 W. Lake Avenue; Glenview, Illinois 60026; United States; 42.08950°N 87.85226°W

Information
- School type: Public, Secondary
- Opened: 1962
- School district: Northfield Township High School District 225
- NCES District ID: 1729010
- Superintendent: R.J. Gravel
- NCES School ID: 172901003043
- Principal: Barbara Georges
- Grades: 9-12
- Gender: Coed
- Enrollment: 2,923 (2024–2025)
- Campus type: Suburban
- Colors: Navy; Gold
- Athletics conference: Central Suburban League
- Mascot: Tommy the Titan
- Team name: Titans
- Publication: Calliope
- Newspaper: Oracle
- Yearbook: Etruscan
- Website: Official Site

Glenbrook South High School, or GBS, is a public four-year high school located in Glenview, Illinois, a north suburb of Chicago, in the United States. It is part of Northfield Township High School District 225, which also includes Glenbrook North High School.

Feeder schools that attend GBS are Attea, Springman, Field (Glenview portions), and Maple (Glenview portions). According to state standardized test scores, 29% of students are at least proficient in math and 40% in reading, as tested by the Illinois State Board of Education. These figures indicate that the school's performance is above the state high school median of 24% proficiency in Math and Reading.

== History ==
Glenbrook South High School was established in 1962, due to overcrowding at Glenbrook High School, which was then renamed to Glenbrook North High School.

Glenbrook South High School underwent a significant expansion in 2002, adding dozens of classrooms, revamping the music and performing art facilities, and reconfiguring the parking lots and athletics fields. During the summer of 2007, Glenbrook South updated six science classrooms from the 1960s and reconfigured two others to create full-size science classrooms. The Dean's Office, and Student Activities Office were also renovated. A new Food Court was constructed along with a Student Activities Center that was created by reconfiguring the faculty lounge. Construction at GBS was completed with the addition of a practice gym, which increased PE capacity and a new pool with handicapped access, eight lane capacity and a diving depth of fourteen feet. A new fitness center opened in May 2008 and the former weight room was converted into two health classrooms, a driver education classroom and a Health/Driver Education office. The fieldhouse floor was installed in 2011, along with the school bathrooms renovation. In 2017, A new gym floor was installed replacing the old one. In 2019, GBS renovated several classrooms and replaced the fire alarm system (This process was completed in 2021). Several new classrooms, including all the science labs, gymnasium basketball hoops, wrestling mats, and the athletic bathrooms have been remodeled in the 2022-2023 year. In the 2024-2025 year, thermostats have been replaced, revamped in the parking lot, remodeled more bathrooms and added all-gender bathrooms. Communication was improved by adding new zoom phones in classrooms. A new woodshop was introduced after a fire the year prior, followed by a new bookstore and SRT classrooms. The Glenbrook Health Center was opened to accommodate students from either GBS or GBN. Today, Glenbrook South High School, along with Glenbrook North, are noted for their outstanding curriculum and quality of education, having been repeatedly named to a variety of best-in-the-nation lists. For example, as part of the First in the World Consortium, GBS and GBN students scored first in the world in international math & science testing.

== Academics ==
In 2008, Glenbrook South had an average composite ACT score of 24.3, and graduated 99.6% of its senior class. Glenbrook South did not make Adequate Yearly Progress on the Prairie State Achievement Examination, a state test part of the No Child Left Behind Act.

According to 2019 statistics, Glenbrook South was ranked 17th in terms of the best public high schools in the state of Illinois.

Of the roughly 3000 students who attend GBS, roughly 42% are from minority groups. Students represent these categories: 2.4% African American, 11.3% Hispanic, 0.1% American Indian, 18.1% Asian, 65.2% White, 22.1% financially disadvantaged students. Students have a State Test Performance Index of 97.9 and a Poverty-Adjustment Performance Index of 1.55. The Disadvantaged Students' State Test Proficiency Rate is 38.3 with a Disadvantaged Students Performance Gap of 11.0, while the Non-disadvantaged Students' State Test Proficiency Rate is 71.6 and Current State Test Achievement Gap is 33.3. In College-Ready Student Performance, the College Readiness Index is 43.5, participation rate is 46.8%, Quality Adjusted Participation rate is 42.4%, Participant Passing Rate is 90.6%, and Exam Passing rate is 92.0%. Advanced Placement student performance is reflected in an AP Participation Rate of 46.8%, a Quality Adjusted Participation rate of 42.4%, a Participant Passing Rate of 90.6%, and Exam Passing rate of 92.0%.

The Federal No Child Left Behind Act as applied in Illinois requires 100% of students to meet standards on the Prairie State Achievement Exam by 2013. Glenbrook South High School continues to focus curricular efforts on academic growth for each student. These efforts focus on the meaningful implementation of the College Readiness Standards from ACT.

== Student life ==
=== Athletics ===
Glenbrook South is a member of the Central Suburban League. GBS is also a member of the Illinois High School Association (IHSA), the organization that sponsors most sports and activities in Illinois.

GBS sponsors interscholastic teams for young men and women in basketball, cross country, golf, gymnastics, soccer, swimming, fencing, diving, tennis, track & field, volleyball, and water polo. Men may compete in baseball, football, and wrestling. Women may compete in badminton, softball, poms and cheerleading. While not sponsored by the IHSA, the school also sponsors teams for men and women in lacrosse, in addition to a women's field hockey team.

The following teams have won state championships:

- Basketball (girls): 1993–94
- Golf (boys): 1967–68
- Volleyball (boys): 2002–03
- Lacrosse (boys): 1999–2000 (Illinois High School Lacrosse Association)
- Field Hockey: 2023-2024

=== Activities ===
GBS sponsors a number of activities for students ranging from cultural and artistic to academic and social welfare. The list changes from year to year depending on student interest, though the current list can be found here.

Among the more nationally recognizable clubs are Debate, Juggling Club and LiNK (Liberty in North Korea). There is also a chapter of Amnesty International.

The following activities won their respective IHSA sponsored state tournament or competition:

- Debate: 1973, 1989, 2000, 2005, 2006, 2008; National Champions 1981, 1998, 2005, 2006, 2008, National Runners-up 2013, National Champions 2014
- Individual Events: 2003, 2006

Glenbrook South was also named the 2008 National GRAMMY Signature School for its music program. Glenbrook South was also awarded the 2009-2010 David P. Baker Cup by the National Debate Coaches Association for having the #1 ranked debate team in the nation during the competitive season. The debate team won the national title in 2014, was the national runner-up in 2013 and placed third at the national championships in 2012.

Glenbrook South has a nationally ranked yearbook that consistently wins awards from major publishing organizations like the National Scholastic Press Association (NSPA), the Columbia Scholastic Press Association (CSPA), as well as the Illinois Journalism Education Association (IJEA).

== Glenbrook Academy of International Studies ==
The Glenbrook Academy of International Studies is a four-year program with students from Glenbrook North and Glenbrook South High Schools. Around 30 freshmen a year elect to attend Academy classes. Founded in 1981 to give students a more unorthodox learning perspective, it covers English, Social Studies, and a foreign language. Each class learns a different foreign language from a rotation of four: Spanish, French, German, and Mandarin Chinese. The curriculums for the English and Social Studies departments are complex and challenging, aimed to broaden students' critical thinking capabilities as well as understand in depth the complexities of history and the modern day.

== Notable alumni ==
The following are some of the notable alumni of Glenbrook South High School:

- Mark Gregory Hambley (1965) was a diplomat who served in numerous capacities, including Ambassador to Qatar and Lebanon.
- Flint Dille (1973) is a screenwriter, game designer, and novelist. His film work includes scripts for The Transformers: The Movie, and An American Tail: Fievel Goes West.
- Eric Gilliland (1980) is a television writer/producer of sitcoms that have included The Wonder Years, Who's the Boss, Roseanne, and My Boys.
- Steven Levitan (1980) is an Emmy Award-winning writer/producer of Frasier and creator of Just Shoot Me! and Modern Family.
- Daniel Ivankovich (1981) is a physician and musician.
- Laura Fine (1985) is a member of the Illinois Senate for the 9th District.
- Erick Anderson (1987), All-American linebacker for University of Michigan and player for NFL's Kansas City Chiefs and Washington Redskins.
- Mark Shapiro (1988) is a media executive
- Ravin Gandhi (1990) is an American businessman and the founder/CEO of GMM Nonstick Coatings.
- Emily Bergl (1993) is an actress most well known for her roles in The Rage: Carrie 2, Men In Trees, Shameless, Desperate Housewives, and Gilmore Girls.
- Eric Fensler (1993) creator of popular G.I. Joe parody PSAs and is a writer for Adult Swim's Tim and Eric Awesome Show, Great Job!.
- Sam Witwer (1996) is an actor known for roles in Smallville, The Mist and as Darth Vader's apprentice in Star Wars: The Force Unleashed.
- Kurt Anderson (1997), football player University of Michigan, coach for NFL's Buffalo Bills; currently offensive line coach for the Northwestern Wildcats.
- Han Chae-young (1997) is a Korean model and actress.
- Arian Moayed (1998) is a Tony Award-nominated actor and writer.
- Leonid Radvinsky (1998) was the Ukrainian-American owner of OnlyFans
- Mike Mangione (1998) is a touring singer-songwriter
- Patrick Stump (2002), lead singer, guitarist and composer for the Grammy-nominated rock band Fall Out Boy.
- Alice Lee (2007), actress
- Molly Yeh (2007), Food Network Show Host of “Girl Meets Farm”
- Lana Gehring (2009), short track speedskater; bronze medalist at 2010 Winter Olympics in Vancouver with 3000 m relay team.
- Jack Cooley (2009), basketball player for the Sacramento Kings and Utah Jazz.
- Brian Hansen (2009), speedskater, 2010 Winter Olympics, 18th in 1500m, silver medalist in team pursuit.
- John Splithoff (2009); musician known for 2016 Billboard top 10 hit "Sing To You"
- David Abidor (2010), soccer player
- Dan Chmielinski (2012), jazz double bassist
- Olivia Smoliga (2013), swimmer, 2016 Summer Olympics, 6th in 100m backstroke, gold medalist in 4 × 100 meter medley relay.
- Nick Martinelli (2022), basketball player
