= Niles Township, Illinois =

Niles Township
- Township
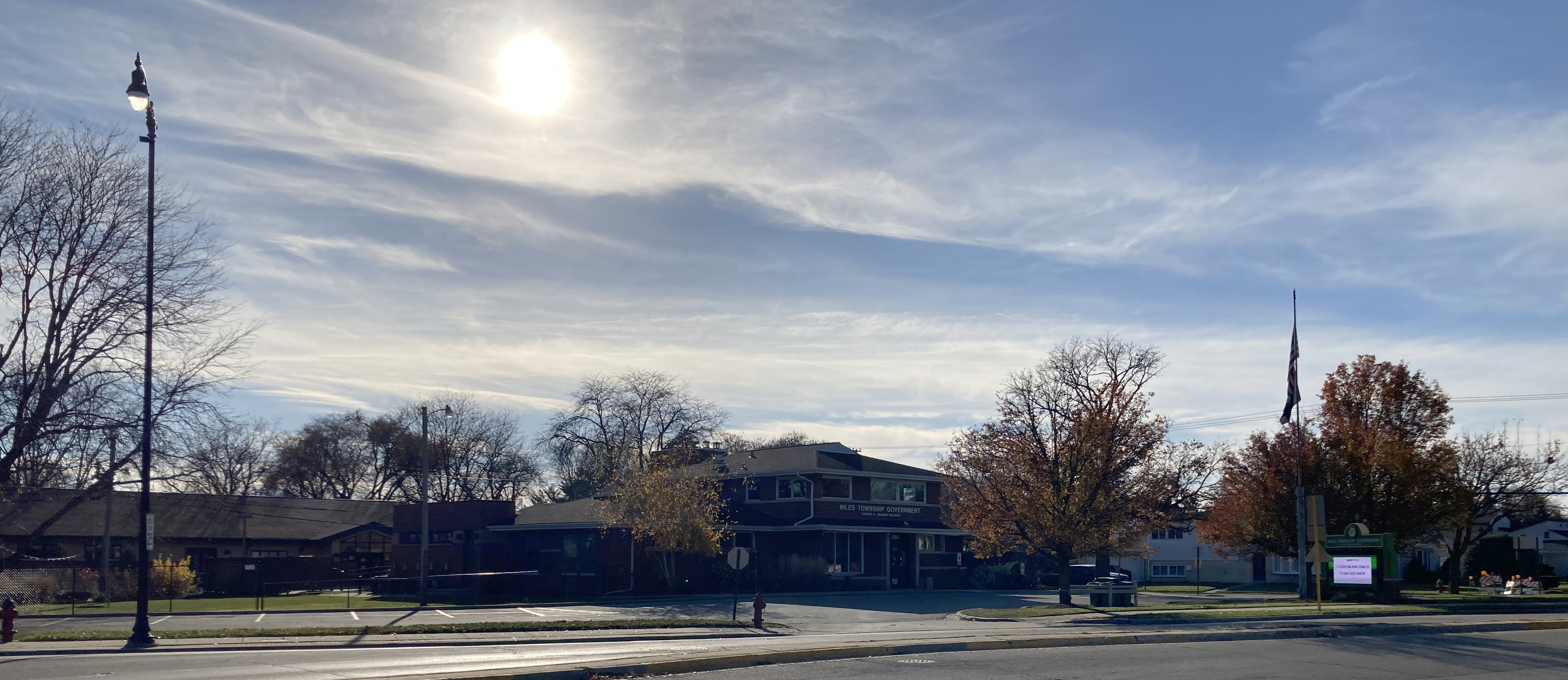
- Township Government Office

- Flag Seal

- Location in Cook County

- Cook County's location in Illinois
- Coordinates: 42°01′56″N 87°45′30″W
- Country: United States
- State: Illinois
- County: Cook

Area
  - Total: 21.25 sq mi (55.05 km^{2})
  - Land: 21.26 sq mi (55.1 km^{2})
  - Water: 0 sq mi (0 km^{2}) 0%
- Elevation: 620 ft (190 m)

Population (2020)
  - Total: 112,407
  - Density: 5,289/sq mi (2,042/km^{2})
- Time zone: UTC-6 (CST)
  - Summer (DST): UTC-5 (CDT)
- ZIP codes: 60025, 60029, 60053, 60076, 60077, 60091, 60201, 60202, 60203, 60645, 60712, 60714
- FIPS code: 17-031-53013
- Website: nilestownshipgov.com

Niles Township is one of the 29 townships in Cook County, Illinois, USA. As of the 2020 census, its population was 112,407.

== Geography ==
According to the 2021 census gazetteer files, Niles Township has a total area of 21.26 square miles (55.06 km^{2}), all land.

=== Cities, towns, villages ===
- Glenview (southeast segment)
- Golf
- Lincolnwood
- Morton Grove (east three-quarters)
- Niles (southeast half)
- Skokie

=== Adjacent townships ===
- New Trier Township (north)
- Maine Township (west)
- Northfield Township (northwest)

=== Cemeteries ===
The township contains nine cemeteries: Beth Jacob, Dewes, Memorial, New Light, Saint Adelbert, Saint Matthews, Saint Pauls Lutheran, Saint Peters Catholic and St Peter United Church of Christ.

=== Major highways ===
- Interstate 94
- U.S. Route 14
- U.S. Route 41
- Illinois Route 43
- Illinois Route 50
- Illinois Route 58

=== Airports and landing strips ===
- Lincolnwood Town Center Heliport

Historical population
Census	Pop.	Note	%±
2000	102,638		—
2010	105,882		3.2%
2020	112,407		6.2%
U.S. Decennial Census

== Education ==
=== Public schools ===
The Niles Township area contains ten main public school districts. Nine are elementary and middle/junior high school districts, pre-kindergarten through eighth grade. One is a high school district containing two high schools with grades nine through twelve:

- Golf School District 67
- Skokie School District 68
- Skokie/Morton Grove School District 69
- Morton Grove School District 70
- Niles Elementary School District 71
- Fairview South School District 72
- East Prairie School District 73
- Skokie School District 73½
- Lincolnwood School District 74
- Niles Township High School District 219

=== Religious day schools ===
Jewish

- Arie Crown Hebrew Day School (pre-K through 8th), boys and girls
- Cheder Lubavitch Hebrew Day School (pre-K through 8th), separate boys and girls programs
- Hillel Torah North Suburban Day School (pre-K through 8th), boys and girls
- Ida Crown Jewish Academy (9th through 12th), boys and girls
- Fasman Yeshiva High School (9th through 12th), boys only
- Solomon Schechter Day School Ginsburg Early Childhood Center. From 1978 to 2012 the day school had a campus in Skokie. After 2012 day students were moved to Northbrook, and the building is now MCC Academy's elementary school.

Muslim

- MCC Academy (Pre-K through 5th in Skokie campus, 6th through 12th in Morton Grove campus)

Roman Catholic

- St. Joan of Arc School (K-8), of the Roman Catholic Archdiocese of Chicago

=== Higher education ===
Oakton Community College is the area community college and is one of the top rated community colleges in the Midwest, with a main campus in Des Plaines and a satellite campus in Skokie. Oakton offer associate degrees, certificate programs, non-credit classes, and emeritus classes, as well as vocational programs, technology education, and classes in the visual and performing arts. The school's athletic program offers competitive volleyball, basketball, golf, tennis, baseball, softball, soccer, track, cross country, cheerleading, and intramural sports. Oakton's foreign language offerings include Arabic, Chinese, French, German, Hebrew, Italian, Japanese, Korean, Polish, Russian, and Spanish, as well as English as a second language, and resources exist to support students with physical, mental, emotional and behavioral disabilities.

== Demographics ==
As of the 2020 census there were 112,407 people, 37,783 households, and 26,820 families residing in the township. The population density was 5,287.75 inhabitants per square mile (2,041.61/km^{2}). There were 41,915 housing units at an average density of 1,971.73 per square mile (761.29/km^{2}). The racial makeup of the township was 54.84% White, 5.56% African American, 0.42% Native American, 28.01% Asian, 0.03% Pacific Islander, 4.01% from other races, and 7.12% from two or more races. Hispanic or Latino of any race were 9.63% of the population.

There were 37,783 households, out of which 30.50% had children under the age of 18 living with them, 57.13% were married couples living together, 9.37% had a female householder with no spouse present, and 29.02% were non-families. 26.60% of all households were made up of individuals, and 17.30% had someone living alone who was 65 years of age or older. The average household size was 2.70 and the average family size was 3.31.

The township's age distribution consisted of 21.9% under the age of 18, 6.4% from 18 to 24, 21.5% from 25 to 44, 27% from 45 to 64, and 23.3% who were 65 years of age or older. The median age was 45.3 years. For every 100 females, there were 90.5 males. For every 100 females age 18 and over, there were 87.2 males.

The median income for a household in the township was $77,832, and the median income for a family was $98,617. Males had a median income of $52,011 versus $39,421 for females. The per capita income for the township was $39,449. About 7.0% of families and 8.6% of the population were below the poverty line, including 10.7% of those under age 18 and 9.1% of those age 65 or over.

== Political districts ==
- Illinois's 9th congressional district
- State House District 15
- State House District 16
- State House District 17
- State House District 18
- State House District 20
- State Senate District 08
- State Senate District 09
- State Senate District 10
