= St. Martha Catholic Church =

Coordinates: 42°02′11.4″N 87°46′50.9″W

St. Martha Parish
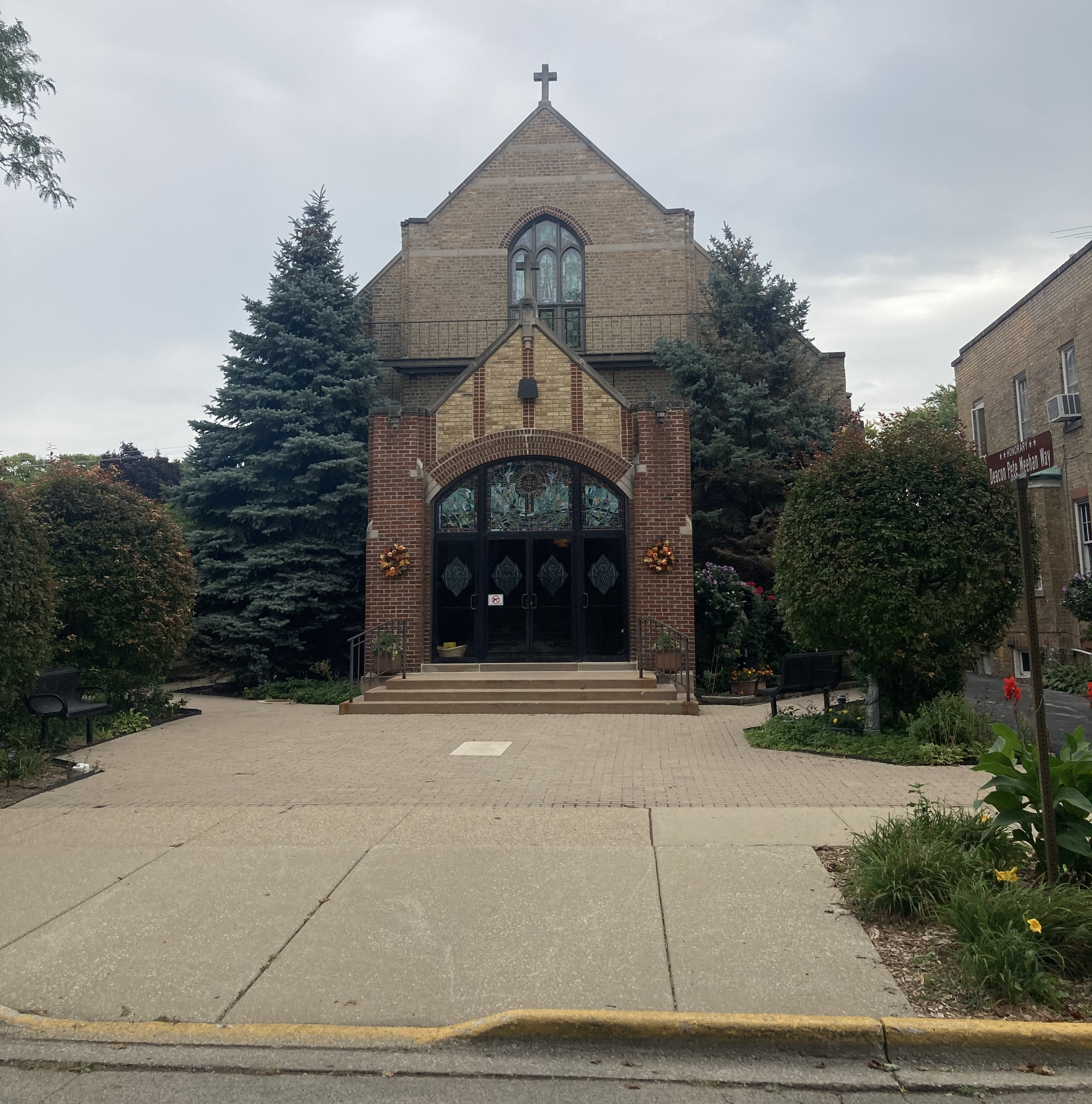

- Location in the Chicago area
- Location: Morton Grove, Cook County, Illinois
- Country: United States
- Denomination: Roman Catholic
- Website: saintmarthachurch.org

History
- Dedicated: 1919

Administration
- Archdiocese: Chicago

Clergy
- Archbishop: Blase J. Cupich
- Bishop: Francis J. Kane
- Pastor: Rev. Dennis O'Neill

St. Martha Catholic Church is a parish in the Archdiocese of Chicago located in Morton Grove, Illinois.

== History ==
German-speaking Catholic immigrants from Luxembourg had gathered for worship at least since 1866, initially traveling to Gross Pointe (Winnetka) and later to Niles Center (upon formation of St. Peter's in what became Skokie in 1868) for their spiritual activities, although Morton Grove also had a Lutheran congregation by 1903. The village initially developed as an agricultural area, with truck gardens and flower farms in rich soil along the North Branch of the Chicago River well outside the Chicago city limits. It also developed considerable night life, including activities then illegal in Chicago and the North Shore, including many taverns, speakeasies and brothels. Cardinal Mundelein recognized the Morton Grove parish in November 1919, assigning Fr. Martin Schmidt to serve both it and the upgraded mission that became Our Lady of Perpetual Help in Glenview. Fr. Schmidt soon recognized the distances and different communities involved, and called for an additional priest from the Missionary priests of the Divine Word to serve the 43 Catholic families in Morton Grove. Since Prohibition had closed a nearby tavern, it was rented for services at $25/month, with first chairs borrowed from the village hall, then second-hand pews acquired from an Evanston parish (St. Mary or St. Nicholas). St. Martha's first resident priest, Fr. Frederick Bergs, had been a chaplain during the first World War, and was assigned in December 1922. Under his direction, the congregation built a brick church, which was dedicated on May 4, 1924, and a rectory two years later. The congregation had already become diverse, for the Poehlman Greenhouses imported many orchids from the Philippines, and the parish developed a Filipino-American fellowship in addition to heritage groups of Irish-American and German-American faithful, as well as more diverse fellowships.

Fr. Lawrence H. Wand replaced the ailing Fr. Bergs in 1928, and served the parish through the Great Depression, before the archdiocese assigned him to a larger parish in 1941. His successor, Fr. Raymond Wilhelmi, served during the congregation's (and Morton Grove's) greatest growth. The church was renovated and decorated in 1944 and the following year a nearby residence purchased, which in 1946 became a convent for a teaching order of sisters. In 1947, the church basement was converted into three classrooms to serve 73 enrolled children. In 1950 a school was built with eight classrooms, library, music rooms and offices, by which time enrollment reached 270 pupils. The highest enrollment was nearly 800 pupils in the mid-1960s, after the parish built another building with an auditorium chapel and eight more classrooms.

The parish had 1,012 families in 1995, and currently remains large, diverse and active. The original 1924 church is used for smaller services, including early daily masses, the Sunday evening Latin Rite Malayalam mass, weddings and funerals. The Saturday evening and two largest Sunday masses are now held in what parishioners call the "big church", remodeled from what had been the school's gymnasium and auditorium dedicated on May 20, 1962, and now surrounded by displayed saints' relics as discussed below. During Lent, St. Martha's often hosts programs in conjunction with St. Isaac Jogues parish and St. John Brebeuf parish, in nearby Niles, Illinois.

== Parish School ==
St. Martha's Church acquired a house near the rectory which became a convent for teaching sisters in 1946. Thus began its parochial school, which built its own building in 1949 as the community expanded. (The Lutheran parson had been offering classes since 1906 and one of its congregants had bequeathed his home for use as a teachers' home in 1943.) St. Martha's parish also had its own boy scout troop, Troop 84, and its highest enrollment, nearly 800 students, in the mid-1960s. A decline in female vocations led the parochial school to rely on lay teachers beginning in 1972. The Archdiocese of Chicago ultimately closed the school for financial reasons. The parish school is now St. John Brebeuf School in Niles, Illinois. Part of the St. Martha school building not used for services and offices is now the Athena Hellenic School, a preschool for 3 to 6-year-old children. Some parish families not sending their children to the local public schools (East Maine School District 63, Park Ridge-Niles School District 64, Evanston/Skokie School District 65, Golf School District 67) prefer St. Mary of the Woods School in Chicago.

== Shrine of All Saints ==
As Morton Grove became culturally diverse, the parish did as well. Its current pastor, Fr. Dennis O'Neill (who began serving the parish in 2000) donated his relic collection to the parish in 2006. He noted that their patroness, St. Martha, is the patroness saint of hospitality. Parishioners also helped gather relics of saints from throughout the world, often rescuing relics as Catholic or Orthodox churches closed in other countries. It currently hosts over 2,500 relics of various forms and sizes, the oldest from the 5th century B.C.E. Cardinal Blaise Cupich dedicated the Shrine of All Saints on All Saints' Day (November 1, 2015), and accepted one of the small relics of his patron saint, St. Blaise as a gift. Two years later, some irreplaceable relics were stolen, and the poor box broken into, but a culprit was arrested, and the shrine has an improved technological security system. Cardinal Cupich is also expected to visit the parish on July 28, 2019, to celebrate its centennial.
