= Maine Township, Cook County, Illinois =

Maine Township
- Township
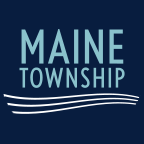
- Flag Seal Logo

- Location in Cook County

- Cook County's location in Illinois
- Coordinates: 42°01′59″N 87°51′53″W
- Country: United States
- State: Illinois
- County: Cook

Area
  - Total: 26.17 sq mi (67.77 km^{2})
  - Land: 25.97 sq mi (67.26 km^{2})
  - Water: 0.20 sq mi (0.51 km^{2}) 0.75%
- Elevation: 633 ft (193 m)

Population (2020)
  - Total: 140,600
  - Density: 5,414/sq mi (2,090/km^{2})
- Time zone: UTC-6 (CST)
  - Summer (DST): UTC-5 (CDT)
- ZIP codes: 60016, 60018, 60025, 60053, 60056, 60068, 60631, 60714
- FIPS code: 17-031-46162
- Website: mainetownship.com

Maine Township is one of 29 townships in Cook County, Illinois, United States. The population was 140,600 at the 2020 census. The township was founded in 1850.

Maine Township is located in Cook County, directly north and east of O'Hare International Airport in Chicago. Maine Township contains portions of the Chicago suburbs of Park Ridge, Morton Grove, Niles, Glenview, Des Plaines and Rosemont. The township also contains unincorporated sections which mostly use a Des Plaines mailing address. Even though they have a Des Plaines (and in some cases a Niles) mailing address, the addresses follow Chicago's numbering system, where the starting points are State and Madison. Interstate 294, also known as the Tri-State Tollway, passes through Maine Township.

== Geography ==
=== Cities, towns, villages ===
- Des Plaines (vast majority)
- Glenview (small portion)
- Niles (west half)
- Morton Grove (small portion)
- Park Ridge (vast majority)
- Rosemont (north third)

=== Extinct Towns ===
- Orchard Place at 41.998773°N 87.882785°W
- Riverview at 42.020461°N 87.886943°W

== Recreation ==
Park districts in Maine Township correspond to their respective suburbs. Unincorporated Maine Township uses the Golf Maine Park District, which has two main sites. Dee Park, located on Dee Road and Emerson Street, contains a large playground (the only playground in unincorporated Maine Township), three baseball fields, tennis courts, a basketball court, a roller hockey court, a fieldhouse, and paths that wind throughout the park campus.

Feldman Park is a fieldhouse building located on Kathy Lane behind Mark Twain Elementary School in Niles. The building houses a gymnasium, running track, some park district administrative offices, and indoor rooms used for various park district programs.

Golf Maine Park District has numerous programs for youth and adults, most notably its sports programs including Little League Baseball and its summer day camp, both housed on the Dee Park campus. They also host many events throughout the year such as the annual National Night Out Against Crime which is held the first Tuesday in August. Dee Park also hosts a large late summer picnic with refreshments, performances, music, crafts, sports, games and merchandise sold by local artists.

Golf Maine Park District does not contain a swimming pool anywhere within its boundaries, so those who live within the district are allowed to use pools from the neighboring Des Plaines Park District as in-district residents.

== Demographics ==
As of the 2020 census there were 140,600 people, 51,203 households, and 35,306 families residing in the township. The population density was 5,374.82 inhabitants per square mile (2,075.23/km^{2}). There were 56,610 housing units at an average density of 2,164.07 per square mile (835.55/km^{2}). The racial makeup of the township was 64.90% White, 2.47% African American, 0.70% Native American, 17.92% Asian, 0.02% Pacific Islander, 6.47% from other races, and 7.51% from two or more races. Hispanic or Latino of any race were 14.43% of the population.

There were 51,203 households, out of which 29.40% had children under the age of 18 living with them, 54.66% were married couples living together, 9.97% had a female householder with no spouse present, and 31.05% were non-families. 26.30% of all households were made up of individuals, and 13.50% had someone living alone who was 65 years of age or older. The average household size was 2.58 and the average family size was 3.17.

The township's age distribution consisted of 20.0% under the age of 18, 6.6% from 18 to 24, 24.9% from 25 to 44, 29.8% from 45 to 64, and 18.8% who were 65 years of age or older. The median age was 43.9 years. For every 100 females, there were 96.6 males. For every 100 females age 18 and over, there were 92.3 males.

The median income for a household in the township was $77,206, and the median income for a family was $97,674. Males had a median income of $52,546 versus $39,459 for females. The per capita income for the township was $41,584. About 5.5% of families and 7.6% of the population were below the poverty line, including 9.5% of those under age 18 and 7.6% of those age 65 or over.

Historical population
Census	Pop.	Note	%±
1930	20,855		—
1940	24,205		16.1%
1950	38,953		60.9%
1960	95,476		145.1%
1970	140,194		46.8%
1980	130,676		−6.8%
1990	128,837		−1.4%
2000	135,623		5.3%
2010	135,772		0.1%
2020	140,600		3.6%
U.S. Decennial Census

== Education ==
=== Public schools ===
The Maine Township area contains four main public school districts. Three are elementary and middle/junior high school districts, pre-kindergarten through eighth grade. One is a high school district containing three high schools with grades nine through twelve:

- Des Plaines Elementary School District 62
- East Maine Elementary School District 63
- Park Ridge-Niles Elementary School District 64
- Maine Township High School District 207

Park Ridge-Niles School District 64

District 64 is an elementary school district serving students in Park Ridge, IL* and part of Niles, IL. The District employs more than 600 staff members who provide a rich academic program and positive learning environment for approximately 4,500 students. The District operates five elementary schools for grades K-5: Carpenter, Field, Franklin, Roosevelt and Washington; two middle schools for grades 6-8: Emerson and Lincoln; and an early childhood education center at Jefferson School. (*East Maine School District 63 serves a small portion of northeast Park

The district now has 1 early childhood center, 5 elementary schools, and 2 middle schools; at one point the district operated 9 schools including Edison Elementary, Emerson Junior High, Field Elementary, Franklin Elementary, Jefferson, Lincoln Junior High, Madison Elementary, Merrill Elementary, and Washington Elementary.

The schools in the district include:

- Carpenter Elementary School, Park Ridge;
- Field Elementary School, Park Ridge;
- Franklin Elementary School, Park Ridge;
- Roosevelt Elementary School, Park Ridge;
- Washington Elementary School, Park Ridge;
- Jefferson Early Childhood Center, Niles;
- Emerson Middle School, Niles;
- Lincoln Middle School, Park Ridge

District 64 is often noted as having Hillary Rodham Clinton, former First Lady of the United States, Secretary of State of the United States, and New York Senator as an alumni. She attended Field Elementary School and Emerson Junior High.

==== East Maine School District 63 ====
"East Maine School District 63 is a K-8 public school district in Cook County, Illinois, with six elementary schools (K-5) and one middle school (6-8). Enrollment is approximately 3600 students. District 63 encompasses portions of five different communities - unincorporated Des Plaines, Niles, Glenview, Park Ridge, and Morton Grove. Each school is seen as part of the specific community where it is located. Demographics indicate that approximately 81% of the students come from homes where a language other than English is spoken. District 63 is a linguistically and culturally diverse community of learners reflective of the Chicago metropolitan area."

East Maine School District 63 was formed and the schools built after World War II. Originally, Apollo School was a Junior High School along with Gemini, which was originally known as East Maine Junior High School. This was during the baby-boom where area school enrollment was at an all-time high. Although today Apollo is now a primary school, the school is considerably larger than the other primary schools in the district. Apollo School is also the site for the district administrative offices and the TLC after school program. Over the years, some of the schools have closed and reopened due to population fluctuation and school building renovations.

In 2019, Gemini Junior High School became Gemini Middle School, shifting from a 7th and 8th grade junior high school structure to a 6th, 7th and 8th grade middle school structure. This caused the elementary schools in the district to shift from half day kindergarten K-6th grades to full-day Kindergarten through 5th grade.

Today, the district contains a total of seven schools, and all school buildings in the district are in active operation. The six primary schools serve grades Kindergarten through grade five. Gemini is the only district Middle School which serves the sixth, seventh and eighth grades. Melzer School also offers preschool classes for in-district three- and four-year-olds.

The schools in the district include:

- Apollo Elementary School, Des Plaines (Previously Apollo Junior High School);
- Melzer Elementary School, Morton Grove;
- Viola H. Nelson Elementary School, Morton Grove;
- Mark Twain Elementary School, Niles;
- Washington Elementary School, Glenview;
- Gemini Middle School, Niles (Formerly East Maine Junior High School, then Gemini Junior High School)

Previous District 63 Schools (closed, changed and/or demolished):

- Shelley Nathanson Elementary School (building now owned by Advocate Lutheran General Hospital)
- Woodrow Wilson Elementary School (closed, now Lakeview Community Church)
- Oak Elementary School (demolished)
- Ballard Elementary School (now Northridge Prep private school for boys)
- Adlai Stevenson Elementary School (now Expanded Learning Center for District 63)

==== Public high schools ====
see Maine Township High School District 207

=== Private schools ===
Although students of Maine Township attend a wide variety of private schools in Chicago and the surrounding suburbs, these are the main private schools located within the township.

- Saint Paul of the Cross Catholic School, Park Ridge, grades PK-8
- MCC Full-Time Islamic Girls School, Morton Grove, grades PK-8
- Mary Seat of Wisdom Catholic school, Park Ridge, grades PK-8
- Science and Arts Academy, Des Plaines, grades PK-8
- Brentwood Baptist Christian Academy, Des Plaines, grades PK-8
- Our Lady of Destiny Catholic School, Des Plaines, grades PK-8
- Saint Zachary Catholic School, Des Plaines, grades PK-8
- Our Lady of Ransom School (closed 2004), Niles, grades PK-8
- Saint Matthew Lutheran School, Niles, grades PK-8
- Saint John Brebeuf Catholics School, Niles, grades PK-8
- Plato Academy, Des Plaines, grades PK-8,
- Saint Andrews Lutheran School, Park Ridge, grades PK-8.

==== Private high schools ====
- The Willows Academy for girls (Des Plaines) and Northridge Prep for boys (Niles) are independent, Catholic junior and senior high schools for grades 6-12
- Notre Dame Catholic High School for boys, Niles, grades 9-12
- New Hope Academy Special Education, Niles, grades 6-12

=== Higher education ===
Oakton Community College is the area community college and is one of the top rated community colleges in the Midwest, with a main campus in Des Plaines and a satellite campus in Skokie. Oakton offer associate degrees, certificate programs, non-credit classes, and emeritus classes, as well as vocational programs, technology education, and classes in the visual and performing arts. The school's athletic program offers competitive volleyball, basketball, golf, tennis, baseball, softball, soccer, track, cross country, cheerleading, and intramural sports. Oakton's foreign language offerings include Arabic, Chinese, French, German, Hebrew, Italian, Japanese, Korean, Polish, Russian, and Spanish, as well as English as a second language, and resources exist to support students with physical, mental, emotional and behavioral disabilities.
