= Emerson Middle School =

Emerson Middle School may refer to the following schools in the United States:

- Emerson Community Charter School, formerly Ralph Waldo Emerson Middle School, Los Angeles
- Emerson Middle School (Illinois)
- Emerson High School (Union City, New Jersey)
- Emerson Middle School (Michigan)
- The Emerson School (New York, New York)
