= District 64 =

District 64 may refer to:

- Park Ridge-Niles School District 64
- Pennsylvania House of Representatives, District 64
- Texas's 64th House of Representatives district
- Wisconsin's 64th Assembly district
- Iowa's 64th House of Representatives district
