= MCCA =

MCCA may refer to:

- Massachusetts Convention Center Authority
- MCC Academy, a Muslim K-12 school in Illinois, United States
