= East Maine School District 63 =

School district in Illinois, United States

Address
- 10150 Dee Road Des Plaines, Illinois United States

District information
- Motto: Success Without Boundaries
- Grades: Pre-K - 8th
- Superintendent: Dr. Shawn Schleizer

Students and staff
- Students: 3,463
- Teachers: 253
- Staff: 400

Other information
- Website: www.emsd63.org/

East Maine School District 63, otherwise known as District 63 or East Maine School District 63, is a school district that serves parts of Des Plaines, Niles, Glenview, Park Ridge, and Morton Grove that reside in the Maine Township. The school district is headquartered in Des Plaines.

The school district consists of seven schools, one preschool, five elementary schools and one middle school. 8th-grade graduates are sent to Maine Township High School District 207, along with CCSD 62, and Park Ridge-Niles SD 64.

== Schools ==
School name	Address	Number of Students	Principal	Lowest grade	Highest grade	IRC Ranking
Apollo Elementary School	10100 Dee Road, Des Plaines, IL, 60016	592	Ms. Elizabeth Russell	Kindergarten	5th grade	Commendable
Gemini Middle School	8955 North Greenwood Avenue, Niles, IL, 60714	723	Dr. Alexandra Oreluk	6th grade	8th grade	Commendable
Mark Twain Elementary School	9401 North Hamlin Avenue, Niles, IL, 60714	325	Ms. Sarah Ezzat	Kindergarten	5th grade	Exemplary
Emma Melzer School	9400 Oriole Avenue, Morton Grove, IL, 60053	493	Ms. Angela Maki	Kindergarten	5th grade	Exemplary
V. H. Nelson Elementary School	8901 North Ozanam Avenue, Niles, IL, 60714	585	Dr. Lauren Leitao	Kindergarten	5th grade	Exemplary
First Steps Preschool	10000, Des Plaines, IL, 60016	429	Ms. Barb Golik	Preschool	PreK	NA
Washington School	2710 Golf Road, Glenview, IL, 60025	305	Ms. Katherine Anderson	Kindergarten	5th grade	Exemplary

- Based on 2017-18 Illinois Report Cards.

== Demographics ==
About 80% of the student population lives in houses that speak two or more languages. Out of 3,463 students, 31.6% of the student population is White, 28% Asian, 25% Hispanic, 11.1% with two or more races, 3.8% Black, 0.2% Pacific Islander, and 0.1% American Indian. 53% of students live in low income and 2% are homeless. 39% of the student population are English learners and 15% of students have IEPs.

== Leadership ==
District 63 employs a school board and a group of administrators to govern the district. The school board is made up of seven members, one of which is a president and another one being a vice president.
