= Glenview School District 34 =

School district in Illinois, United States

Glenview Public School District 34 is a school district in the U.S. state of Illinois located predominantly in the north Chicago suburb of Glenview. The schools are hailed for their high rankings within the state of Illinois and for having more than 70% of teachers with master's degrees. The schools which make up District 34 are broken into three groups: PreK–2, 3–5, and 6–8.

Dr. Dane Delli was appointed superintendent for District 34 in 2017 and began work on July 1. He had previously served as superintendent of the Mount Prospect-based River Trails School District 26 since July 2007. Dr. Delli has a Ph.D. and M.A. in Educational Leadership from Ohio State University, an M.S. degree in Education from John Carroll University and a B.S. degree in English Education from Bowling Green State University.

== Schools ==
PreK–2

- Henking School opened in 1959. The school was named after Louise Henking, a member of the board of education from 1948 to 1957. She was the first female president of the board of education. Henking School was selected as a National Blue Ribbon School in 2003–04.
- Westbrook School was named for Jesse N. Westbrook, the president of the Glenview Board of Education from 1934 to 1944. Westbrook School was built in 1950 and designed by the Perkins and Will architectural firm. Westbrook School was located close to the Naval Air Station Glenview, and educated many children of military families. Westbrook School was selected as a National Blue Ribbon School in 1988-89 and again in 1997–98.
- Lyon School was named for Clyde L. Lyon, the principal of Glenview School beginning in 1937, and the first superintendent of the Community Consolidated District 34 Board of Education (from 1942 to 1948). Lyon School was built in 1948 and designed by the Perkins and Will architectural firm. Lyon School was selected as a National Blue Ribbon School in 2003–04.

3–5

- Hoffman School was named for Lil Hoffman, a teacher and principal of the original Glenview School and later Rugen School from 1942 to 1948. Hoffman School opened in 1955.
- Glen Grove School was built in 1960. It was named for a natural glen on the site and the old Grove School.
- Pleasant Ridge School was built in 1961. It was named for its location, near the intersection of Pleasant Lane and Sunset Ridge.

7–8 (referred to as Junior High school)

- Springman Junior High School was named for John Springman, District 34 Superintendent from 1948 to 1970. Springman Junior High School was built on September 7, 1954 and was selected as a National Blue Ribbon School 1987-88 and again in 2008–09.
- Attea Middle School was named for Dr. William J. Attea, Glenview Public Schools Superintendent from 1970 to 1994. In 1990, Dr. Attea was named one of the nation's top 100 school administrators. Attea School was built on September 2, 2003 in the Glen, the historic land of the former Naval Air Station Glenview. Attea and Springman both have a large amount of their students on the High honor roll and the Honor Roll.

== Facts and figures ==
- Enrollment of 4,281 (in 2022)
- 366 teachers (in 2022)
- 70.4% of District 34 teachers have a master's degree or above (in 2022)
