= Glenview Creek =

River in Glenview, Illinois, US

Coordinates: 42°3′56″N 87°46′18″W

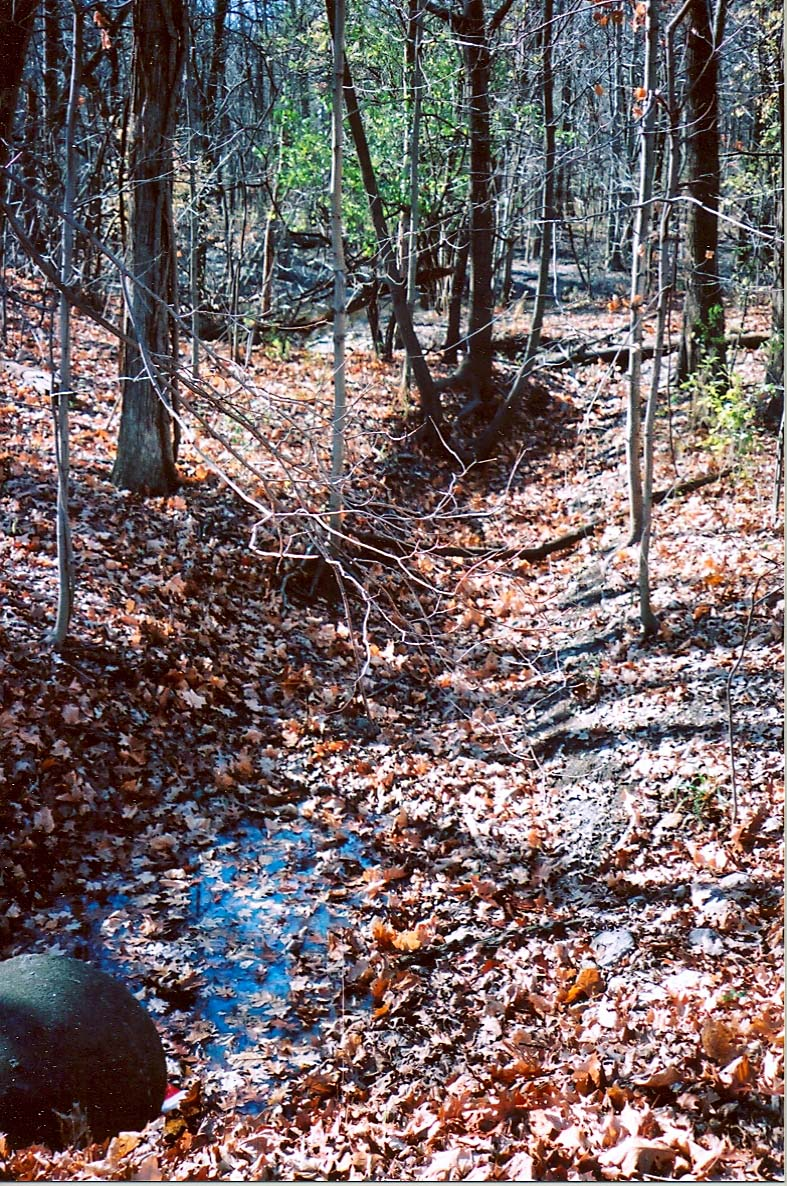
Glenview Creek in Harms Woods, flowing west towards the Chicago River via a shallow, winding ravine.

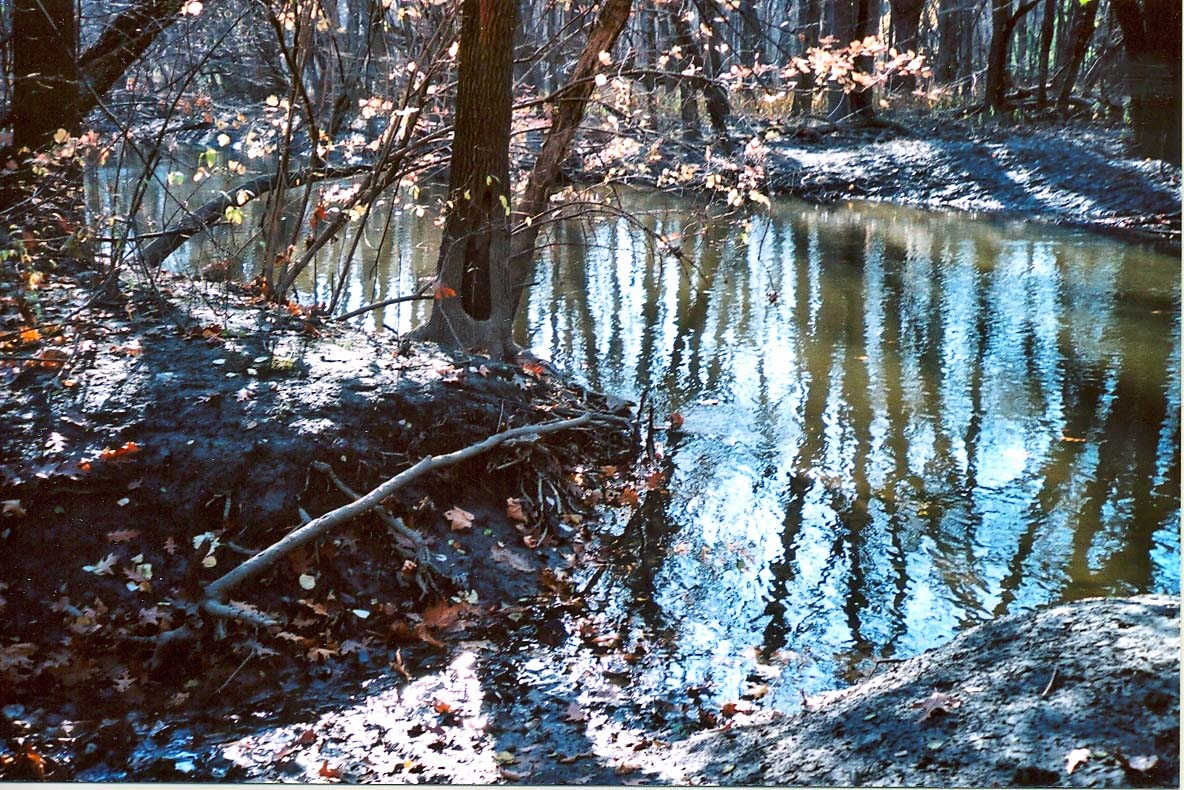
The mouth of Glenview Creek, such as it is. Glenview Creek, on the left, trickles into the Middle Fork of the North Branch of the Chicago River, on the right, in Harms Woods.

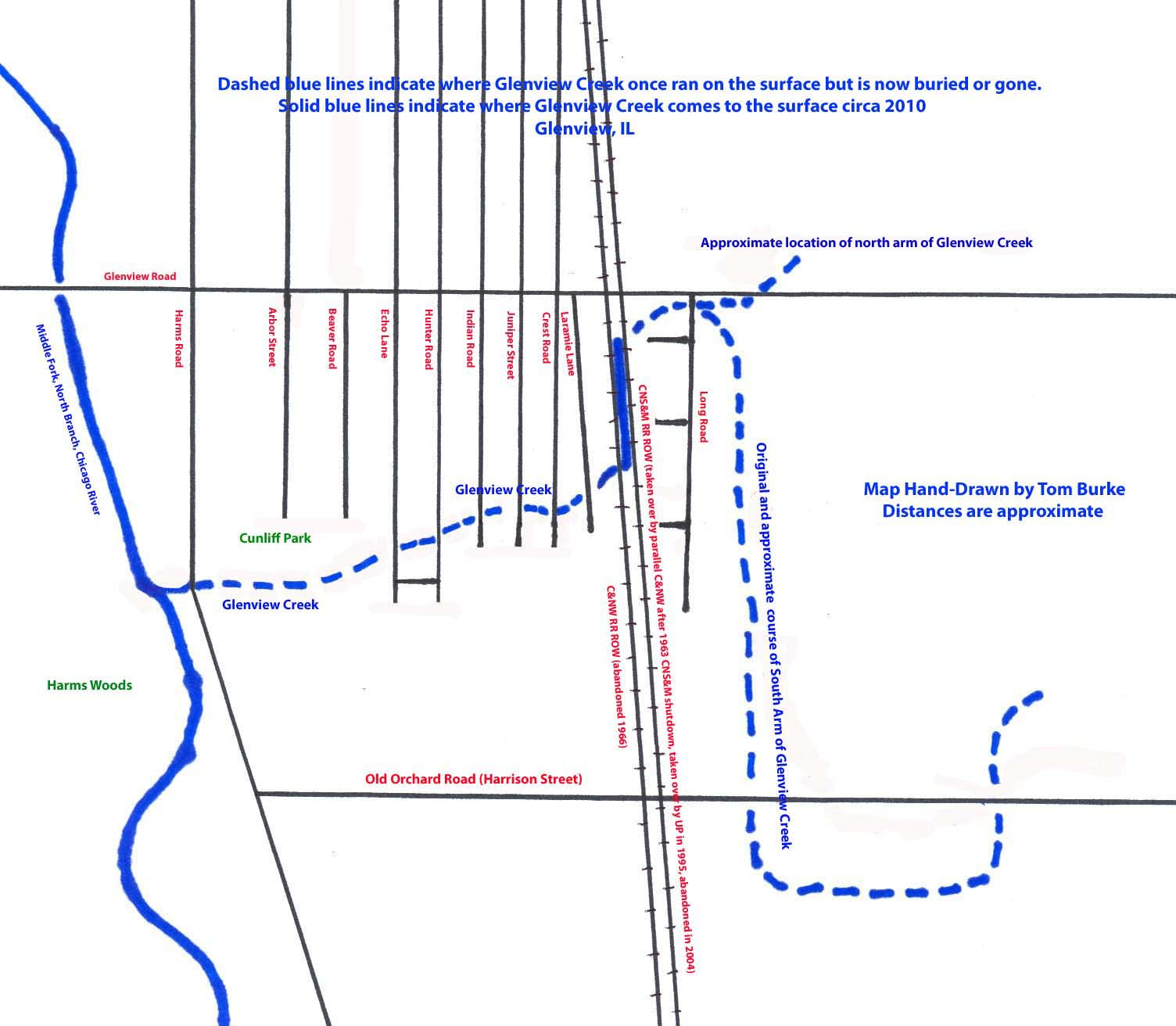
Map showing location of Glenview Creek on Glenview's southeast side including original headwaters in Skokie and Wilmette. Dashed lines show where it is either in storm sewers or has otherwise disappeared.

Glenview Creek flows on the eastern side of Glenview, Illinois, in the County of Cook. It now originates just south of Glenview Road and alongside the abandoned Skokie Subdivision of the Union Pacific Railroad (formerly Chicago & North Western) right of way. Glenview Creek flows in a west by southwest direction for approximately 3/4 of a mile to where it enters the Middle Fork of the North Branch of the Chicago River in Harms Woods.

A 1910 map shows Glenview Creek had an arm that at one time originated near the current intersection of the Edens Expressway and Old Orchard Road (formerly Harrison Street), then farmland. This long arm arising in the south is labeled as a ditch which crosses Harrison Street twice before heading north towards the main stem near Glenview Road. Another arm travels from the northeast to the southwest where it joins the arm coming up from Harrison Street on Glenview Road. The Chicago & North Western (C&NW) tracks cross on a trestle four feet high over the creek per the map label. The map gives a key coordinate, showing the trestle over Glenview Creek being precisely 1800 feet north of Harrison Street which validates its identity and location.

Valuation photos taken by the C&NW from approximately 1926 show two pairs of wooden trestles-one set for the C&NW and another set for the parallel Chicago, North Shore, & Milwaukee (CNS&M, this line was constructed in 1925)-spanning Glenview Creek just south of Glenview Road. The original captions on the photos clearly label the creek as "Glenview Creek."

Plans to bury Glenview Creek emerge as soon as 1933. A Glenview View article from September 15, 1933, states:

"The larger of the two projects is for the installation of storm sewer drains in that part of the village lying east of Harms Road. This job was authorized some time ago, but never completed. The cost is approximately $80,000. The other project calls for the completion of the sanitary sewer system immediately east of the Skokie [CNS&M] tracks and lying along the Wilmette boundary line. This work, costing about $10,000, was also unfinished. Both are special assessment projects."

In 1935 the Village of Glenview awaited approval of a Works Progress Administration set of public works projects to put people to work. According to the Glenview View newspaper:

"The largest of these projects is for the extension of the village sewerage system in the eastern part of the village. This would take in a large undeveloped area east of Harms Road and would add materially to the attractiveness of the property as a residential area. Many men would be employed digging the ditches, if this application is approved."

By 1936, the Works Progress Administration (WPA) project was approved and it placed most of Glenview Creek into storm sewers from Laramie Avenue west by southwest to Harms Road both to create jobs in the Depression Era and to facilitate drainage. According to a January, 1937, article in the Glenview View newspaper some 35 men were kept employed channeling these waters into a system of storm sewers. The article stated that the next step would be to put the surface waters of Glenview Creek east of the parallel railroad right-of-ways of the C&NW and the CNS&M in a sewer.

Glenview Creek shows up on an aerial photo of the area dated 1938 still flowing in the open from Echo Lane west through the area that later became Cunliff Park. To the south are farms. Its two arms in the headwaters are still shown. So given the articles above perhaps the work was not finished on time.

At some point prior to the mid-1960s the railroad trestles over Glenview Creek were replaced by precast culverts covered by earthen fill. Into the early 1970s the creek in this section between the two railroad ROWs ran clear and featured ferns along its shaded banks.

Glenview Creek now comes to the surface only in ditches between the two former railroad right-of-ways near Long Road on the far east side of the village and then again where it re-emerges from under Harms Road and flows some 150 feet into the Middle Fork of the North Branch of the Chicago River.

Glenview Creek historically appears on a number of maps-even after it disappeared from the surface. A USGS topographical map from 1980 clearly shows the contours of the gentle valley carved out by the then underground Glenview Creek including the stubs of its one-time arms in its headwaters.

An undated map from the Glenview Public Library shows Glenview Creek running on the surface from the C&NW and CNS&M ROWs all the way to where it empties into the Middle Fork of the North Branch of the Chicago River near Harms Road. The map presumably is dated prior to 1955 since it shows the Chesterfield Golf Course which was purchased that year by the Glenview Park District and renamed the Glenview Park Golf Golf Club. This map also shows the Edens Expressway which was opened in December 1951 so the timeframe would be between 1951 and 1955. The map however contradicts the article in the Glenview View from 1937 about Glenview Creek being buried in storm sewers though this map may have simply borrowed from other sources while sometimes maps can lag behind.

Another undated map from the Glenview Public Library shows Glenview Creek in section 8014 of New Trier Township.

Finally, Glenview Creek makes another appearance in a map contained in the book Route of the Electroliners where it crossed the Skokie Valley Line of the CNS&M by the CNS&M Glenayre train station on Glenview's far east side.

Heavy rains on September 13, 2008, caused water to back up from the Middle Fork of the North Branch of the Chicago River all the way east up the original valley of Glenview Creek to Laramie Avenue in a 100-year flood.
