= Skokie/Morton Grove School District 69 =

School district in Cook County, Illinois, USA

Address
- 5050 Madison Street Skokie, Illinois, 60077; United States

District information
- Type: Public
- Grades: PreK–8
- NCES District ID: 1736480

Students and staff
- Students: 1,764

Other information
- Website: www.sd69.org

Skokie/Morton Grove School District 69 is an elementary school district based in the northern Cook County village for which the district is named: Skokie, Illinois, United States. The district is composed of two elementary schools and one junior high school; one of the two elementary schools is home to a preschool program, while the other elementary school is the only school in the district not located in the village of Skokie. Students that are submitted to the TOPS (Teaching Our Preschoolers) Preschool Program are admitted to one of two teachers in Madison Elementary School, an institution that also teaches students in kindergarten or in grades one and two under direction of principal Christopher Basten.

Those in grades three through five attend Thomas Edison Elementary School in the village of Morton Grove, under direction of principal Andy Carpenter. The last district institution that students attend is Lincoln Junior High School, which accommodates students between grades six and eight, as directed by principal Alison Jenski. As of 2015 the district superintendent is Margaret Clauson. Each school has a mascot; the mascot of Madison Elementary School is the Superhawk, the mascot of Edison Elementary School is the dolphin, and the Lincoln Junior High mascot is the Spartan.

Lincoln Junior High School runs an intramural sports program, including several clubs.

== History ==
In 2014 the district sold the campus that was formerly a private Jewish day school, Solomon Schechter Day School, and the Kenton School to the Islamic school MCC Academy.
