= Community Consolidated School District 62 (Illinois) =

School district in Illinois, United States

Location
- 777 East Algonquin Road Des Plaines, Cook County, Illinois, 60016; United States

District information
- Type: Public
- Motto: Working Together For Our Children
- Grades: Pre-K through 8th
- Established: 1908
- Superintendent: Dr. Michael A. Amadei
- Governing agency: Illinois State Board of Education
- Schools: 11 Schools and Early Learning Center
- Budget: $92 Millions USD
- District ID: 05016062004

Students and staff
- Students: 4,401
- Teachers: 408
- Staff: 809
- Student–teacher ratio: 13:1

Other information
- Schedule: Monday - Friday
- Website: www.d62.org

Community Consolidated School District 62 (CCSD62) operates 11 schools and one early learning center in the city of Des Plaines, Illinois. Locally known as Des Plaines, School District 62 serves the communities in Des Plaines and Rosemont. (Note: Westerhold Early Learning Center and Forest Elementary School are considered the same school in the Illinois Report Card.)

CCSD62 graduates attend Maine Township District 207.

== Schools ==
=== Early Learning Center ===
- Westerhold Early Learning Center (Preschool - Jr. Kindergarten)

=== Elementary Schools (Kindergarten through 5th Grade) ===
- Central Elementary School
- Cumberland Elementary School
- Forest Elementary School
- North Elementary School
- Orchard Place Elementary School
- Plainfield Elementary School
- South Elementary School
- Terrace Elementary School

=== Middle Schools ===
- Algonquin Middle School (5th through 8th grade)
- Chippewa Middle School (5th through 8th grade)
- Iroquois Community School (Kindergarten through 8th grade)

== Demographics and statistics ==
As of the 2020-2021 school year, District 62’s student population consists of 41.6% Hispanic, 37.7% White, 12.7% Asian, 4.2% Black, 3.5% Multiracial, and 0.1% Pacific Islander students. 48.1% of students come from low-income households, 33.7% have limited proficiency in English, and 17% of students with IEPs. 0.9% of students are homeless, lower than the state average at 2%.

District 62 employs 408 full-time equivalent (FTE) teachers, with 86.7% White, 6.6% Hispanic, 4.1% Asian, 0.8% American Indian, 0.8% Multiracial, and 0.5% Black. The district has a pupil-to-teacher ratio of 15:1, with 87.7% of teachers identifying as female and 12.3% as male. The average teacher salary is $77,682, with 79.8% of teachers holding a master’s degree or higher and 20.2% holding a bachelor’s degree.

The average class size is 19 students and the total school days that the student population experiences is 176 days, a day short from the state average.

Note: Based on 2020-2021 Illinois School Report Cards.

== Leadership ==
District 62 employs a Board of Education, a superintendent, and an administration to govern the district.

=== Board of education ===
The Board of Education is made up of seven members that alternate through four-year terms with elections being held every two years. The Board of Education meet each other on the third Monday of every month or on Tuesday if Monday falls on a holiday. The seven members of the Board of Education includes a president, a vice president, 5 other members and a Secretary to the Board of Education.

=== Superintendent and administration ===
Michael A. Amadei serves as the Superintendent of Schools, with the administration consisting of assistant superintendents and directors specializing in curriculum, instructions, and student services.

== See also ==
- Maine Township High School District 207
  - Maine West High School - A part of HSD 207
- Community Consolidated School District 59
