= About Last Night (1986 film) =

Film by Edward Zwick

- Theatrical release poster
- Directed by: Edward Zwick
- Screenplay by: Tim Kazurinsky; Denise DeClue
- Based on: Sexual Perversity in Chicago by David Mamet
- Produced by: Jason Brett; Stuart Oken
- Starring: Rob Lowe; Demi Moore; James Belushi; Elizabeth Perkins
- Cinematography: Andrew Dintenfass
- Edited by: Harry Keramidas
- Music by: Miles Goodman
- Production company: Delphi V Productions
- Distributed by: Tri-Star Pictures
- Release date: July 4, 1986
- Running time: 113 minutes
- Country: United States
- Language: English
- Budget: $8.5 million
- Box office: $38.7 million

About Last Night (stylized as "About Last Night...") is a 1986 American romantic comedy-drama film directed by Edward Zwick, starring Rob Lowe and Demi Moore as Chicago yuppies Danny Martin and Debbie Sullivan, who enter a committed relationship for the first time. Along with featuring James Belushi as Danny's friend and colleague Bernie Litko, the film also marks the screen debuts of Elizabeth Perkins and Catherine Keener. The screenplay by Tim Kazurinsky and Denise DeClue is based on the 1974 David Mamet play Sexual Perversity in Chicago. The film was released by Tri-Star Pictures on July 4, 1986 and was both critically and commercially successful, and was remade with a predominantly Black cast in 2014.

== Plot ==
Dann" Martin and Bernie Litko, two twenty-something friends in contemporary Chicago, discuss their sexual escapades. Their recreational softball team, sponsored by local bar Mother's, defeats a local advertising agency in Grant Park. Debbie Sullivan, who works at the advertising company and is having an affair with her boss, Steve Carlson, catches Danny's eye and they flirt by the beer keg. She attends the afterparty at Mother's with her friends Joan and Pat. Pat flirts with Danny but Joan takes an immediate dislike to him. Danny and Debbie end up at his apartment and she hastily leaves after they have sex.

Danny calls Debbie at work the next day to ask her on a second date and they again end up in bed together. Danny tells Debbie that his dream is to quit his job at a restaurant supply company and open his own restaurant. Their decision to move in together disappoints Joan and Bernie, who dislike each other as well. Danny and Debbie struggle to adjust to living together, getting little support from their friends and having no experience of serious relationships themselves. Danny is conflicted when a former lover who is married with children contacts him, and Steve has difficulty accepting the end of his affair with Debbie. The couple endures a pregnancy scare and Danny clashes with his boss about cutting off Danny's friend Gus, who is defaulting on payments for supplies for his diner. The strains in Danny and Debbie's relationship peak at a New Year's Eve party at Mother's when a drunken Pat makes advances towards Danny, and Joan discovers her new boyfriend is married and returning to his wife. Danny, unhappy, ends the relationship and Debbie moves back in with Joan. When Danny begins to regret their breakup, he calls Debbie at work asking for another chance. She refuses, and when she encounters him at a St. Patrick's Day celebration at Mother's, she rebuffs him a second time.

Hoping to move on, Danny partners with Gus to revitalize his diner and fulfill his own dream. That summer, at another softball game, Danny and Bernie see Debbie riding her bicycle through the park with Joan, who encourages her to talk to Danny. They both express regret at how their relationship turned out. Danny suggests they go to a great new diner together. She coyly suggests going to "some old joint" instead and rides off without agreeing. Bernie encourages Danny to make his move and he runs after her.

== Cast ==
- Rob Lowe as Danny Martin
- Demi Moore as Debbie Sullivan
- James Belushi as Bernie Litko
- Elizabeth Perkins as Joan Gunther
- George DiCenzo as Mr. Favio
- Michael Alldredge as Mother Malone
- Robin Thomas as Steve Carlson
- Megan Mullally as Pat
- Rosanna DeSoto as Mrs. Lyons (as Rosana De Soto)
- Sachi Parker as Carrie
- Robert Neches as Gary
- Joe Greco as Gus
- Ada Maris as Carmen
- Tim Kazurinsky as Colin
- Catherine Keener as a cocktail waitress

== Production ==
At one point, Bill Murray and Nick Nolte were attached to appear in the film as the lead and supporting role respectively. A "disastrous meeting" between them caused both of them to turn down the film.

== Reception ==
=== Box office ===
The film was a box office success, grossing $38,702,310 domestically. It was the 26th highest-grossing film of 1986 in the United States, and the 10th highest-grossing R-rated film of 1986.

=== Critical response ===
On the review aggregator website Rotten Tomatoes, the film holds an approval rating of 68% based on 28 reviews, with an average rating of 6.4/10. The website's critics consensus reads, "About Last Night will perturb fans of the original stage play by sanding down its pricklier edges, but an amiable cast and sexual frankness make this a pleasantly grounded romantic comedy." Metacritic, which uses a weighted average, assigned the film a score of 70 out of 100, based on 17 critics, indicating "generally favorable" reviews. Audiences surveyed by CinemaScore gave the film a grade "A−" on scale of A to F.

Roger Ebert of the Chicago Sun-Times gave it 4 out of 4 stars, writing in his review that "About Last Night . . . is one of the rarest of recent American movies, because it deals fearlessly with real people, instead of with special effects." The lead performances were especially praised, with Ebert writing, "Lowe and Moore, members of Hollywood's 'Brat Pack,' are survivors of last summer's awful movie about yuppie singles, St. Elmo's Fire. This is the movie St. Elmo's Fire should have been. Last summer's movie made them look stupid and shallow. About Last Night . . . gives them the best acting opportunities either one has ever had, and they make the most of them." Sheila Benson of the Los Angeles Times called it "[t]ender, marvelously well played (by almost everyone) and thoroughly engaging. When it comes to the current sexual skirmishes between men and women, screenwriters Tim Kazurinsky and Denise DeClue [...] know every inch of enemy territory and take no prisoners." Vincent Canby of The New York Times gave it a mixed review, calling it "an occasionally bright, knowing look at the same singles scene that's been explored no less effectively by a number of other, very similar movies".

== Soundtrack ==
About Last Night: Original Motion Picture Soundtrack

Soundtrack album by various artists
- Released: 1986
- Length: 46:03
- Label: EMI America
- Producers: Narada Michael Walden; Dennis Lambert; John Oates; Michael Henderson; Paul Davis; Michael Omartian; JD Souther; Richard Burgess

The film's soundtrack album was released on EMI America Records. The album includes music by Sheena Easton, Michael Henderson, John Oates, Jermaine Jackson, John Waite, Paul Davis, and Bob Seger.

Track listing
No.	Title	Music	Length
1.	"So Far, So Good"	Sheena Easton	4:04
2.	"(She's the) Shape of Things to Come"	John Oates	3:40
3.	"Natural Love"	Sheena Easton	3:51
4.	"Words Into Action"	Jermaine Jackson	4:56
5.	"Step by Step"	JD Souther	4:27
6.	"Living Inside My Heart"	Bob Seger	3:28
7.	"Trials of the Heart"	Nancy Shanks	4:28
8.	"'Til You Love Somebody"	Michael Henderson	4:00
9.	"If We Can Get Through the Night"	Paul Davis	4:27
10.	"True Love"	The Del-Lords	3:47
11.	"If Anybody Had a Heart"	John Waite	4:34

=== Personnel ===
- Sheena Easton – vocals (tracks 1 & 3)
- John Oates – vocals, guitar (track 2)
- Jermaine Jackson – vocals (track 4)
- JD Souther – vocals, guitar (track 5)
- Bob Seger – acoustic guitar, guitar, piano, vocals (track 6)
- Nancy Shanks – vocals (track 7)
- Michael Henderson – vocals, bass (track 8)
- Paul Davis – vocals (track 9)
- Eric Ambel – guitar, vocals (track 10)
- Manny Caiati – bass guitar, vocals (track 10)
- Scott Kempner – guitar, vocals (track 10)
- Frank Funaro – drums, vocals (track 10)
- John Waite – vocals (track 11)
