= Jason Brett =

American film producer

Jason Brett is an American actor, writer and film producer, who produced the 1986 romantic comedy film About Last Night.

== Career ==
Brett attended the University of Illinois at Urbana–Champaign, where he received a Bachelor of Fine Arts degree in Theater. Moving to Chicago in 1975, he began his career as an actor, appearing in several Chicago theater productions including the Stephen Schwartz musical Godspell and Michael Weller's Moonchildren, for which he won Jeff Awards for his acting and production of the play. In 1978, Brett co-founded Chicago's famed Apollo Theater, where he produced over forty-five plays and musicals, including such Jeff Award-winning productions as the Steppenwolf Theatre Company's production of True West, starring John Malkovich and Gary Sinise; Balm in Gilead, featuring Laurie Metcalf; And a Nightingale Sang, with Joan Allen; Appearing Nightly, with Lily Tomlin; and David Mamet's Sexual Perversity in Chicago, with James Belushi. Brett has produced several plays for the New York stage, including Harry Chapin: Lies and Legends, with Amanda McBroom; and Banjo Dancing, with Stephen Wade.

In 1986, Brett co-produced the romantic comedy About Last Night..., for Columbia/TriStar Pictures. The film, directed by Edward Zwick, holds an 82% rating at Rotten Tomatoes and grossed $38.7 million domestically. As a screenwriter, Brett's first original screenplay, The Street Where You Live was a finalist for the Sundance screenwriting program. He went on to write more than a dozen original screenplays, including The Silent Service and Bomb Squad (Columbia/TriStar Pictures); Wildcard (Warner Brothers); Route 66 (Universal Pictures); and The Executive (Trimark Pictures). In 1987, Brett and Stuart Oken established Brett/Oken Productions under a two-year agreement with Weintraub Entertainment Group to develop and produce theatrical feature films.

From 1989 to 2000, Brett also wrote and or produced more than three dozen series, including "Elvis" (ABC), "Matt Waters" (CBS), and "Forever Knight" (USA Network).

In 2000, Brett founded ByteSize Entertainment, created to deliver one-minute clips of popular comedy shows (Seinfeld, The Chris Rock Show and SCTV) to a subscriber base. In 2001, prior to launch, the company was acquired by Mind Arrow Systems.

In 2002, Brett partnered with Chicago's improvisational comedy theater, The Second City, to develop and produce comedy film and television projects. As head of The Second City Film & Television, Brett oversaw the company's numerous production deals with Sony Pictures Television, Comedy Central, Canada's CBC and Global Television Network. Also during this time, the company released its television series SCTV on DVD.

Following his tenure with The Second City Film & Television, Brett was recruited to be Head of Comedy for Network Live, a partnership of AOL, XM Satellite Radio and AEG. For Network Live, he produced and recorded over twenty-five hours of stand-up and sketch comedy, featuring such then-emerging talents as Zach Galifianakis, David Cross and The Upright Citizens Brigade.

In 2010, Brett founded Big Things, Inc., a digital media company focused on developing on-line brands and live events around passionate, niche communities. In 2011, Big Things launched MashPlant.com, the first website developed exclusively for middle school kids who wish to share their video, music, animation, writing, comedy and performance projects. MashPlant.com connects kids with experienced industry professionals, who help to provide insight and inspiration.

In 2019, Brett collaborated with composer-lyricist Michael Mahler, writing the book for the new musical, 'Miracle'. The show, about a struggling family of die-hard Cub fans, and the Cubs' 2016 world championship season, opened to rave reviews on May 17, 2019, at Chicago's Royal George Theater. For his contribution, his first as a writer of musical theater, Brett and Mahler won the 2019 Joseph Jefferson Award for Best New Musical.

In 2020, Brett produced “Sweet Home Chicago”, a music video to raise funds for Chicago's performing artists and venues, sidelined by the pandemic. The music video, featuring dozens of Chicago celebrities including Julia Louis Dreyfus, Keegan Michael Key, Jim Belushi, Twista, Ramsey Lewis and Jim Peterik, raised more than $100,000 and won two, regional Emmy Awards.
