= Glenview, Illinois =

- Village
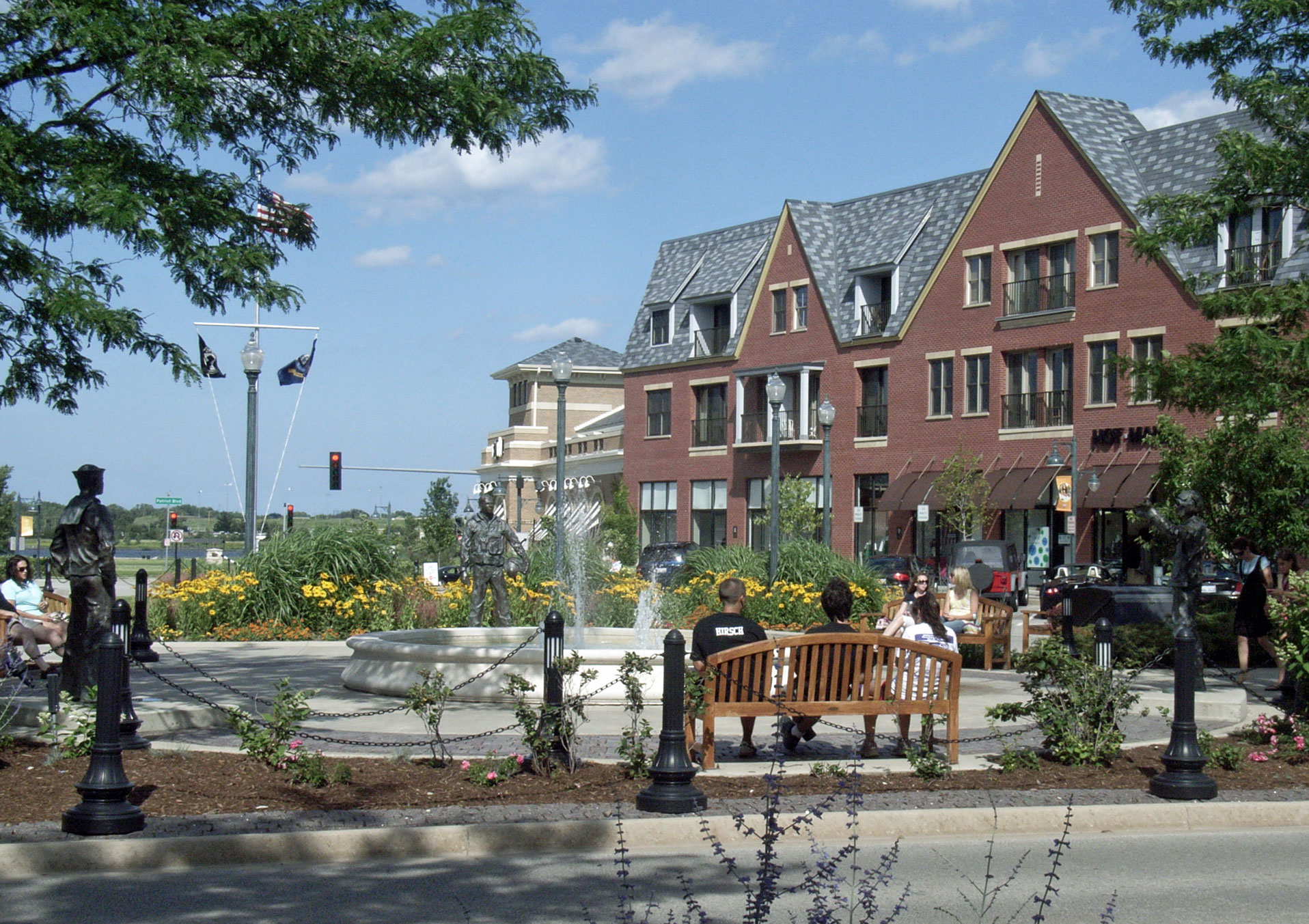
- The Glen Town Center

- Flag Logo

- Location of Glenview in Cook County, Illinois.

- Location in Greater Chicago Area Location in Illinois Location in the US
- Coordinates: 42°4′46″N 87°48′56″W
- Country: United States
- State: Illinois
- County: Cook
- Township: Northfield, Niles, and New Trier
- Incorporated: 1899

Government
  - Type: Trustee Village government
  - President: Michael B. Jenny

Area
  - Total: 14.04 sq mi (36.37 km^{2})
  - Land: 14.00 sq mi (36.26 km^{2})
  - Water: 0.042 sq mi (0.11 km^{2}) 0.29%

Population (2020)
  - Total: 48,705
  - Density: 3,478.6/sq mi (1,343.11/km^{2})

Standard of living (2009–11)
  - Per capita income: $50,615
  - Median home value: $454,500
- ZIP code(s): 60025, 60026
- Area code(s): 847 & 224
- Geocode: 29938
- FIPS code: 17-29938
- Website: www.glenview.il.us

Glenview is a village in Cook County, Illinois, United States. It is located approximately 15 miles (24 km) northwest of Downtown Chicago. Per the 2020 census, the population was 48,705. The Village of Glenview is governed by New Trier, Niles, and Northfield townships.

== History ==
The entire Northfield Township originally was known as the town of Northfield. There were different names for various areas within the community. The Post Office demanded that an official name be selected, whereupon a special meeting of the villagers was called. Various names were suggested such as Rugenville, Glenvarr, Glendale, Glengrove, Glen Hollow, Oak View, and Glenview. The name Glenview won the majority vote on May 7, 1895. The village was incorporated in 1899. Much of the Glenview area remained farmland but after World War II, developers such as Tom Sullivan began to give the township its current suburban appearance.

=== The Park ===
The Park is one of the oldest neighborhoods in the village, and was established as home to a religious society in 1894 by Hugh Burnham, the first village president and nephew of architect Daniel Burnham. This religious society is based on the writings of Emanuel Swedenborg a scientist and theologian who lived and wrote in the 1700s. In the late 1890s through the turn of the century, New Church members purchased 40 acres of land and built their houses in an oval surrounding a common park area where the church and school were built. Architect Swain Nelson, one of the designers of Lincoln Park, designed the neighborhood.

=== Naval Air Station ===
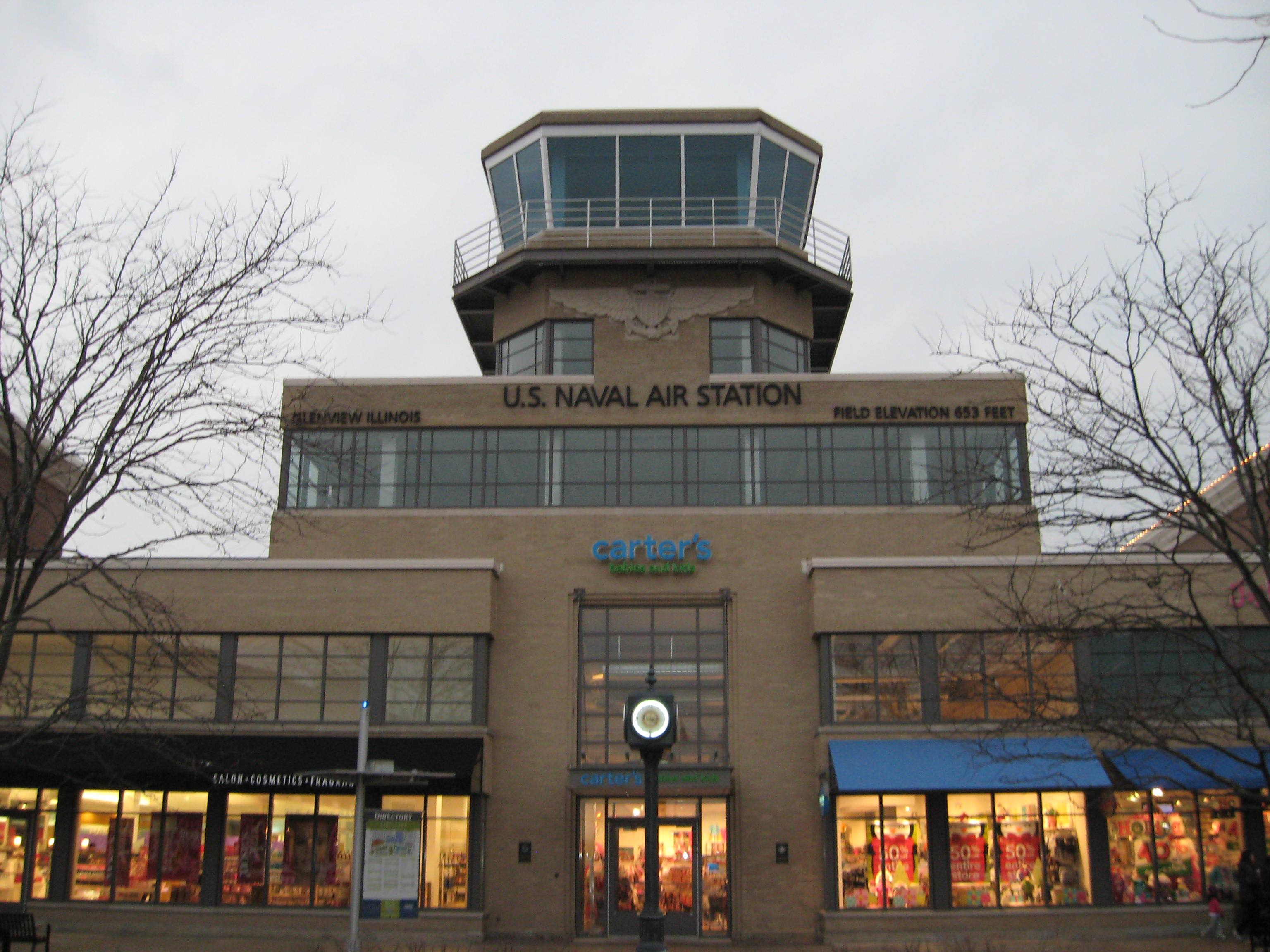
The control tower of the village's former Naval Air Station has been converted to The Glen Town Center

Naval Air Station Glenview was a base for Coast Guard air/sea rescue helicopter service for Chicago/Lake Michigan and a squadron of P-3 Orions which had the mission of East Coast antisubmarine warfare. In 1995, the base closed and was converted into a 1,121-acre (4.54 km^{2}) development named "The Glen", which comprises approximately 15% of Glenview. It contains homes, offices, shopping centers, The Glen Town Center, a lake, soccer fields, tennis courts, walking and biking trails, two golf courses, Kohl Children's Museum, the Glenview Park District Park Center, Attea Middle School, and the North Glenview Metra station.

== Geography ==
According to the 2021 census gazetteer files, Glenview has a total area of 14.04 square miles (36.36 km^{2}), of which 14.00 square miles (36.26 km^{2}) (or 99.70%) is land and 0.04 square miles (0.10 km^{2}) (or 0.30%) is water. Glenview Creek drains the southeastern corner of the village, emptying into the Middle Fork of the North Branch of the Chicago River.

=== Climate ===
Glenview has a continental climate (Köppen climate classification Dfa), with summers generally wetter than the winters:

Climate data for Glenview, Illinois
Month	Jan	Feb	Mar	Apr	May	Jun	Jul	Aug	Sep	Oct	Nov	Dec	Year
Record high °F (°C)	65 (18)	76 (24)	86 (30)	91 (33)	94 (34)	104 (40)	103 (39)	103 (39)	97 (36)	87 (31)	76 (24)	67 (19)	104 (40)
Mean daily maximum °F (°C)	32 (0)	37 (3)	47 (8)	60 (16)	72 (22)	81 (27)	86 (30)	83 (28)	76 (24)	64 (18)	51 (11)	37 (3)	61 (16)
Mean daily minimum °F (°C)	17 (−8)	21 (−6)	30 (−1)	41 (5)	51 (11)	60 (16)	66 (19)	65 (18)	57 (14)	45 (7)	35 (2)	23 (−5)	43 (6)
Record low °F (°C)	−25 (−32)	−14 (−26)	−1 (−18)	11 (−12)	30 (−1)	40 (4)	41 (5)	45 (7)	33 (1)	15 (−9)	−5 (−21)	−19 (−28)	−25 (−32)
Average precipitation inches (mm)	2.00 (51)	1.86 (47)	2.68 (68)	3.56 (90)	3.35 (85)	4.12 (105)	4.13 (105)	4.98 (126)	3.32 (84)	2.54 (65)	3.34 (85)	2.23 (57)	38.11 (968)
Source: Bing Weather

The highest recorded temperature was 104 °F (40 °C) in June 1988; the lowest recorded temperature was −25 °F (−32 °C) in January 1982.

== Demographics ==
Historical population
Census	Pop.	Note	%±
1910	652		—
1920	760		16.6%
1930	1,886		148.2%
1940	2,500		32.6%
1950	6,142		145.7%
1960	18,132		195.2%
1970	24,880		37.2%
1980	32,060		28.9%
1990	37,093		15.7%
2000	41,847		12.8%
2010	44,692		6.8%
2020	48,705		9.0%
U.S. Decennial Census; 2010 2020

=== Racial and ethnic composition ===
Glenview village, Illinois – Racial and ethnic composition Note: the US Census treats Hispanic/Latino as an ethnic category. This table excludes Latinos from the racial categories and assigns them to a separate category. Hispanics/Latinos may be of any race.
Race / Ethnicity (NH = Non-Hispanic)	Pop 2000	Pop 2010	Pop 2020	% 2000	% 2010	% 2020
White alone (NH)	34,778	35,434	34,589	83.11%	79.28%	71.02%
Black or African American alone (NH)	646	431	519	1.54%	0.96%	1.07%
Native American or Alaska Native alone (NH)	23	25	37	0.05%	0.06%	0.08%
Asian alone (NH)	4,183	5,535	8,042	10.00%	12.38%	16.51%
Pacific Islander alone (NH)	7	21	9	0.02%	0.05%	0.02%
Other race alone (NH)	39	59	250	0.09%	0.13%	0.51%
Mixed race or Multiracial (NH)	469	603	1,664	1.12%	1.35%	3.42%
Hispanic or Latino (any race)	1,702	2,584	3,685	4.07%	5.78%	7.38%
Total	41,847	44,692	48,705	100.00%	100.00%	100.00%

=== 2020 census ===
As of the 2020 census, Glenview had a population of 48,705, with 17,855 households and 12,862 families residing in the village. The population density was 3,468.28 inhabitants per square mile (1,339.11/km^{2}), and there were 18,933 housing units at an average density of 1,348.22 per square mile (520.55/km^{2}).

The median age was 46.3 years. 23.0% of residents were under the age of 18 and 23.8% of residents were 65 years of age or older. For every 100 females there were 90.4 males, and for every 100 females age 18 and over there were 86.2 males age 18 and over.

Of all households, 33.4% had children under the age of 18 living in them. 63.3% were married-couple households, 10.6% were households with a male householder and no spouse or partner present, and 23.5% were households with a female householder and no spouse or partner present. About 23.5% of all households were made up of individuals, and 14.9% had someone living alone who was 65 years of age or older. The average household size was 3.14 and the average family size was 2.57.

100.0% of residents lived in urban areas, while 0.0% lived in rural areas. 5.7% of housing units were vacant. The homeowner vacancy rate was 1.4% and the rental vacancy rate was 9.5%.

=== Income and poverty ===
The median income for a household in the village was $118,019, and the median income for a family was $148,277. Males had a median income of $85,854 versus $54,917 for females. The per capita income for the village was $66,098. About 3.1% of families and 4.8% of the population were below the poverty line, including 5.8% of those under age 18 and 3.1% of those age 65 or over.

=== Religion ===
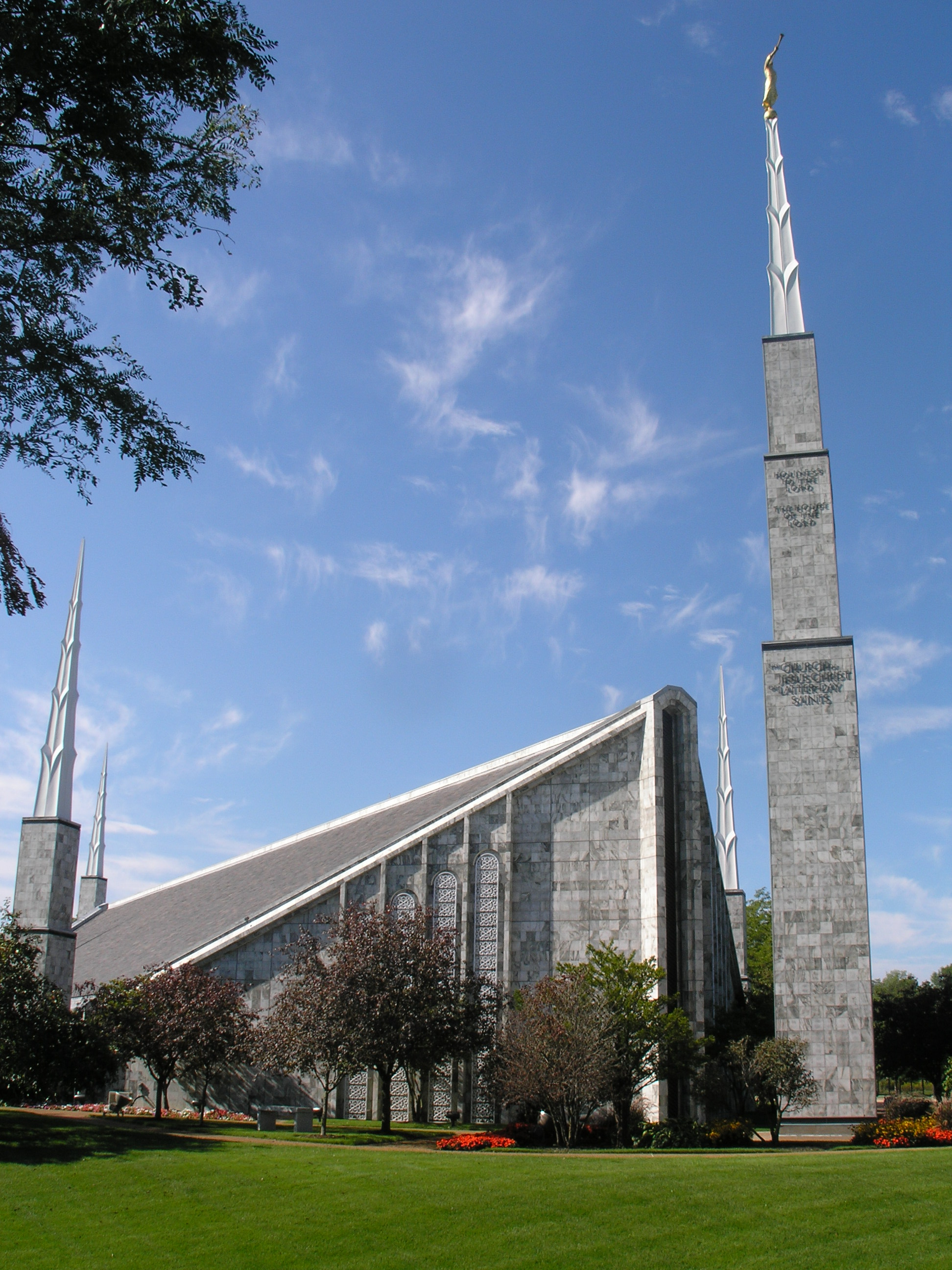
The Chicago Illinois Temple of The Church of Jesus Christ of Latter-day Saints was built in 1985 and is located northwest of downtown Glenview.

Glenview is home to a rather diverse religious community, including Evangelicals, Catholics, Presbyterians, Mormons, Lutherans, Methodists, Episcopalians, Congregationalists, Jews, Hindus, and Muslims. Several religious communities are as old or older than the village itself. The village is home to two Catholic parishes, St. Catherine Laboure and Our Lady of Perpetual Help Parish. In 1985, The Church of Jesus Christ of Latter-day Saints built the scenic Chicago Illinois Temple in Glenview to serve Mormons in Illinois and surrounding areas.

== Economy ==
A number of major U.S. corporations have major facilities or offices in Glenview, including Illinois Tool Works, Reedy Industries, Scott Foresman, and Republic Tobacco. Kraft Heinz conducts research and development at its Glenview innovation center. Family Video had its headquarters in Glenview. There are also several large non-profit organizations in Glenview, including the headquarters of the American College of Chest Physicians CHEST Foundation as well as the United Methodist Church's General Board of Pension and Health Benefits and Wespath Benefits and Investments agencies.

=== Largest employers ===
According to Glenview's 2021 Comprehensive Annual Financial Report, the top employers in the city are:

#	Employer	# of Employees
1	Astellas	2,448
2	Abt Electronics	1,660
3	Glenbrook Hospital	1,000
4	Anixter	916
5	Glenview Public School District 34	740
6	Illinois Tool Works	640
7	Kraft Foods	580
8	Glenbrook South High School	405
9	Signode	393
10	Glenview Terrace Nursing Home	351

== Parks and recreation ==
=== Park Center ===
The Park Center is a prairie-style multi-purpose community center, one of the largest in Illinois, and is located in the heart of The Glen on the shores of Lake Glenview. The Park Center has an indoor pool (Splash Landings Indoor Aquatic Complex), Park Center Health & Fitness, Park Center Preschool, Glenview Senior Center, along with many programs including arts, dance, and adult and youth sports programs.

=== The Grove ===
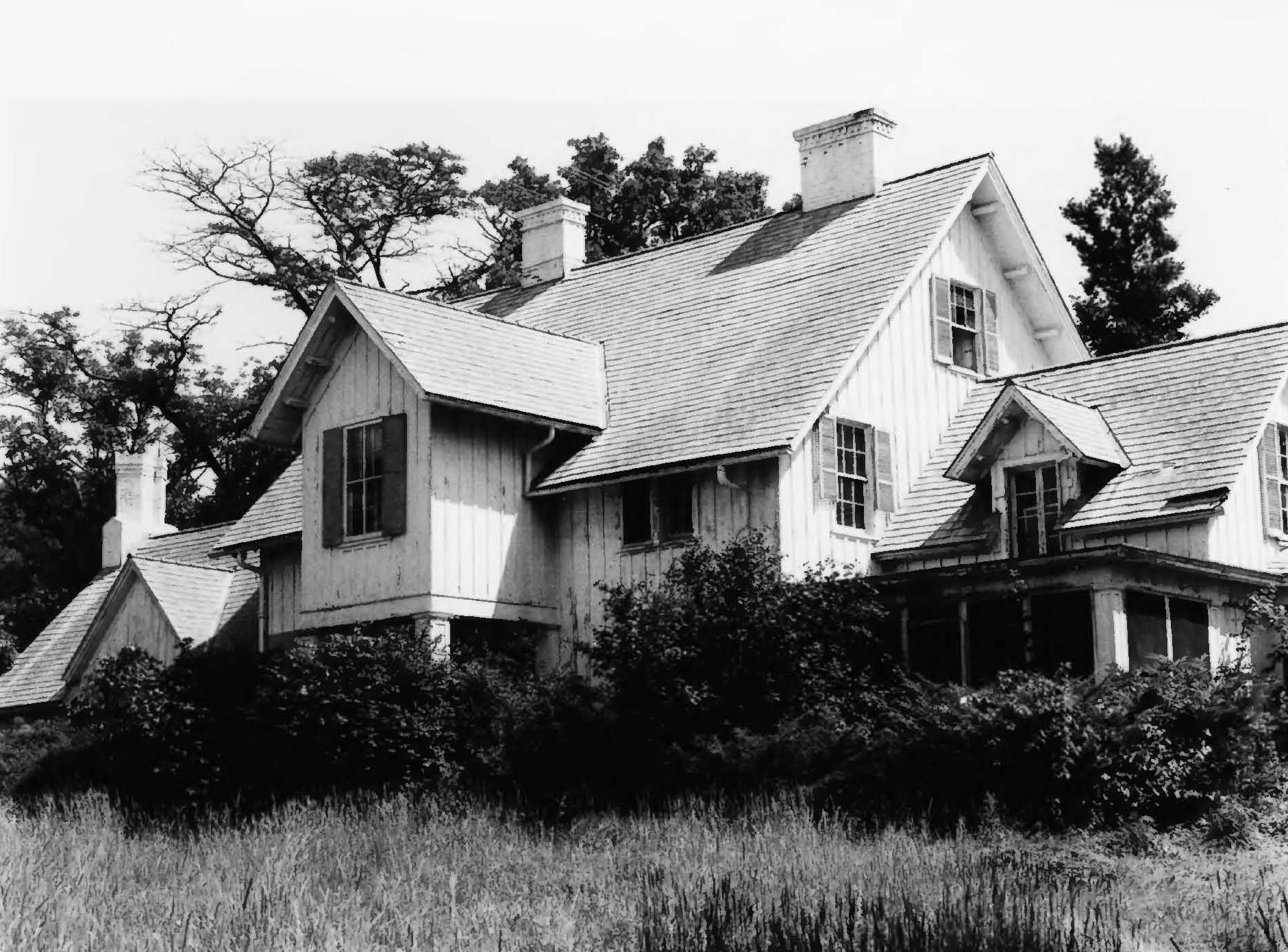
The Grove includes the Kennicott House, which was built in 1856.

The Grove is an area of prairie that contains an interpretive center, historic buildings, and nature trails. The Grove houses many animals for visitors to interact with, such as snakes, snapping turtles, and skunks. It covers 123 acres (0.50 km^{2}), and is a National Historic Landmark, and is listed on the National Register of Historic Places.

=== Wagner Farm ===
Wagner Farm is an 18.6-acre (7.5 ha) farm owned by the Glenview Park District. In 2007, the farm had over 54,000 visitors. Wagner Farm features educational programming on history and farming, wagon rides, a gift shop, and activities that reflect farm life in the 1920s.

=== Forest Preserve ===
Glenview includes portions of the Forest Preserve District of Cook County, which encompass approximately 68,000 acres (280 km^{2}) of open space within the urban surroundings of Chicago. The preserves are made up of forest, prairie, wetland, streams, and lakes, and features wildlife, a bike path, the Glenview Woods, and campsites.

== Education ==
=== Public schools ===
Over half of Glenview lies within Glenview School District 34. Glenview School District 34 is the predominant K-8 district in central Glenview. Schools in this district include:

- Henking Elementary School
- Westbrook Elementary School
- Lyon Elementary School
- Hoffman Elementary School
- Glen Grove Elementary School
- Pleasant Ridge Elementary School
- Attea Middle School
- Springman Junior High School

Southeast and East Glenview residents are served by Wilmette Public Schools District 39 and Avoca School District 37. Northeast Glenview is served by Northbrook/Glenview School District 30, which includes Willowbrook Elementary School and Maple Junior High. Northwest Glenview is served by West Northfield School District 31.

Most of Glenview is located within the Glenbrook South High School attendance area of Northfield Township High School District 225.

Glenview residents who live on or east of Harms Road are served by New Trier Township High School District 203. Public high school students who reside there attend New Trier High School in Northfield and Winnetka.

A small portion of Glenview south of Central Road is served by East Maine School District 63 and Maine Township High School District 207. Public school students who reside in that area attend Washington or Melzer Elementary, Gemini Junior High, and Maine East High School.

=== Private schools ===
Glenview is home to three parochial schools: Our Lady of Perpetual Help School, Open Arms Christian Child Development Center (a ministry of Immanuel Lutheran Church), and Saint Catherine Labouré School. Our Lady of Perpetual Help and Saint Catherine Labouré educate pre-K and K-8 students. Open Arms Christian Child Development Center is a school for pre-K and kindergarten students. Glenview New Church School offers a Christian-based education for pre-K and K-8 students as well as some classes for high school students as part of the Midwestern Academy of the New Church program. Kensington School has a campus in Glenview, and offers pre-K and kindergarten education.

== Infrastructure ==
=== Transportation ===
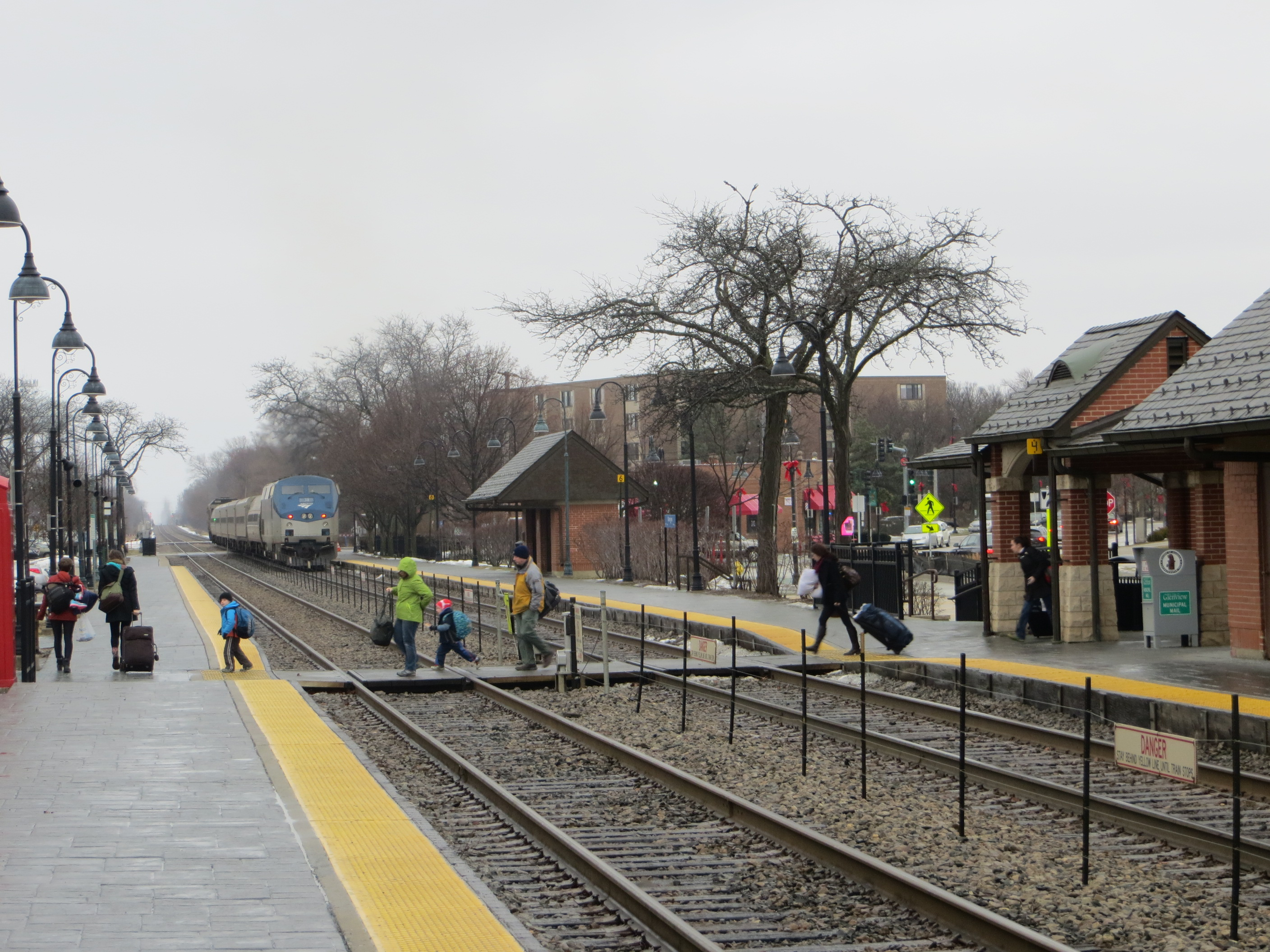
Glenview station is served by Amtrak and Metra passenger trains

Two stations (Glenview station and North Glenview station) provide Metra commuter rail service along the Milwaukee District North Line. Trains travel south to Chicago Union Station, and north to Fox Lake station. The Glenview station also serves Amtrak trains, with the Borealis, Empire Builder, and Hiawatha calling at the station.

Pace provides bus service on multiple routes connecting Glenview to destinations across the region.

== Notable people ==
- Emily Bergl, actress (Desperate Housewives); raised in Glenview
- Helen Brach, heiress to Brach Candy; disappeared in 1977 and declared legally dead in 1984.
- Jason Brett, writer, producer, founder Apollo Theater Chicago, producer of About Last Night, founder MashPlant
- Han Chae-young, Korean model and actress
- Dan Chmielinski, Jazz bassist and composer
- Jack Cooley, former NBA Forward for the Sacramento Kings
- Pat Foley, broadcaster for Chicago Blackhawks; raised in Glenview, attended OLPH and Loyola Academy
- Michael Gargiulo, serial killer known as the Hollywood Ripper
- Jami Gertz, actress, grew up in Glenview
- Artis Gilmore, former Professional ABA and NBA player
- Brian Hansen, Olympic silver medalist in speed skating; attended Glenbrook South
- Robert Kennicott, explorer and naturalist, grew up in West Northfield, now called Glenview
- Arian Moayed, Tony- and Emmy-nominated actor who grew up in Glenview and attended Glenbrook South High School.
- Al Montoya, an NHL goaltender for the Montreal Canadiens, was raised in Glenview
- Leonid Radvinsky, was an owner of OnlyFans adult entertainment website, raised in Glenview and attended Glenbrook South High School
- Betsy Randle, actress (Boy Meets World); raised in Glenview
- Mark Shapiro, media executive and former CEO of the former Six Flags company
- Olivia Smoliga, swimmer who competed in the 2016 Summer Olympics; born in Glenview; attended Glenbrook South.
- John Splithoff, musician; attended Glenbrook South
- Patrick Stump, guitarist; lead singer and head songwriter of Fall Out Boy; attended Glenbrook South
- Samuel Witwer, actor ("Being Human") and musician; born in Glenview; attended Glenbrook South
- John Bruce Yeh, clarinetist
- Molly Yeh, cooking television show hostess (Girl Meets Farm)
