= Our Lady of Perpetual Help (Glenview, Illinois) =

Our Lady of Perpetual Help Parish
- OLPH
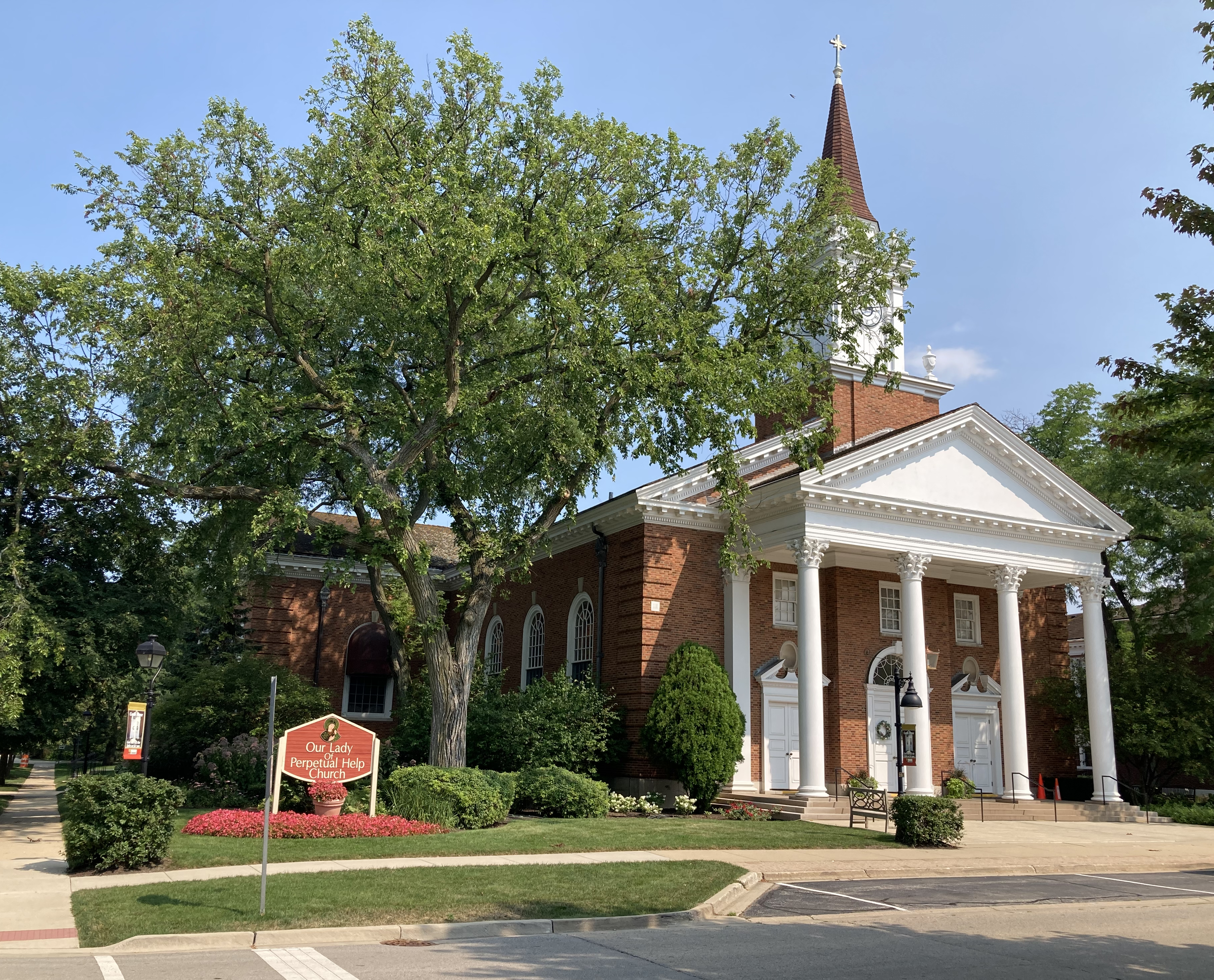

- Location in the Chicago area
- 42.0749°N 87.8017°W
- Location: Glenview, Cook County, Illinois
- Country: United States
- Denomination: Roman Catholic
- Website: olphglenview.org

History
- Former name: St. Joseph
- Dedicated: November 1, 1907

Administration
- Archdiocese: Chicago

Clergy
- Archbishop: Blase J. Cupich
- Bishop: Francis J. Kane
- Pastor: Jeremiah "Jerry" Boland

Our Lady of Perpetual Help Parish, often abbreviated OLPH, is a Roman Catholic parish of the Archdiocese of Chicago located in suburban Glenview, Illinois, approximately 16 miles (26 km) north-northwest of downtown Chicago. Originally established in 1907 as the Mission of St. Joseph, Our Lady of Perpetual Help is now one of two Catholic parishes in Glenview along with St. Catherine Laboure. The parish numbers about 3,000 families. As a result, OLPH celebrates no fewer than seven Masses every weekend. Rev. Jeremiah "Jerry" Boland is the current pastor, and Rev. Thomas E. Hickey is pastor emeritus. In addition, OLPH has three associate pastors and two deacon couples.

== History ==
OLPH's history dates to the early 1900s. Although area Catholics at that time technically belonged to the parish of St. Joseph Catholic Church (Wilmette, Illinois) located in Grosse Pointe, now Wilmette, missionary priests often traveled to Glenview to minister to Catholics there. The Catholics in Glenview petitioned the help of Fr. William Netstraeter to help establish the new mission in Glenview. The original OLPH Church, located on the same site as the current structure, was dedicated in 1907 as the Mission of St. Joseph. In 1915, Rev. John Vattman renamed the parish Our Lady of Perpetual Help to commemorate a representation of the Virgin Mary that he had given to the church.

OLPH’s resident pastor, Rev. Martin C. Schmidt, was installed in 1919, when Our Lady of Perpetual Help became a permanent parish. At the time, the small congregation was still considered a “county parish.” According to legend, upon his appointment as pastor, Fr. Schmidt admitted he did not know where Glenview was located. When Fr. Schmidt asked George W. Mundelein, then the Archbishop of Chicago, the Archbishop purportedly answered, “I don’t know. You’ll have to look it up.”

The church continued to grow throughout the 20th century, acquiring land east of the church building to construct a school and convent. Rev. John J. Dussman served as OLPH’s pastor for approximately thirty-four years, from 1934 until his retirement in 1971. Fr. Dussman was succeeded by Rev. Myles P. McDonnell, who served the parish until 1989. Rev. John E. Flavin served as pastor between 1989 and 2007, when recent pastor Thomas E. Hickey, was appointed to the role. On July 15, 2007, OLPH marked its 100th anniversary with a concelebrated Mass of celebration with principal celebrant Francis Cardinal George, the archbishop of Chicago.

Upon election of Pope Francis in March 2013, then-pastor Fr. Hickey expressed his support for the new pontiff, saying that although the choice was a "surprise," he believed the choice reflected the growth of Catholicism in the southern hemisphere. The pastor also expressed hope that Pope Francis would "convey a message of more openness and inclusiveness."

== Features and ministries ==
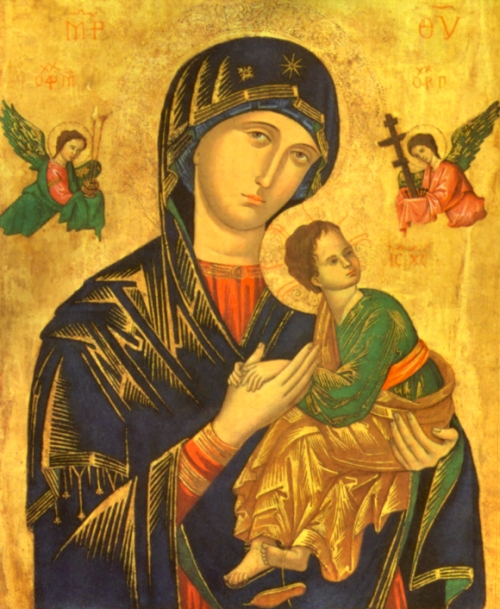
In 1915, Rev. John Vattman changed the parish name to Our Lady of Pereptual Help in honor of the Virgin Mary as depicted in this religious icon from the 15th century.

OLPH considers itself to represent “a family of believers in Christ who strive to live according to his teachings” that “take as [their] mission in the world the living out of the Gospel of Jesus.” According to the parish website, OLPH ministries include care for the sick and bereaved, counseling services, a singles’ group, business network group, men’s and women’s clubs, and a youth organization. The parish is also actively involved in food drives and emergency meal assistance through its Meal Ministry.

== OLPH School ==
In September of 1929, the founders of Our Lady of Perpetual Help Church founded OLPH School. OLPH is the largest elementary and grade school in the Archdiocese of Chicago. The current principal is Dr. Amy Mills, with Ms. Patricia Musker and Ms. Lori Parsek as vice principals. Today, OLPH teaches preschool through 8th grade. It has 744 students and 58 full-time teachers. Among these 744 students, 48% are female and 52% are male; 84.5% are Caucasian and 15.5% are other races, such as Asian and Hispanic. The student-teacher ratio at OLPH School is 13:1 for preschool and 16:1 for PK-8, with the national average being 17:1. The tuition cost of attending OLPH School is $6,460/yr for PK-8 and $5,595/yr for preschool, with the average annual cost altogether being $33,639/yr.
