= Golf School District 67 =

School district in Illinois, United States

Location
- Morton Grove, Illinois; United States
- Coordinates: Golf Middle School: 42.0525°N 87.7987°W; Hynes Elementary School: 42.0454°N 87.8033°W

District information
- Type: Public
- Motto: Inspire Lifelong Learners, Create Successful People
- Established: 1927; 99 years ago
- Superintendent: Dr. Susan Coleman
- NCES District ID: 1726820

Students and staff
- Enrollment: 695
- Athletic conference: Little Nine (Niles Township elementary schools)
- District mascot: Cardinals
- Colors: Red; White

Other information
- Website: www.golf67.net

Golf School District 67 is located in Morton Grove, Illinois. The Village of Morton Grove is approximately 13 miles north of downtown Chicago. The district consists of two schools: Hynes Elementary School and Golf Middle School. Students in Pre-Kindergarten through fourth grade attend Hynes Elementary School, and those in grades five through eight attend Golf Middle School. The school district has an enrollment of approximately 695 students (as of 2022) and is served by 90 teachers and staff.

The school district serves students in parts of Morton Grove, Niles, and Glenview (Reserve at Glenview apartment community). Geographically the district also includes a portion of Skokie that lack residents. Despite its name, the district does not include any part of Golf, Illinois, although it did prior to 1982.

As of the 2000 census, the district's total population was 6,738, with 2,446 households.

The district serves approximately 695 students.

== Schools ==
District 67 has two schools:

- Hynes Elementary School (grades pre-K–4), 9000 Belleforte Ave., Morton Grove, IL 60053
- Golf Middle School (grades 5–8), 9401 Waukegan Rd., Morton Grove, IL 60053

Hynes Elementary School was built in 1957 and is named after former district teacher, principal and superintendent Irene E. Hynes.

The original Golf Elementary School was built in 1927 as a four-room school. It was expanded four times before being supplemented by Hynes Elementary School in 1957. Golf Junior High School was added in 1961. The Golf Middle School building remains at the site.

District 67 owns Frank Hren Discovery Park, which is adjacent to Golf Middle School. Frank P. Hren was a teacher and principal at the former Golf Junior High School, and the park was named in his honor.

The school district's administrative offices are in Golf Middle School.

After graduating, students continuing with public education attend Niles North High School (Niles Township High School District 219).

In August 2015, District 67 entered into the Classrooms First Collaborative For Curriculum – A World-Class Education For Our Children partnership with high school district 219. Goals of the Classrooms First initiative include focusing on literacy and on science, technology, engineering and mathematics (STEM) as a distinct part of elementary and secondary curricula, aligning curricula between the elementary and high school districts, creating operational efficiencies, providing increased access to educational infrastructure to the elementary school district, establishing a uniform system of curricular targets and accountability, and increasing high school and college readiness.

District 67 is within Community College District 535 (Oakton Community College), which has its main campus in Des Plaines, Illinois.

== Finances ==
The school district operates with a balanced budget, and no deficit reduction plan is required.

As is typical for Illinois school districts, District 67's primary source of revenue is from real estate tax revenues; over 88% of the district's revenues is from this source.

For Fiscal Year 2015 (July 1, 2015 – June 30, 2016), budgeted receipts for operating funds are $8,835,200, and budgeted expenditures for operating funds are $8,797,233. Budgeted receipts for all funds (including debt service) is $10,347,118; budgeted expenditures for all funds are $10,347,118.

The district undergoes an audit every year by an independent accounting firm.

For fiscal year 2015, the Illinois State Board of Education (ISBE) designated District 67's finances as being in the 'Financial Recognition' category, which is ISBE's highest ranking.

== External programs ==
District 67 is a member of the Niles Township District for Special Education (District 807).Home

The district also participates in the Niles Township ELL Parent Center.Index

== Leadership ==
The principal of Hynes Elementary School is Kelly Harper. The principal of Golf Middle School is Norman Susan Coleman is the District Superintendent; she began her tenure at District 67 on July 1, 2020.

District 67 is governed by a seven-member school board elected by district voters. Members serve without pay, normally for terms of four years. Elections are held at the Consolidated Election usually held on the first Tuesday in April of each odd-numbered year. Terms of members are staggered so there are three or four positions filled at each school board election. Vacancies created by death or resignation are filled by appointment (by the remaining board members) until the following election. School board members complete statutorily required training and participate in other education related training.

== Community ==
The school district is supported by an active parent-teacher association (School District 67 Parent Teacher Association),Golf PTA and by the Golf School District Foundation.Golf School District 67 Foundation

A district Community Engagement Committee works to develop community partnerships, engage community members on topics relevant to district decisions and planning, and involve parents and other community members in activities and educational initiatives.

District 67 is a member of the Illinois Association of School Boards.Directory of Member Districts | IASB

The district is also a member of the Morton Grove Chamber of Commerce Directory Alpha Search: g | Morton Grove Chamber of Commerce and Industry and the Niles Chamber of Commerce & Industry.Directory Alpha Search: G | Niles Chamber of Commerce and Industry

== Recognition ==
The district achieved Adequate Yearly Progress (AYP) every year since AYP's inception.

District schools received the Illinois Honor Roll Award for Academic Excellence in 2008, 2009, 2010, 2011, and 2012.

Golf Middle School recently received a Blue Ribbon Award from the Illinois Association for Health, Physical Education, Recreation, and Dance.

National School Boards Association Salute District: Technology.

The district was awarded the Bright Red Apple Award in 2012 and 2013.

In 2014, the Illinois Association of School Boards awarded its 'School Board Governance Recognition' to the District 67 School Board. The award is designed to acknowledge school boards that have engaged in activities and modeled behaviors leading to excellence in local school governance in support of quality public education.

Homefacts.com gave the district an overall 'A+' rating in 2014.

== History ==
The Golf school district is named after the original Golf School, and the Village of Golf that the school originally served. The first Golf School was a prototypical "one room country schoolhouse" that was little more than a wooden shed with windows. It had no electricity or indoor plumbing. The single room was expanded to four, then replaced by a Works Progress Administration-built concrete and masonry structure capable of serving hundreds of students.

During its time, the original Golf School was very much a rural institution, and presumably the only public-funded institute of primary/secondary education in its area at that time. The baby boom after World War II saw the landscape being converted from rural to suburban, and a sudden population growth. The Village of Golf was content to remain a hamlet, but the municipalities that surrounded it, Glenview, Morton Grove and Niles, expanded rapidly, consuming all unincorporated land. The prairie, forests and farmland that remained was rapidly developed for housing and shopping.

Hynes Elementary School joined the district in 1957, filling the distance between Golf School and Morton Grove School. In 1961, Golf Junior High School was built on the west side of the Golf School campus (the Golf School building was set back to the northeast corner of the parcel), and Golf School became Golf Elementary School. Shortly thereafter the Golf Junior High School building was expanded with modern, air-conditioned classrooms in the new wing. Golf Junior High School took students from Golf Elementary and Hynes Elementary schools, and sent graduates on to Niles North High School for secondary education.

By 1975 the baby boom population growth of students had turned into a population decline, and downsizing plans were enacted. The c. 1934 Golf Elementary School building was scheduled for demolition with no replacement. Hynes Elementary School became the only elementary school for the district, and Golf Junior High School (grades 6–8) became the 4-year Golf Middle School, accepting grades 5 through 8. The Village of Golf, after which the district was named, decided to send its children to public schools in Glenview.

Before the end of the 20th century the last working farm in District 67, Delaine Farm, had been converted into a housing development. In less than 70 years the demographics of District 67 have changed radically from rural and agrarian to suburban and professional.
