= Morton Grove School District 70 =

School district in Illinois, United States

Location
- 6200 Lake Street Morton Grove, Illinois, 60053; United States

District information
- Type: Public
- Grades: PreK–8
- Established: 1897
- Superintendent: Matt Condon
- NCES District ID: 1726850

Students and staff
- Students: 893
- District mascot: Warriors
- Colors: Blue; Gold

Other information
- Website: www.mgsd70.org

Morton Grove School District 70 is a school district headquartered in Morton Grove, Illinois, United States. It operates Park View School and primarily serves eastern Morton Grove.

== History ==
District 70 traces its founding back to 1897 with the construction of a school building at Capulina Avenue and School Street which later became known as Grove School. The school was enlarged and remodeled during the 1920s.

Grove School remained the districts sole school until 1952, with the opening of Park View School at 6200 Lake Street. Multiple additions were made to the school throughout the 1960s and 1970s.

The district opened Blanche Borg School at 8601 Menard Avenue in 1965, thus bringing the number of schools in the district to three schools.

The district closed Grove School in 1978, and the building was then converted into Morton Grove's village hall and police headquarters. The district then closed Blanche Borg School in 1982, and consolidated all students at Park View School.

Since the consolidation of all students at Park View School, the district has made multiple additions to the school, most notably in 1999, 2014, and 2026.
