= Orchard Place, Illinois =

Orchard Place
- Neighborhood
- Location of Orchard Place within Illinois
- Coordinates: 41°58′43″N 87°54′17″W
- Country: United States
- State: Illinois
- County: Cook
- Time zone: UTC-6 (CST)
  - Summer (DST): UTC-5 (CDT)

Orchard Place was a small unincorporated community in Cook County, Illinois, just west of Chicago. Established in the early 20th century, the community was primarily a rural area characterized by farmland and orchards, from which it derived its name. Orchard Place experienced modest growth throughout the early decades of the 1900s, developing into a quiet residential area.

In the 1940s, Orchard Place underwent significant changes due to the establishment of Orchard Place Airport, a military airfield created during World War II. The airfield later transitioned to commercial use and was eventually renamed O'Hare International Airport, now one of the busiest airports in the world. The expansion and development of the airport led to the absorption and dissolution of Orchard Place as an independent community.

== History ==
Settled by German immigrants in the 1840s, the area was originally known as Farwell before 1886, when the name was changed to Orchard Place. A post office opened in 1881 under the name Farwell and was renamed Orchard Place in 1886. The post office closed in 1935. It became a stop on the Wisconsin Central Railroad in 1887, when it received the name Orchard Place.

=== Orchard Field ===
In 1942, a large tract of farmland southwest of Higgins and Mannheim Roads was acquired by the War Production Board for the construction of a military air base and aircraft manufacturing facility. Douglas Aircraft built C-54 "Skymaster" cargo planes at the site. The airfield was named Orchard Place Airport/Douglas Field, and four runways were constructed for aircraft delivery. During the war, the 803 Special Depot stored fighter aircraft at the site.

After World War II, aircraft production ceased, and in 1946, the U.S. government transferred 1,080 acres of the airport to the City of Chicago. The city selected the location for a future commercial airport, purchasing additional land and renaming the site Orchard Field.

In 1949, the airfield was renamed O'Hare International Airport, in honor of Lieutenant Commander Edward "Butch" O'Hare, a United States Navy flying ace and Medal of Honor recipient.

By 1950, the nearby land was subdivided for residential development. The community extended roughly from Touhy Avenue (north) to Devon and Higgins Roads (south), and from Mannheim Road (west) to River Road (east). The Jane Addams Memorial Tollway was later constructed, forming a barrier that separated parts of the original community from the airport. Orchard Place was annexed to the City of Des Plaines by referendum in 1956.

== Orchard Place today ==
Today, Orchard Place is the southernmost neighborhood of Des Plaines. The legacy of its name survives in O’Hare’s IATA airport code, (FAA LID: ORD), and in the name of Orchard Place Elementary School. A house from the original community remains at the south end of Curtiss Street.

=== Cemeteries ===
Remnants of Orchard Place's past include small 19th-century cemeteries. The best known is Resthaven Cemetery, located on 1.5 acres on the south side of the airport, near a FedEx facility. It was founded by German settlers in 1840 and contains approximately 150 graves.

Other cemeteries include:

- St. John's Cemetery, removed in 2012 during an O'Hare expansion project
- Wilmer's Old Settler Cemetery, seized by the federal government in the 1950s
