= MCC Academy =

Muslim school in Illinois, United States

Muslim Community Center Academy (MCCA)

Location
- 8601 Menard Ave; Morton Grove, Illinois 60053; 42°2′16″N 87°46′16″W

Information
- Established: 1989
- Enrollment: 740 (2020)
- Website: mccchicago.org

Muslim Community Center Academy (MCCA) is a Muslim K-12 school in the Chicago metropolitan area and in Illinois. Pre-Kindergarten through 5th grade students attend classes in Skokie while 6th through 12th grade students attend classes in Morton Grove..

== History ==
The school was established in 1989 after the purchase of a former school building from Morton Grove School District 70. District 70 later tried to reverse the sale, but village residents approved the sale and the opening of the school in a referendum. The school began operations in August of the following year. It initially had grades Kindergarten through 2. 25 students were enrolled when the school opened.

At first the school had seven principals before 2002, and that year its enrollment count was 175. In 2002 Habeeb Quadri, the son of the founder of the MCC organization, became the principal. He later became the superintendent.

Since at least 2004 the school was teaching students from pre-kindergarten through 8th grade.

In early 2014 the school had 50 employees and 476 students. In 2014 Skokie School District 68 sold MCC a school building that was previously a private Jewish day school, Solomon Schechter Day School, and before that Sharp Corner School. That year MCC moved its elementary school students to that campus.

In 2018 MCCA had 129 students at the middle school level. That year, the Morton Grove village government agreed to allow high school students at the school, with new rules allowing up to 25 high school students to enter each year. The high school, MCCA College Prep, opened in 2018 with 11 9th grade students.

In 2020 the school had 740 students.

It also has a hifz program, which had 40 students in 2018.

== Campuses ==
The secondary campus has 26,035 square feet (2,418.7 m^{2}) of area and includes a mosque and a parking lot that can accommodate over 200 cars.

The elementary campus in Skokie retained the prayer room.

== Academics ==
Oakton Community College allows students of MCC at the high school level to take university-level classes.

== Athletics ==
In 2016 a girls' basketball team began to play in the Illinois Elementary School Association's league, making it the only hijab-wearing team.
