= Park Ridge-Niles School District 64 =

School district in Park Ridge, Illinois, USA

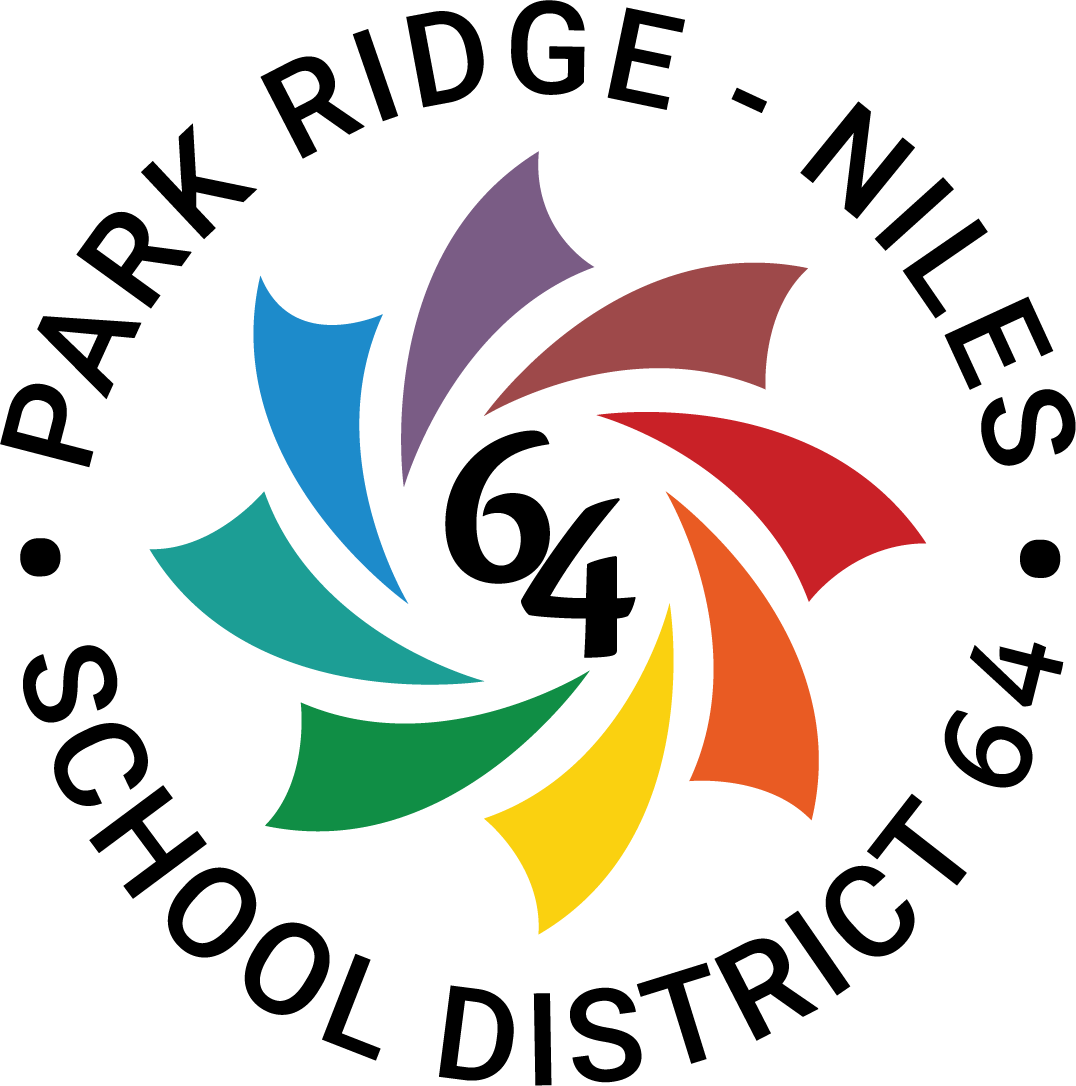

Address
- 8200 Greendale Ave Niles, Illinois, 60714; United States

District information
- Type: Public
- Grades: PreK–8
- Superintendent: Dr. Benjamin “Ben” Collins
- Asst. superintendent(s): Dr. Samantha Alaimo, Dr. Joel Martin
- Schools: 8
- NCES District ID: 1730840

Students and staff
- Students: 4,717

Other information
- Website: d64.org

District 64 is a school district serving students in Park Ridge and part of Niles, IL. The District employs more than 600 staff members who provide education for approximately 4,500 students. The District operates five elementary schools for grades K-5, two middle schools for grades 6-8, and an early childhood education center.

The district headquarters is the Jefferson Early Childhood Center at 8200 Greendale Ave in Niles.

== Schools ==
=== Middle schools ===
- Emerson Middle School (in Niles) — Named after Ralph Waldo Emerson, this is a three-story school building. At one time the district rented the facility to the Chicago Futabakai Japanese School, which used it as its campus. The middle school replaced an older building, Emerson Junior High School. Emerson is the largest school in the district, population and size.
- Lincoln Middle School (in Park Ridge)

=== Elementary schools ===
- Carpenter Elementary School (in Park Ridge)
- Field Elementary School (in Park Ridge)
- Franklin Elementary School (in Park Ridge)
- Roosevelt Elementary School (in Park Ridge)
- Washington Elementary School (Park Ridge)

=== Early childhood ===
- Jefferson School (in Niles)

== District leadership ==
District 64 is governed by a board of education composed of seven members, President Dr. Denise Pearl, Vice President Monica Milligan, Secretary Matt Doubleday, Phyllis Lubinski, Gareth Kennedy, Rachel Georgakis, and Demetri Touzios. The board's powers and duties include adopting, enforcing and monitoring district policies, managing the district's budget, and evaluating the performance of the superintendent.

The district's current superintendent is Dr. Benjamin "Ben" D. Collins who assumed powers on July 1, 2023, after being Principal at Maine South High School, part of Maine Township High School District 207, in Park Ridge, Il.

== History ==
The Goodspeed History of Cook County implies that the early history of schools of Park Ridge is unclear, but stated: "By 1860, several schools had been started in that vicinity. Among the first teachers were R.W. Gunnison, Miss Augusta Meacham, and George A. Follansbee."

By 1902, School District 2, Township 41 North, Range 12 East, "Park Ridge", had an "old building" constructed for $6,000 in 1868 on 0.6 acres (0.24 ha) and a "new building" constructed for $20,000 in 1893 on 6.0 acres (2.4 ha) near the southwest corner of township section 26.

With school district renumbering from township-wide to county-wide in 1901, Park Ridge's School District 2 became School District 64. In 1902 the district had a population of 2,112 people In the 1901–1902 school year, one principal oversaw 11 other teachers, but for the Autumn 1902 semester, a superintendent oversaw 8 teachers. At the time there were 5 operating schools in all of Maine Township.

The Maine Township High School District was organized in September 1902 and held school at Park Ridge until the high school building was completed.

Construction on Field, Lincoln, and Theodore Roosevelt schools began in 1929.

By 1958 schools in District 64 included Edison, Emerson Junior High, Field, Franklin, Jefferson, Lincoln Junior High, Madison, Merrill, and Washington.

== Notable alumni ==
- Hillary Clinton — She attended Field School from 1952 to 1959 (kindergarten to grade 6) and Emerson Junior High School from 1959 to 1961 (grades 7 and 8). In 1997, when Clinton was the First Lady, she visited this school at a reunion with her friends and teachers.
