= Niles North High School =

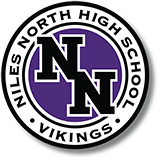

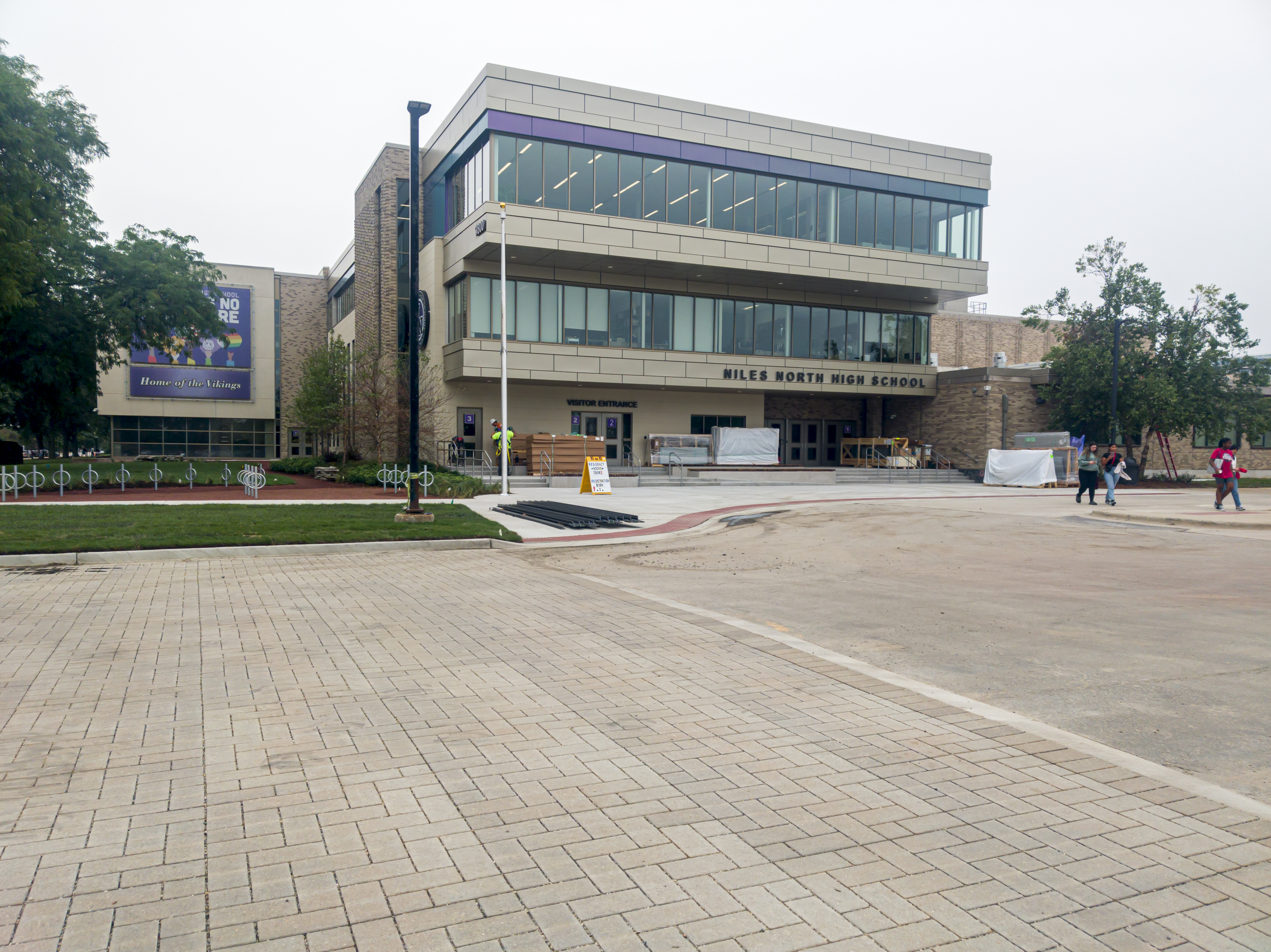
- Niles North High School in 2023

Location
- 9800 N. Lawler Avenue; Skokie, Illinois 60077; United States; 42.0596°N 87.7546°W

Information
- School type: Public, Secondary
- Opened: 1964
- Status: Open
- School district: Niles Township High School District 219
- NCES District ID: 1728530
- Superintendent: Thomas Moore
- NCES School ID: 172853002986
- Principal: Marlon Felton
- Teaching staff: 160.35 (FTE))
- Grades: 9-12
- Gender: coed
- Enrollment: 2,015 (2023-2024)
- Student to teacher ratio: 12.57
- Campus type: City: small
- Colors: purple white
- Athletics conference: Central Suburban League North
- Mascot: Vikings
- Newspaper: North Star News
- Yearbook: SAGA
- Website: official website

Niles North High School (NNHS), officially Niles Township High School North, is a public four-year high school located in Skokie, Illinois, a north suburb of Chicago, Illinois in the United States. It is part of Niles Township High School District 219, which also includes Niles West High School. Its feeder middle schools are Old Orchard Junior High, Oliver McCracken Middle School, East Prairie Elementary School, and Golf Middle School. Before being moved to a separate facility in Lincolnwood, Illinois, the Bridges Adult Transition program was hosted at the school.

== History ==
Rapid population growth in Skokie and surrounding communities during the 1950s led District 219 to plan a third high school. On February 6, 1960, township voters approved funds to construct the school on Lawler Avenue, west of Old Orchard Shopping Center.

Niles North opened in 1964 as the third high school in District 219, joining Niles East and Niles West. The new campus was formally dedicated on November 1, 1964.

During the late 1970s amid declining enrollment, District 219 considered the future of both Niles North and Niles East. In 1978, a proposed sale of the Niles North campus to Oakton Community College generated controversy and legal challenges. The district ultimately retained Niles North, while Niles East closed in 1980. Students from Niles East were subsequently absorbed into Niles North and Niles West.

The future of Niles North was once again reconsidered in 1990, when District 219 studied a proposal to close the school and construct a 53-classroom expansion at Niles West. An administrative report estimated that the plan could save the district approximately $23 million over five years. The proposal was not implemented and Niles North remained open.

== Athletics ==
Niles North competes in the Central Suburban League and Illinois High School Association. Its mascot is the Viking. Niles North's rival is Niles West High School. The crosstown rivalry is referenced as the "Skokie Skirmish."

== Activities ==
The Niles North chess team has won the Illinois High School Association State Championship in 2006, 2010, and 2012.

The Niles North Robotics Team (333) won the Illinois State Tournament In their 2013-14 inaugural season,. In the 2014–15, all 8 of the Niles North Teams qualified for the Illinois State Competition, with one of the teams, 333M, being crowned the Illinois State Tournament Champions and competing at VEX Worlds. In 2015-16, eight of the nine Niles North teams qualified for the Illinois State Competition. Three teams qualified and competed at the U.S. Robotics Competition; one team was crowned the Illinois State Tournament Champion; one team was crowned the Illinois State Design Award Champions & the Illinois State Robot Skills Champions; three teams competed at VEX Worlds, with one being a Semifinalist in their division.

== Notable alumni ==
- Bushra Amiwala, (2016) American activist and politician
- Jerry Avenaim (1979), fashion photographer
- Mike Byster (1977), mathematician
- Jonathan Carroll, politician
- Gregg Edelman, Broadway and movie actor
- Nancy Lee Grahn, actress
- Erin Heatherton, model
- Lynn Holly Johnson, ice skater and actress
- Demetria Kalodimos (1977), TV anchorperson
- Jonathan Kite, actor
- Mike Krasny, businessperson
- Paul Lisnek (1976), attorney, author, and TV personality
- Abdel Nader, former NBA player
- Brent Novoselsky, former NFL player
- Kevin Olickal (2011), Illinois State Representative for the 16th district
- Noam Pikelny, banjo player
- Eric Rosen, chess master and streamer
- Joel Pollak (1995), journalist
- Connor Price, actor
- Esther Povitsky (2006), comedian and actress
- Elaine Quijano, broadcast journalist
- Marc Selz (1998), film director and producer
- Calla Urbanski (1978), Olympic figure skater
- Barrington Wade (2016), NFL player
