= Niles Township High School District 219 =

School district in Illinois, United States

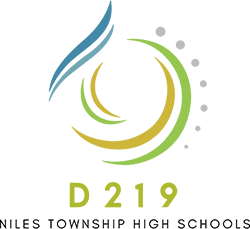

Location
- 7700 Gross Point Rd. Skokie, Illinois; United States

District information
- Type: Public secondary district
- Grades: 9–12
- Established: 1936
- Superintendent: Tom Moore
- NCES District ID: 1728530

Students and staff
- Students: 4,619

Other information
- Website: www.niles219.org

Niles Township High School District 219 is a public secondary school district in the U.S. state of Illinois. In the Niles Township, District 219 serves the educational requirements of the suburban communities of Lincolnwood, parts of Morton Grove, Niles, and Skokie, in the north of Cook County, Illinois.

The outstanding art-and-science successes of District 219 include the Kennedy Center for the Performing Arts declaring the Arts Program of D219 as the best of its kind in the nation in 2007. Moreover, besides the success of Niles West H.S. in the Science Olympiad, District 219 claims two Nobel laureates as alumnae.

In November 2022, District 219 was the first U.S. school district to offer Assyrian-language (Note: The Illinois State Board of Education, in its State Course Catalog, notes in each of the course descriptions for Assyrian: "Assyrian language (synonymous with Aramaic, Syriac, Chaldean)". For these languages, see: Neo-Aramaic languages (also called Syriac) and Suret (also called Chaldean).) courses upon their inclusion to the Illinois State Course Catalogue; the population of District 219 is approximately thirty per cent (30%) Assyrian.

== Geography ==
District 219 is geographically demarcated by Central Street on the north, McCormick Boulevard on the east, Devon Avenue on the south, and Harlem Avenue on the west. Among the notable tourist and educational sites in the district are the Illinois Holocaust Museum & Education Center and the Leaning Tower of Niles.

== Board of education ==
There are seven members of the district board, each elected to a four-year term. There is no limit on the number of terms a member may hold.

The board for the 2024-2025 school year is:

| President | Ken Durr | 2027 |
| Vice President | Naema Abraham | 2025 |
| Secretary | Elana Jacobs | 2025 |
| Member | Amber Wood | 2027 |
| Member | Celia Stennett | 2027 |
| Member | David Ko | 2027 |
| Member | Joe Nowik | 2025 |

== Schools ==
- Niles North High School
- Niles West High School
- Niles Central High School

=== Other Facilities ===
- Bridges Adult Transition Center

=== Former schools ===
- Niles East High School (1938–80)

== Labor relations ==
The district and its employees have had a long history of labor problems, dating back to the 1960s.

The first strike authorization by teachers came in October 1966, when teachers represented by the American Federation of Teachers voted to authorize a strike in order to secure collective bargaining rights. Teachers again authorized a strike in May 1967 over salary demands. This time, a strike did take place. 85 teachers crossed picket lines, and over 150 parents entered the school to teach. A court ordered an end to the strike the day after it started. Despite the court order, 200 teachers refused to return to school, with 100 calling in "sick". After two days of disruption, the strike was called off by local union officials.

In May 1970, the teachers again authorized a strike over salary. While negotiations continued throughout 1970 and into 1971, the authorization to strike was reaffirmed in March 1971. The strike threat continued into the 1971–72 school year.

Teachers again authorized a strike in September 1973 over payment for non-teaching time. Teachers did follow through with their strike threat despite an offer of 8% increase in salary. After five days, teachers accepted a contract with an 8% pay increase in the first year, and a gradually increasing pay increase throughout the life of the three-year contract.

In September 1976, the teachers union again authorized a strike, this time at the cost of seven days of school. When the strike took place, teachers were threatened with firing, which a judge requested the school board delay. This strike ended after seven days.

1979 saw another strike, though classes were able to resume on a modified schedule with teachers who crossed the picket line and substitutes. After 15 days, the strike was ended with double-digit salary increases for teachers.

A 1985 strike lasting 11 days ended after the teachers and Board of Education submitted to an arbitrator to solve final details of the contract.

The remainder of the 1980s and early 1990s remained relatively quiet. 1996 saw the next strike action. The Board of Education tried to force teachers back to work, claiming the strike was illegal during arbitration sessions, though teachers remained on strike. As the strike wore on, some of the fall sports teams were forced to forfeit their final regular season games and their state playoff games. The situation worsened when it was learned that the federal mediator had taken a week off to attend a conference at a resort. The Illinois Labor Relations Board publicly condemned both sides for failing to work in earnest to end the strike. By November 2, the District began announcing plans to replace striking teachers by as early as November 18. Parental involvement eventually helped end the strike on November 4 after 14 days. The final contract was ratified in January 1997, with the district stating an estimated cost of the strike at US$300,000, including a need to sweep areas for electronic eavesdropping devices.
