= D74 =

D74 may refer to:

- D. 74, String Quartet No. 6 in D major by Franz Schubert (1813)
- D-74 122 mm field gun, Soviet field gun
- HMS Hogue (D74), Battle-class destroyer of the Royal Navy commissioned during WWII
- HMS Wanderer (D74), Admiralty modified W class destroyer built for the Royal Navy
- Lincolnwood D74, public school district headquartered Lincolnwood, Illinois, US
