= Atour Sargon =

Assyrian American activist

- ܐܵܬܘܿܪ ܣܲܪܓܘܿܢ

Member of the Lincolnwood, Illinois Board of Trustees
- Incumbent
- Assumed office May 7, 2019

Personal details
- Born: Chicago, Illinois
- Citizenship: American
- Spouse: Peter Sargon
- Children: 2
- Education: University of Illinois at Urbana Champaign (BA); Northwestern University (MA)

Atour Toma Sargon, (Syriac: ܐܵܬܘܿܪ ܬܐܘܿܡܵܐ ܣܲܪܓܘܿܢ) also referred to as Atour Sargon, (Syriac: ܐܵܬܘܿܪ ܣܲܪܓܘܿܢ) is an Assyrian American activist. She is the first ethnic Assyrian to be elected to the Lincolnwood Board of Trustees and the first Assyrian woman elected to a political office in Illinois.

== Early life and education ==
Sargon is a first generation Assyrian American. She grew up in Chicago before moving to Lincolnwood with her family at the age of 15. She first attended Theodore Roosevelt High School in Chicago, then transferred to Niles West High School. She earned a B.A. in political science at the University of Illinois at Urbana–Champaign.

After graduating college, she worked as a legal assistant for a law firm in Chicago. She eventually married and had two children. She also went back to school, earning a M.A in public policy and administration at Northwestern University. Afterwards, she became the first vice president of Lincolnwood School District 74 Parent Teachers Association.

== Career ==
=== Election ===
Sargon's early interest in political activism first came from her parents, who she said volunteered to the local Assyrian community despite also working many hours. She has also cited her grandmother as an early source of inspiration. She briefly put her political ambitions aside due to her job, motherhood, and first vice presidency of the Lincolnwood PTA. In 2017, she was mentored by Illinois Congresswoman Jan Schakowsky (D-IL), who encouraged her to return to politics. She later stated that, despite her political educational background, she had not considered running for office until she met Schakowsky and heard the story of how Schakowsky had entered politics due to her concerns about unsafe practices in the food industry. She was also encouraged to enter politics by Illinois State Senator Ram Villivalam, whose successful campaign she'd previously volunteered with.

Schakowsky also encouraged Sargon to attend training at the Illinois Women's Institute for Leadership Training Academy, a program that encourages women to pursue political positions. She completed training with the program in 2019.

In 2019, she ran for a position on Lincolnwood's six-member Board of Trustees on the Alliance for Lincolnwood ticket. The other candidates on the ticket were Craig Klatzco and Jesal Patel. She and the other Alliance for Lincolnwood candidates were endorsed by the American Middle East Voters Alliance. On April 2, 2019, she was elected to the Board. Upon being sworn in on May 7 of that year, she became the first Assyrian to hold the position, and the first Assyrian woman elected to a political office in Illinois.

She won the election with 1,435 votes. This was seen as a large amount by Lincolnwood standards. The incumbent mayor at the time had received 1,167 votes, and her fellow Alliance for Lincolnwood candidates received 1,329 and 1,328 votes respectively. Their three opponents on the Lifelong for Lincolnwood ticket received 849 votes, 847 votes, and 843 votes respectively. She credited the political engagement of the Assyrian community as a reason for her landslide win. Many canvassing and outreach efforts for her campaign were organized by Vote Assyrian, an organization that aims to increase political engagement among Assyrian Americans.

=== As trustee ===
Aside from her prior support of issues pertaining to ethnic Assyrians, Sargon has taken up several other positions upon the start of her political career.

==== Campaign ====
During a public address for her trustee election campaign, Sargon condemned alleged threatening comments made by a preceding Lincolnwood trustee towards a female colleague. She said that it was a common behavior from their local government that needed to be removed through leading by example. At the same address, she also expressed support for programs that increase diversity advocacy.

Sargon was also the subject of personal attacks on social media during the election by one of her Lifelong for Lincolnwood opponents and incumbent Mayor Barry Bass. Bass compared her to Assyrian American Representative Anna Eshoo (incorrectly referring to her as "Pamela Isho"), alleging she had "forgotten her cause" in relation to her Assyrian identity after being elected, implying that Sargon would do the same if elected.

==== Worker protection ====
Sargon and others on the board proposed a meeting to discuss raising the minimum wage and changing sick time rules for workers in Lincolnwood in September 2019. The meeting was eventually approved and presented to the rest of the board for a vote in January 2020. She voted in favor of adopting Cook County's sick leave requirements in Lincolnwood. She and two others also voted in favor of raising Lincolnwood's minimum wage beyond the wage set by Cook County. She was quoted as saying:

"The Village Board was presented with overwhelming data and information indicating the positive impacts that raising the minimum wage and having paid sick leave would have on the workers, public health and businesses in Lincolnwood. My vote and advocacy represent both my personal opinion -- that it is a moral obligation for us to raise the minimum wage, as well as the opinion of a majority of our community who have spoken loud and clear in favor of the Cook County Opt-In."

==== Supreme Court of Illinois endorsement ====
Sargon formally endorsed candidate Daniel Epstein during the 2020 Illinois judicial elections for the Supreme Court of Illinois

==== Council–manager government ====
Sargon has expressed support for the idea of having a workshop in order to explore the possibility of converting Lincolnwood into a council–manager government, both during her campaign and after being elected.

==== COVID-19 response ====
In March 2020, Sargon and several other board members met to discuss the potential implementation of new rules regarding face masks and coverings amidst the COVID-19 pandemic. She supported the new measures, saying:

"We are not in the clear...there are states across the nation that reopened very quickly and have seen spikes and our state and our community have been able to get ahead of the curve but we're definitely not in the clear yet."

==== Other positions ====
In June 2019, Sargon voted in favor of a proposal to restripe an area next to a business owned by her fellow trustee and Alliance for Lincolnwood member, Craig Klatzko. The measure itself was controversial due to the potential "negative message" of restriping an area close to a business owned by a village official. Mayor Barry Bass ended up casting the tie-breaking vote against the measure.

Sargon and three other trustees voted against the construction of a video game café in Lincolnwood, citing public discontent, personal concerns about video game addiction, and the close proximity of the proposed café to religious institutions.

== Assyrian activism ==
Sargon has been involved with Assyrian activism before, during, and after the start of her political career.

=== Early activism ===
As a student at the University of Illinois, she became a founding member of the Assyrian Chaldean Syriac Student Movement.

=== Civic engagement in the Assyrian community ===
She was the first Assyrian woman elected in Illinois and is on the advisory board of the American Middle East Voters Alliance PAC. She is no longer endorsed by Vote Assyrian due to her policies.

Sargon joined Senator Ram Villivalam as a guest during the Illinois Senate's 101st General Assembly session in April 2019. Senator Villivalam discussed her accomplishments as an Assyrian female activist. He also said that they "had been discussing the next steps in her public service career" and that "she [Sargon] has committed to not running for State Senate, and I [Villivalam] am very appreciative of that."

In September 2019, Sargon, along with Senator Ram Villivalam and representatives from Vote Assyrian, addressed the public about the importance of civic engagement among the Assyrian American Community.

In July 2020, Sargon joined Congresswoman Jan Schakowsky, Chicago Mayor Lori Lightfoot, former Second Lady of the United States Jill Biden, and New Mexico Governor Michelle Lujan Grisham to represent the Assyrian American community as a co-chair of the 19th Annual Ultimate Women's Power Lunch.

=== Vote Assyrian census project ===
Sargon is a proponent of Vote Assyrian's 2020 census project. The project encourages Assyrian Americans to fill out the 2020 census to get an accurate population count of Assyrians residing in the United States. In a discussion with Borderless Magazine, she stressed the importance of the project, saying:

"Since the census is only every 10 years and because the numbers were so low in 2010, we knew it should take precedence and be a priority for us. Growing up in this country, [we have] opportunities and resources that our parents, being new to the country, didn't know about. So it's really incumbent upon us to make sure we get accurate numbers this year."

=== Drug addiction and mental health advocacy ===
In September 2020, Sargon was the moderator of a panel discussion among several Assyrian medical experts hosted by the Assyrian Student Association of Chicago. The discussion focused on drug abuse and mental health. It particularly focused on the stigma that surrounds them, as well as resources that can be utilized, and fostering public education of the issue.

=== Public addresses ===
In May 2020, Sargon was a guest speaker at the Assyrian Student Association of Chicago's class of 2020 virtual graduation ceremony. She specifically addressed the experiences that many Assyrian students endure in the United States. She also discussed the effort that comes with building a reputation in a community, the impact of social media, and the necessity of each person to be a consistent advocate for their causes of interest. Her final message was a word of encouragement for younger Assyrians to be more civically engaged and to find methods of contributing to their community in ways that interest them.
