= Koudounis =

Koudounis is a surname. Notable people with the surname include:

- Christo Dimitri Koudounis (1923–2010), British cinematographer
- John S. Koudounis (fl. 1988), American business executive
