= John S. Koudounis =

American business executive

- Born: John Spiro Koudounis; Chicago, Illinois, US
- Education: Brown University
- Occupations: President & CEO
- Years active: 1984–present
- Employer: Calamos Investments

John Spiro Koudounis is an American business executive who currently works as the president and chief executive officer (CEO) of Calamos Investments. He previously was employed as the president and CEO of Mizuho Securities USA Inc., a subsidiary of the Japanese banking and holding company Mizuho Financial Group.

== Early life and education ==
Raised in Chicago, Koudounis attended Niles West High School in Skokie, Illinois, where he played basketball and football. He interned for Senator John Chafee and at Kidder Peabody, where he worked during the Black Monday stock market crash in 1987. In 1988, he graduated from Brown University in Providence, Rhode Island, with a double major in International Diplomacy and Economics.

== Career ==
Koudounis began his financial career at Merrill Lynch in 1988, immediately after graduating from Brown University. He then joined ABN AMRO's North American branch in 1997, where he spent 12 years as the head of fixed income.

In 2008, Koudounis joined Mizuho Securities USA Inc. as executive managing director and head of fixed income, overseeing trading, sales, and investment banking activities. In 2010, he was appointed president and CEO, becoming the youngest CEO of a Wall Street firm at that time.

In early 2016, Koudounis was named CEO of Calamos Investments, an investment firm headquartered in Naperville, Illinois. He was appointed by the firm's founder John Calamos, Sr. as part of Calamos's succession plan.

Koudounis is the founder of the Chicago CEO COVID-19 Coalition, an organization created in 2020 during the COVID-19 pandemic to provide relief for the city and bring Chicago's business leaders together. The coalition distributed over $1.5 million in proceeds from its televised fundraising.

Koudounis is a member of the Leadership Council at Concordia and the Bretton Woods Committee. He is a member of the board of trustees of the National Hellenic Museum, and an executive advisory board member for the SEAL Future Foundation. He is a founding board member and executive committee member of The Hellenic Initiative. He is Chairman of the Metropolis of Chicago Foundation. In 2016, he was inducted as an Archon of the Ecumenical Patriarchate in the Order of St. Andrew.

== Personal life ==
John Spiro Koudounis was born in 1966 and raised in Lincolnwood, Illinois, the son of George and Dina Koudounis. His father, George, was a United States Navy veteran of World War II.

Koudounis is married to Joanne Koudounis and the couple have twin daughters. Koudounis maintains residences and offices in both New York and Chicago. Outside of his professional career, he maintains an interest in global leadership and macroeconomic policy.

== See also ==
- Financial services
- List of Brown University people
