= Lincolnwood Town Center =

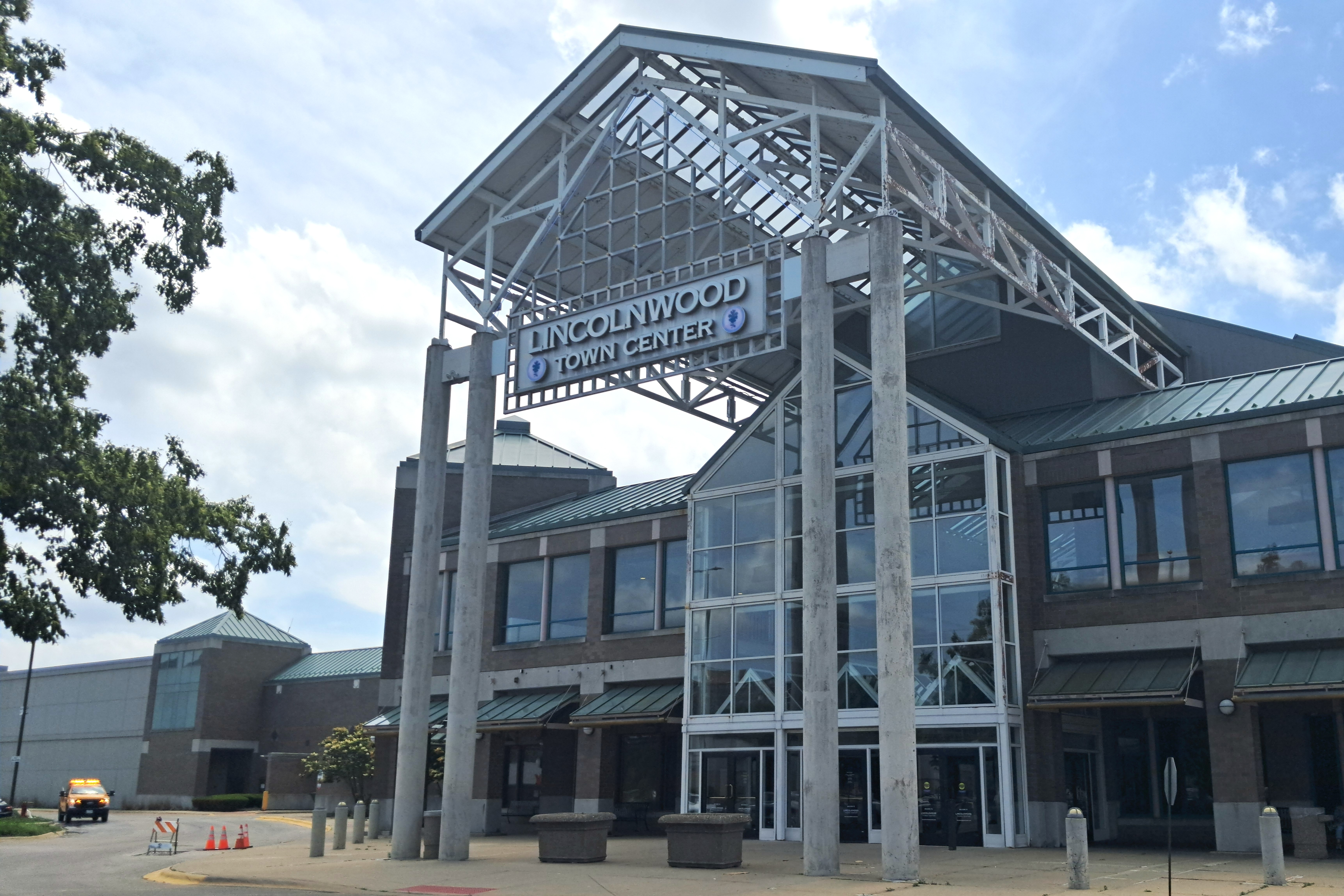
- Main entrance in 2026
- Location: Lincolnwood, Illinois, United States
- Coordinates: 42.01°N 87.7138°W
- Opened: March 15, 1990; 36 years ago
- Closed: July 23, 2026
- Manager: Friedman Real Estate
- Num. of stores: 83
- Num. of anchor tenants: 2
- Floor area: 421,000 square feet (39,112.2 m^{2})
- Floors: 2
- Public transit: CTA, Pace
- Website: Official website at the Wayback Machine (last available archive)

Lincolnwood Town Center was a shopping mall located in Lincolnwood, Illinois. The mall opened in March 1990. It featured three anchor stores at its peak: Carson's and Kohl's. The mall is managed by Friedman Real Estate, while the property itself is owned by Prairie Ridge Development and Xroads Real Estate Advisors.

== History ==
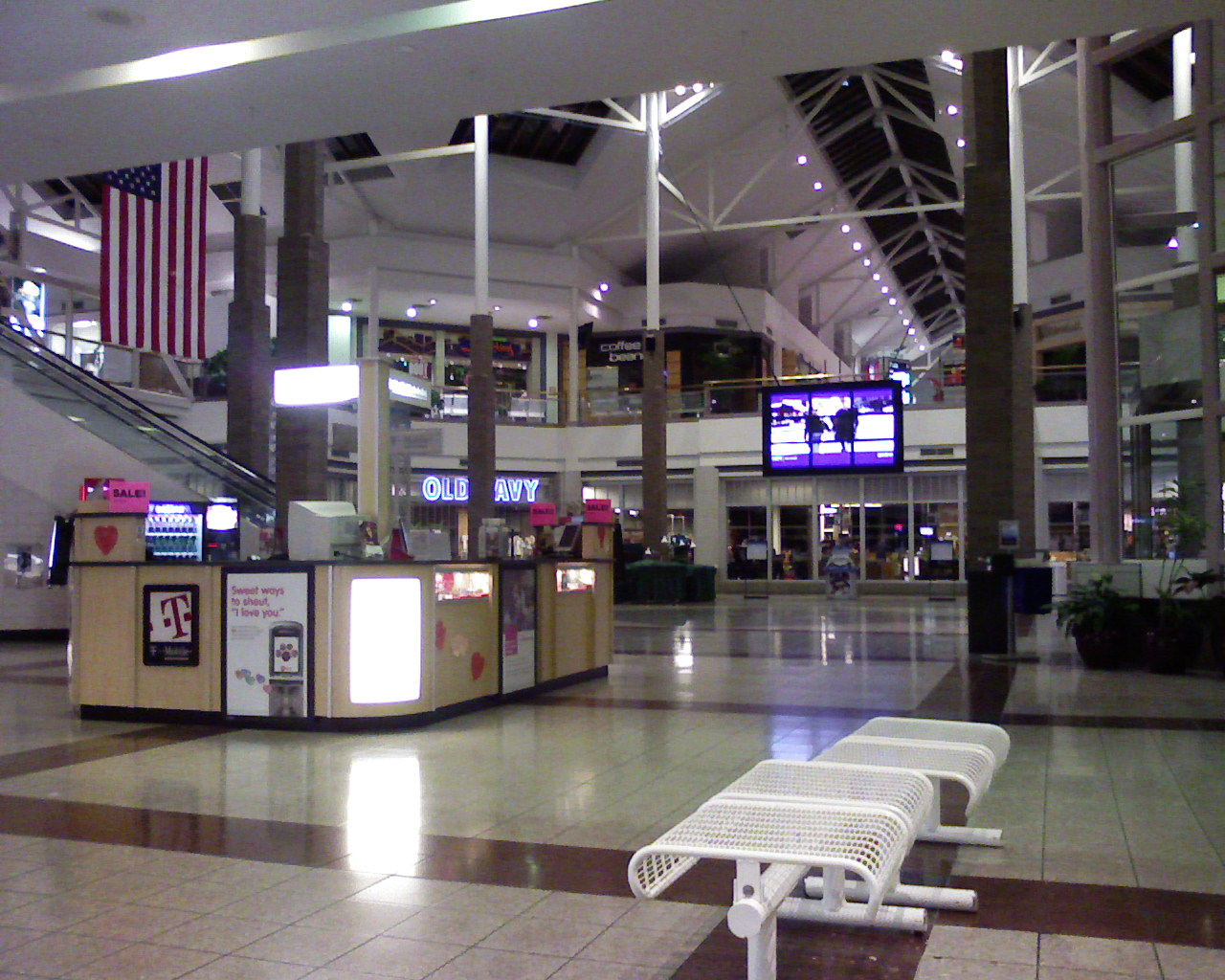
Mall interior (2007)

The site of Lincolnwood Town Center was formerly occupied by the headquarters of Bell & Howell. Developers Melvin Simon & Associates (now known as Simon Property Group and Chicago-based Hawthorn Realty first proposed to build a 1.2-million-square-foot (110,000 m^{2}) mall on the site in 1985, but the plan was turned down by city trustees. A second plan, calling for a smaller shopping mall and offices, was approved in 1987 after then-mayor Frank Chulay cast the tie-breaking vote.

Upon opening in 1990, the mall featured two anchor stores, both of which were Chicago-based department stores: Madigan's and Carson Pirie Scott (later known as Carson's), with space for up to 90 mall shops within 430,000 square feet (40,000 m^{2}) of total shop space. Representatives of Melvin Simon & Associates noted that the mall's development was indicative of a trend toward building malls within urban settings as opposed to suburbs.

Madigan's closed in 1991 after only a year in business, and was replaced that same year by J. C. Penney. This store was closed in 2001, and in 2002, it was converted to Kohl's.

In 2018, the Carson's store was shuttered following the bankruptcy of parent company The Bon-Ton. Following this announcement, an article published by RE Journal analyzed several Chicago-area malls which were all about to lose a Carson's store, and noted that Lincolnwood Town Center posed a risk of tenancy loss given its smaller size compared to other area malls.

TheRoomPlace opened in the former Carson's spot in August 2019.

In June 2021, the Washington Prime Group, the mall's parent company, filed for chapter 11 bankruptcy. The announcement came during the COVID-19 pandemic, which had greatly limited the amount of foot traffic in the mall.

In 2022, the Lincolnwood village board proposed a plan to redevelop the mall and its adjacent land into a mixed-use commercial, residential, and entertainment space. The plans were spurred by rising vacancies in the mall. The village at one point explored leveraging eminent domain to take ownership of the mall.

In December 2025, Prairie Ridge Development and Xroads Real Estate Advisors acquired the property for $12.3 million. In April 2026, the village board approved a plan to redevelop the property into a large retail store, an automobile dealer, and other commercial or retail spaces. In April, the village announced the mall would be demolished in three phases beginning sometime in May. The mall's food court and most smaller businesses closed by May 1. Old Navy remained open until the mid-section of the mall was demolished, while Kohl's is expected to remain open until the final phase of demolition.

A small portion of the enclosed mall remained accessible for Old Navy, whose manager said the store had not received a notice to vacate and raised concerns about customer access if demolition of the mall began.

Demolition was initially expected to begin in May 2026, but was delayed to June. The mall officially closed on July 23 with the exception of Kohl's.

== Bus routes ==
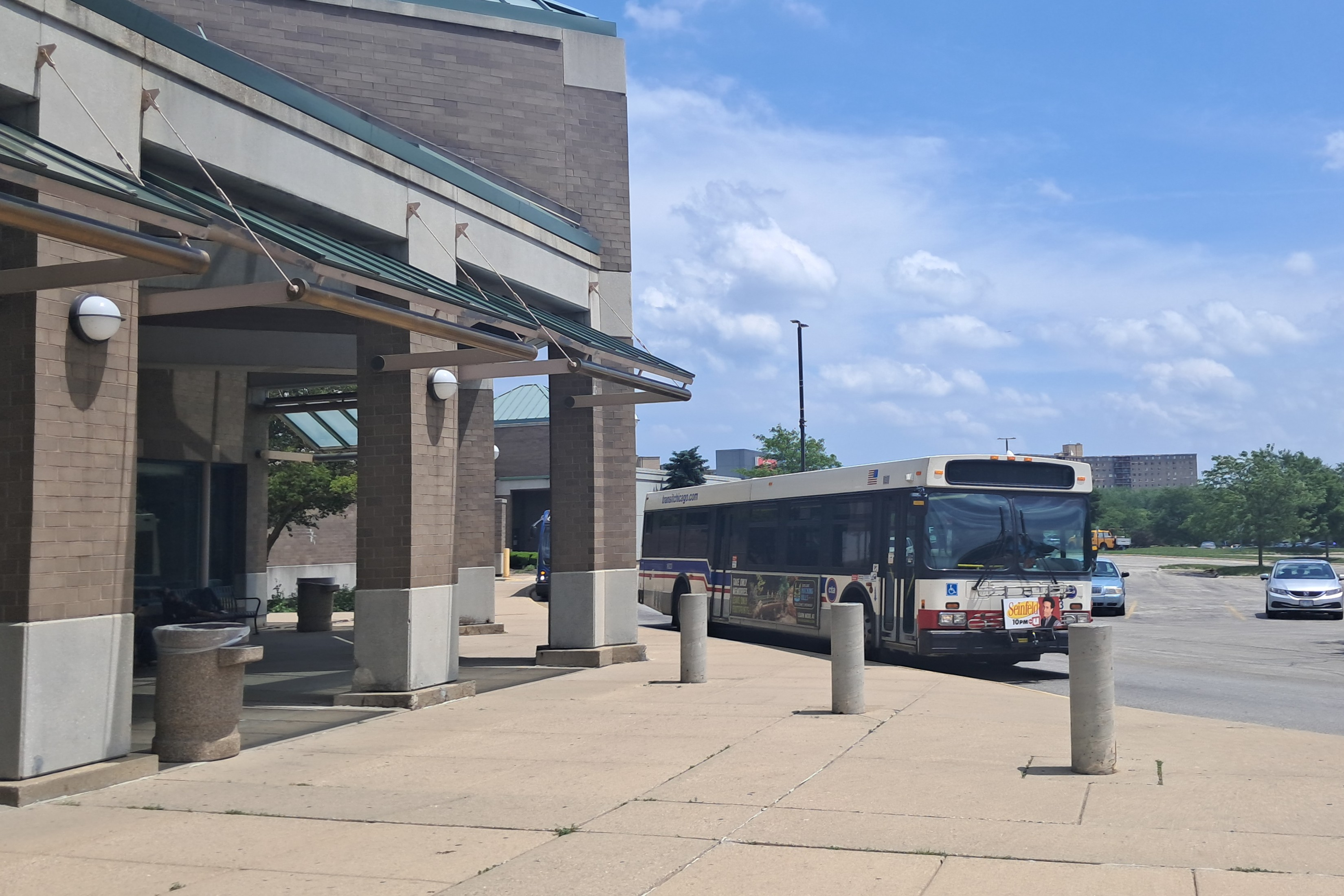
Bus stop at the entrance of the Lincolnwood Town Center

CTA

- 82 Kimball/Homan
- 96 Lunt (weekdays only)

Pace

- 210 Lincoln Avenue (weekdays only)
- 290 Touhy Avenue
