= Laura Crane =

American judge (born 1981)

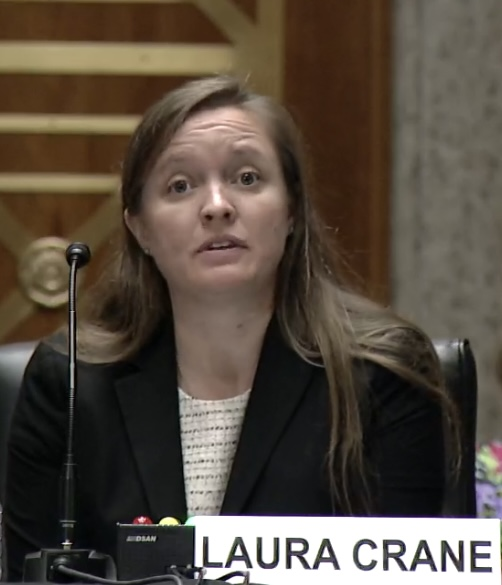

Associate Judge of the Superior Court of the District of Columbia
- Incumbent
- Assumed office January 17, 2023
- Appointed by: Joe Biden
- Preceded by: Steven N. Berk

Personal details
- Born: June 4, 1981 (age 44) Rochester, New York, U.S.
- Education: Duke University (BA); Washington University in St. Louis (JD)

Laura E. Crane (born June 4, 1981) is an American lawyer who has served as an associate judge of the Superior Court of the District of Columbia since 2023. Previously she was an assistant United States attorney from 2014 to 2023.

== Education ==
Crane earned a Bachelor of Arts in English and Spanish from Duke University in 2003 and a Juris Doctor from the Washington University School of Law in St. Louis in 2009.

== Career ==
From 2010 to 2012, Crane worked as an associate at Cravath, Swaine & Moore in New York City. From 2012 and 2013, she served as a law clerk for Judge James Boasberg of the United States District Court for the District of Columbia. She was a senior associate at Wilmer Cutler Pickering Hale and Dorr in 2013 and 2014. Crane joined the United States Attorney's Office for the District of Columbia as an assistant United States attorney, where she served from 2014 to 2023.

=== D.C. Superior Court service ===
On July 14, 2022, President Joe Biden nominated Crane to be a judge of the Superior Court of the District of Columbia. Biden nominated Crane to the seat vacated by Judge Steven N. Berk, who retired on November 1, 2021. On September 21, 2022, a hearing on her nomination was held before the Senate Homeland Security and Governmental Affairs Committee. On September 28, 2022, her nomination was favorably reported out of committee by voice vote en bloc, with Senators Rick Scott and Josh Hawley voting "no" on record. On December 15, 2022, her nomination was confirmed in the Senate by voice vote. She was sworn in on January 17, 2023.

Legal offices
Preceded by Steven N. Berk	Judge of the Superior Court of the District of Columbia; 2023–present	Incumbent
