= Niles East High School =

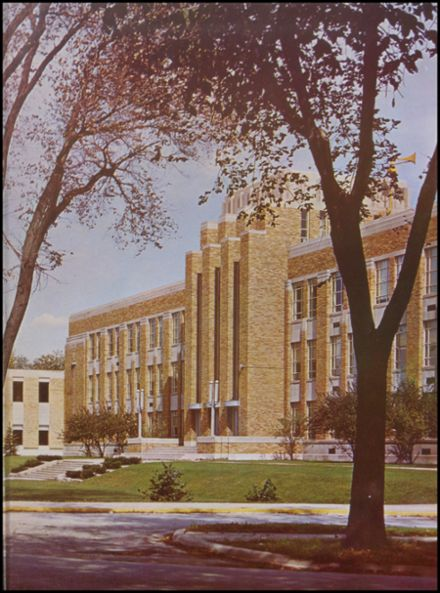
- Niles East High School circa 1965.

Location
- 7701 Lincoln Avenue; Skokie, Illinois; United States; 42.02149°N 87.74951°W

Information
- School type: Public Secondary
- Opened: 1938
- Status: Closed
- Closed: 1980
- School district: Niles Township High School District 219
- Grades: 9–12
- Gender: Coed
- Campus: Suburban
- Colours: blue gold
- Athletics conference: Suburban League (1952-1972); Central Suburban League (1972-1980)
- Nickname: Trojans
- Newspaper: NileHiLite
- Nobel laureates: Robert Horvitz (2002, Medicine and Physiology); Martin Chalfie (2008, Chemistry)

Niles East High School was a public 4–year school in Skokie, Illinois. Operated by Niles Township High School District 219, Niles East was first opened in 1938 and closed after the 1979–1980 school year. Niles East's sister schools Niles West High School and Niles North High School remain open. The school was known as Niles Township High School until Niles West High School opened in 1958. The school sports teams were named the Trojans. Much of the school complex were demolished by Oakton College in 1993.

== History ==
High school education began in Niles Township in 1931, when Niles Center High School opened in rented space at Lincoln School with about 50 students. As enrollment grew, voters created Niles Township High School District 219 in 1936 and approved funding for a permanent high school.

The district purchased a 21-acre site in 1937, and a new Niles Township High School building was constructed in 1938 with federal assistance. In January 1939, 457 students moved into the new building. The first graduating class following the move consisted of 53 students.

The school was initially known as Niles Township High School and was sometimes called "Nilehi". Its athletic teams were known as the Trojans. The surrounding village, then called Niles Center, was renamed Skokie in 1940.

Rapid population growth in Skokie and surrounding communities after World War II caused enrollment to increase substantially. By 1950, the school enrolled about 1,000 students, and continued growth led District 219 to construct a second campus.

Niles West High School opened during the 1958-1959 school year, after which the original campus became known as Niles East. Niles North High School opened in 1964 as the district continued to grow.

By the 1970s, enrollment in District 219 had begun to decline. In 1975, the school board announced plans to close Niles East, a decision that remained controversial among some students, parents, and community members. The board formally reaffirmed its decision in 1979.

On the evening of November 2, 1978, then President Jimmy Carter attended a "Get out the Vote" Rally at Niles East, where he was given an honorary diploma from the school.

Niles East completed its final school year in 1980, after which its students and programs were redistributed to Niles West and Niles North.

== After closure ==
After the high school closed, Oakton Community College began operating a branch campus in the Niles East building in the fall of 1980. Oakton later purchased the site from District 219 in 1989. Much of the former Niles East building was demolished by Oakton in the spring of 1993 to make way for a new campus building, which was completed in 1995. The only remaining portions of Niles East as of 2017 were the courtyard flagpole and the basement beneath the gymnasium which was used for storage.

Centre East for the Performing Arts operated in the former Niles East auditorium until the North Shore Center for the Performing Arts opened at 9501 Skokie Boulevard in 1996.

== Pop culture ==
After its closing in 1980, exterior and interior shots of the school were used in scenes from films such as Risky Business (1983) and the John Hughes films Sixteen Candles (1984), Weird Science (1985), and Pretty in Pink (1986).

== School Songs ==
=== Fight Song ===
Nilehi, Nilehi,
Go out and win this game,
We'll help you try.
The Trojans were a mighty race,
They fought with lots of vim.
Let's keep our fighting spirit and we'll win!
Let's go now!
Gold and Blue,
We're true to you,
We'll stand behind you always to a man.
Let's keep our colors flying high,
Our motto is to do or die,
Let's win this game, Nilehi!
Let's go, Nilehi!
Let's go, Trojans!
Fight hard, Nilehi!
VICTORY IS OURS!!

=== Alma Mater ===
Gold and Blue

Gold and Blue we sing to you
To you we bring our hearts so true
When we go off to College, we will think of you old school
Where we gained lots of knowledge and learned the golden rule
Though years may come and years may go
Deep in our hearts we'll always know
That there's only one real high school
And so we sing anew
We love you Gold and Blue

== Athletics ==
Niles East competed as a member of the Central Suburban League from 1972 until its closing in 1980. It was always a member of the Illinois High School Association (IHSA), which governs most athletic competition in Illinois. The IHSA currently recognizes Niles West High School as the caretaker of Niles East's competitive history. The following teams finished in the top four of their respective IHSA state championship tournament:

- Baseball: 2nd place (1957–58)
- Gymnastics (boys): 4th place (1961–62, 1967–68, 1974–75); 3rd place (1968–69); 2nd place (1962–63, 1963–64)
- Swimming & Diving (boys): 4th place (1952–53)
- Tennis (boys): 3rd place (1960–61)
- Wrestling: 2nd place (1960–61)
- Fencing: 1st place – State Champion Team (1969–70)

== Notable alumni ==
- Diane Davis (married name Diane Francis) (class of 1964) Canadian columnist, corporate director, Editor at Large National Post, columnist Kyiv Post, author of 10 books, Atlantic Council Senior Fellow, Eurasia Center, corporate director of publicly listed companies, including Zoomer Media in Toronto and recipient of writing awards and honorary doctorates.
- Robert Horvitz (class of 1964) was the co-recipient of the 2002 Nobel Prize in Physiology or Medicine for discoveries concerning genetic regulation of organ development and programmed cell death.
- Martin Chalfie (class of 1965) was the co-recipient of the 2008 Nobel Prize in Chemistry for the discovery and development of the green fluorescent protein, GFP.
- William Campbell (class of 1949) U.S. Air Force lieutenant general.
- David Kaplan (class of 1978) Member of the Chicagoland Sports Hall of Fame; ESPN 1000 radio sportscaster and host of Sports Talk Live on Comcast SportsNet Chicago.
- William Nack (class of 1959) author of best seller Secretariat, consultant to and bit part in the movie, and Ruffian, also made into a movie. Political/government reporter for Long Island Newsday and later senior editor for Sports Illustrated.
- Jill Wine-Banks (class of 1961?) television news legal commentator, Watergate prosecutor, first woman executive director of the American Bar Association. First woman general counsel of the U.S. Army.
- Bruce Wolf (class of 1971) radio personality in the Chicago market for decades.
