= Marc Selz =

American film director and producer

Marc Selz (born c. 1970) is an American film director and producer. He specializes in horror/ slasher films.

== Biography ==
Selz is a 1988 graduate of Niles North High School in Skokie, Illinois and studied film at Columbia College Chicago. He started shooting super 8 short Six Million Dollar Man movies when he was eight years old. He completed his first feature horror film, Short Cut Road in 2003 which was distributed by horror movie outlet Sub Rosa Studios on DVD in 2003, quickly followed by The Rockville Slayer in 2004, which was distributed by Freestyle Home Entertainment and Universal UMVD. The Rockville Slayer had horror genre actors Joe Estevez, Linnea Quigley, and Robert Z'Dar star in the film.

In 2006, he was set to shoot his third feature, Satanic Panic, but had to push back production until 2007 due to time constraints. Because of the shooting delay, some parts had to be recast, including roles originally set to star veteran B-movie actresses Felissa Rose and Brinke Stevens. The final cast consists of mostly Chicago-based actors. The film is loosely based on the "satanic cult" killings that occurred during the 1980s and 1990s. Satanic Panic began filming in the summer of 2007 with most principal photography completed in September. The remaining scenes were shot in June and July 2008. Marc has jokingly referred to Satanic as "the Star Wars of low budget horror movies" because of the time it took to complete. Marc stated, "Karl (co-writer Karl Sundstrom) and I started writing Satanic in September/October of 2005. Three years in the making because Satanic finished production in the fall of 2008." Satanic Panic was initially planned as a straight-to-DVD project, but there was word of a potential limited theatrical release due to industry buzz about the film. The film was screened on November 28, 2008, in Wheeling, IL for friends, family and some press. In late 2008 a mask distribution deal of the creature "Toby" from the film Satanic Panic was made between Marc Selz Productions, LLC and Chicago's Zagone Studios. The Satanic Panic mask will be mass-produced and carried in Halloween USA outlet stores for Halloween 2009. A world distribution deal was signed for Satanic Panic with Marc Selz Productions, LLC and Celebrity Video Distribution out of Los Angeles California in July 2009 for a DVD and Blu-ray release date of October 13, 2009.

Marc Selz Productions signed a two-year cable deal with NBC Universal's Chiller Channel to air The Rockville Slayer starting in October 2009. In April 2011 Marc Selz Productions, LLC signed a two-year deal with Netflix Inc. to digitally stream The Rockville Slayer. In July 2012, Selz forms the new production company Psycho Logical Pictures, LLC. www.facebook.com/psychologicalpictures. In December 2014, Selz finished the horror/thriller feature screenplay "Imposter" and is currently working to get the film into production.

== Filmography ==
- Imposter (2016)
- Satanic Panic (2008)
- The Rockville Slayer (2004) (a.k.a. Unaware and Hidden Fear)
- Short Cut Road (2003)
