= Arnie Bernstein =

American writer of historical nonfiction

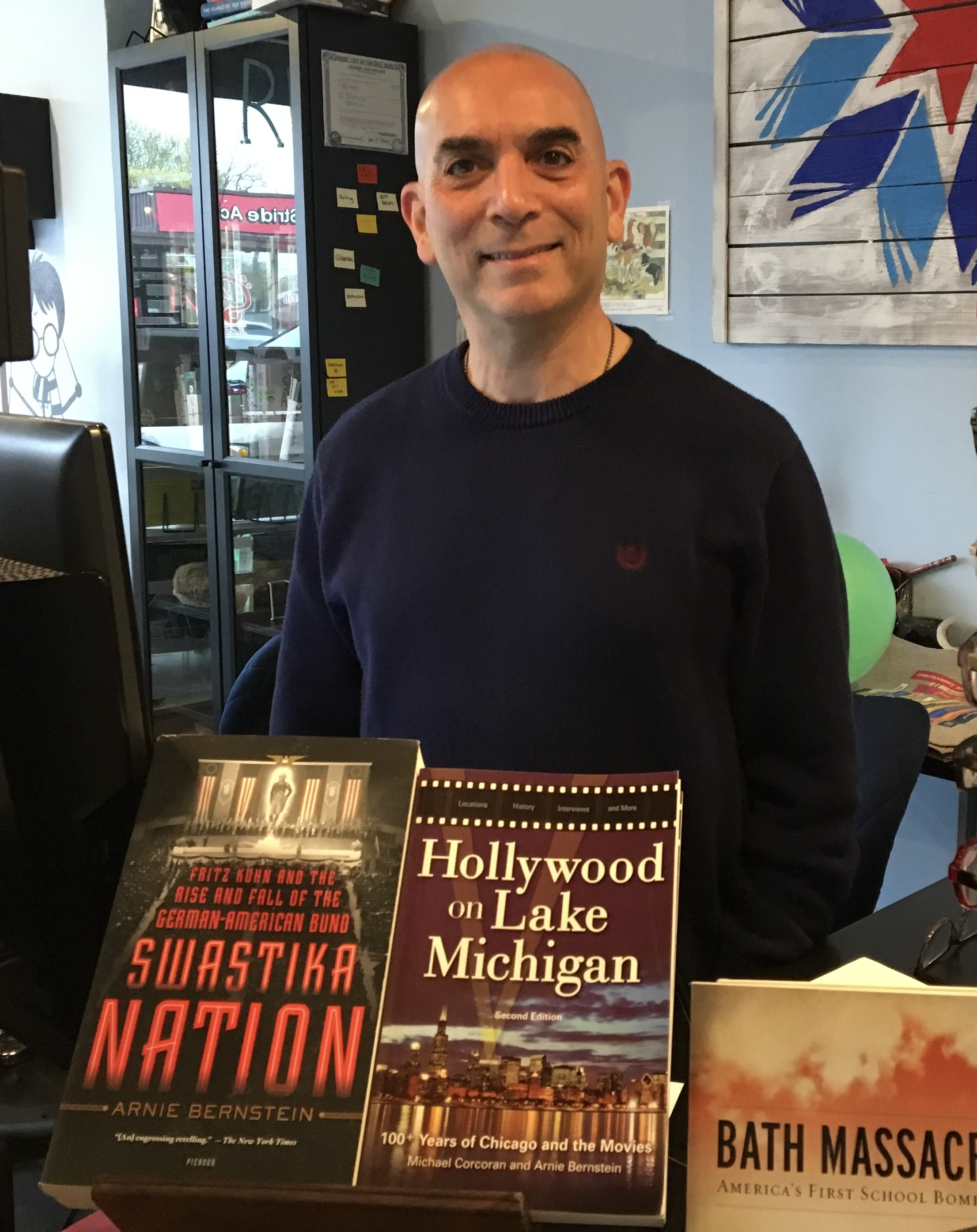
- Arnie with a display of his books in 2019.
- Born: 1960 (age 65–66); Harvey, Illinois, U.S.
- Education: Niles West High School Southern Illinois University (BA); Columbia College Chicago (MA)
- Occupation: Writer
- Writing career
- Language: English

Arnie Bernstein (born 1960) is an American writer of historical nonfiction. His works include Bath Massacre: America’s First School Bombing and Swastika Nation: Fritz Kuhn and the Rise and Fall of the German-American Bund.

== Biography ==
Bernstein is a native of Chicago. He graduated from Niles West High School and attended Southern Illinois University where he majored in film studies and theater. He received a master's degree from Columbia College Chicago.

His writings have covered topics such as the Bath School bombing and the German-American Bund as well as its leader, Fritz Kuhn. His writing has been featured in Tablet magazine. He has also been published in the Chicago Tribune.

Bernstein has discussed his book Bath Massacre on C-SPAN Book TV as a talking head and on the Australian Radio National show RN Breakfast. He discussed his book Swastika Nation in an interview with the Polish journal Historia Do Rzeczy, on MSNBC on the AM Joy Show. He also spoke about the book on the podcast Your Weekly Constitutional with Stewart Harris. In addition has been featured on PBS "American Experience,"

Swastika Nation was reviewed in The New York Times and the Kirkus Reviews. He detailed the adversarial relationship between Fritz Kuhn and iconic American columnist Walter Winchell; this topic and his views were later published in the Times Book Review.

== Awards and honors ==
- 2000 American Regional History Book Award for Hollywood on Lake Michigan: 100 Years of Chicago and the Movies, First Place
- 2005 Illinois State Library Authors Fair
- 2010 Michigan Notable Book Honors for Bath Massacre: America's First School Bombing
- He earned the Warner Brothers Studios Comedy Writing Workshop scholarship
- He received the Puffin Foundation grant
- Lit 50: Who Really Books Chicago 2019. Named as one of the top 50 people in the Chicago book world, along with Alta Price, for advocacy work in Chicago on behalf of the Authors Guild

== Works ==
- Bernstein, Arnie (2003). The Hoofs and Guns of the Storm: Chicago's Civil War Connections. Chicago: Lake Claremont Press. ISBN 9781893121065. OCLC 53149544.
- Bernstein, Arnie, ed. (2000). The Movies are: Carl Sandburg's Film Reviews and Essays, 1920-1928. Chicago: Lake Claremont Press. ISBN 9781893121058. OCLC 45184671.
- Bernstein, Arnie (1998). Hollywood on Lake Michigan: 100 Years of Chicago and the Movies. Chicago: Lake Claremont Press. ISBN 9780964242623. OCLC 40796305.
- Bernstein, Arnie (2009). Bath Massacre: America's First School Bombing. Ann Arbor: The University of Michigan Press. ISBN 978-0472024704. OCLC 587638431.
- Bernstein, Arnie (2013). Swastika Nation: Fritz Kuhn and the Rise and Fall of the German-American Bund. New York: St. Martin's Press. ISBN 978-1250006714. OCLC 827256873.
