= Niles West High School =

Public high school in Illinois, United States

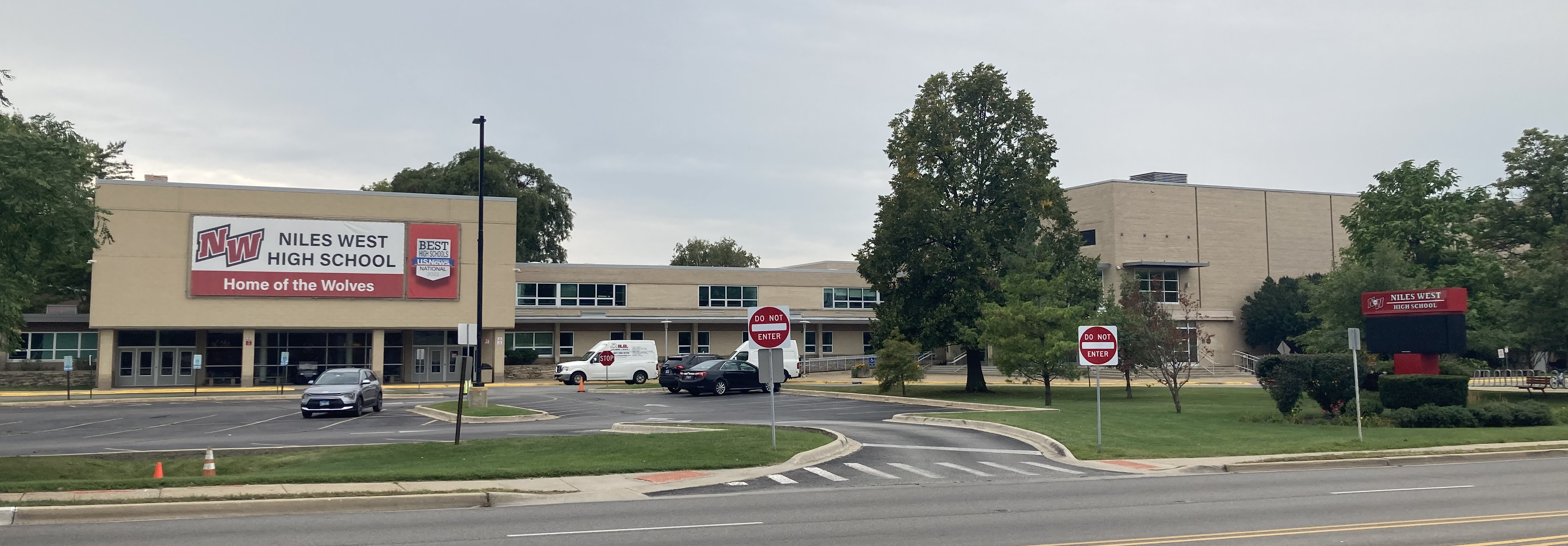

Location
- 5701 Oakton St; Skokie, Illinois 60077; United States; 42.0244°N 87.7723°W

Information
- School type: public, comprehensive secondary
- Opened: 1958
- School district: Niles Township High School District 219
- NCES District ID: 1728530
- Superintendent: Thomas Moore
- NCES School ID: 172853002988
- Principal: Steve Parnther
- Teaching staff: 193.00(FTE)
- Grades: 9-12
- Gender: coed
- Enrollment: 2,615 (2023–2024)
- Student to teacher ratio: 13.55
- Campus type: City: small
- Colors: red white
- Athletics conference: Central Suburban League
- Team name: Wolves
- Newspaper: Niles West News
- Yearbook: Spectrum
- Website: https://west.niles219.org/

Niles West High School (NWHS), officially Niles Township High School West, is a public four-year high school located in Skokie, Illinois, a north suburb of Chicago, Illinois in the United States. Niles West is part of Niles Township High School District 219, which also includes Niles North High School. The feeder middle-schools for Niles West are Lincoln Junior High School, Fairview South Elementary School, Lincoln Hall Middle School, Culver Middle School, and Park View Elementary School. Niles West High School also matriculates many students from MCC Academy in Morton Grove, Illinois.

== History ==
Following rapid population growth in Skokie and surrounding communities after World War II, enrollment at Niles Township High School increased substantially, leading District 219 to plan a second high school. In August 1954, a $300,000 bond referendum was approved for the purchase of 56 acres of land near Oakton Street and Major Avenue for the new campus.

Groundbreaking ceremonies for the second high school took place on May 15, 1956. Construction continued over the following two years, and Niles Township High School West opened in September 1958.

Initially, the new campus and the original Niles Township High School operated as the West and East divisions of a single high school. The West Division (Niles West) served freshmen and sophomores, while the East Division (Niles East) served juniors and seniors. Starting with the 1961-62 school year, Niles West and Niles East began operating as separate four-year high schools.

Continued population growth in Niles Township led District 219 to open Niles North High School in 1964. Niles West remained one of the three district high schools until declining enrollment forced the closure of Niles East in 1980, after which students from Niles East were absorbed into Niles West and Niles North.

In 1996, the Niles Township Federation of Teachers went on a strike for two weeks over negotiations with administrators. During that time numerous students staged a walkout and pledged their allegiance to Niles West. Strikes have also happened in 1967,1973,1976,1979, and 1985 with similar results.

For much of its history, Niles West's athletic teams were known as the Indians. The District 219 Board of Education voted to retire the nickname in October 2000, and the Wolves name was adopted in April 2001.

== Academics ==
In 2007, Niles West had an average composite ACT score of 22.3, and graduated 93.2% of its senior class. The average class size was 19.2. In 2012, Newsweek ranked Niles West on its list of the Top 1000 Public Schools in the nation.

As of 2011, many 8th or 7th graders have been attending Niles West High School as part as an off-level program.

== Athletics ==
Niles West competes in the Central Suburban League and Illinois High School Association (IHSA). Teams are stylized as the Wolves.

Until the end of the 2000–2001 school year, the sports teams were known as Niles West Indians, a name which was changed to the Wolves so as not to offend Native Americans.

Niles West sponsors interscholastic athletic teams for boys and girls in basketball, cheerleading, cross country, golf, gymnastics, soccer, water polo, swimming & diving, tennis, track & field, and volleyball. Boys may also compete in baseball and football. Girls can also compete on the wrestling team and may compete in softball. While not sponsored by the IHSA, the school also sponsors a poms team for girls.

The baseball team has won two IHSA state championships (1971–72 and 1974–75). The girls basketball team won the IHSA state championship in 1978-79.

Niles West also won the IHSA state championship for boys gymnastics in 2016.

== Notable alumni ==
- Steven N. Berk, associate judge on the Superior Court of the District of Columbia; nominated by Barack Obama
- Arnie Bernstein, nonfiction writer
- Bart Conner, International Gymnastics Hall of Fame inductee and Congressional Gold Medal recipient
- Jeffrey Erickson, bank robber
- Merrick Garland, 86th Attorney General of the United States (2021-2025)
- Kahmora Hall, drag queen and RuPaul's Drag Race contestant
- Jim Hart (American football), NFL quarterback (1966–1984), most notably for the St. Louis Cardinals, selected to four Pro Bowls
- Paul Igasaki, former chief judge of U.S. Department of Labor's Administrative Review Board
- Jerry Kang, UCLA law professor and university administrator, current presidential nominee for the National Council on the Humanities, advisory board for the National Endowment for the Humanities,
- George Kontos, former San Francisco Giants pitcher and sports commentator for NBC Bay Area
- George Kotsiopoulos, television host, author, and former magazine editor
- John S. Koudounis, CEO of Calamos Investments
- Gary Kremen, founder of Match.com
- Jewell Loyd, a professional basketball player currently playing for the Las Vegas Aces of the WNBA (league champion (with Seattle Storm, 2018, 2020), Gold Medal, Tokyo 2020 Olympics, Paris 2024 Olympics; her number 32 retired by Niles West High School
- Rashard Mendenhall, former football player, Huffington Post contributor, and writer for HBO's Ballers
- George Papadopoulos, policy adviser
- David T. Rubin, physician-scientist, educator, ethicist; chair of the International Organization for the Study of Inflammatory Bowel Disease
- Atour Sargon, Assyrian American activist and politician
- Maya Schenwar, editor-in-chief of Truthout and a writer focused on prison-related topics
- Rick Singer, mastermind of 2019 college admissions bribery scandal
- Todd Sucherman, Styx drummer
- Larsa Pippen, American reality television personality, socialite, and businesswoman
- Jeanette Sliwinski, former model convicted of reckless homicide
- Azhar Usman, standup comedian, screenwriter, Marvel actor, television & film producer
