= Steven N. Berk =

American judge

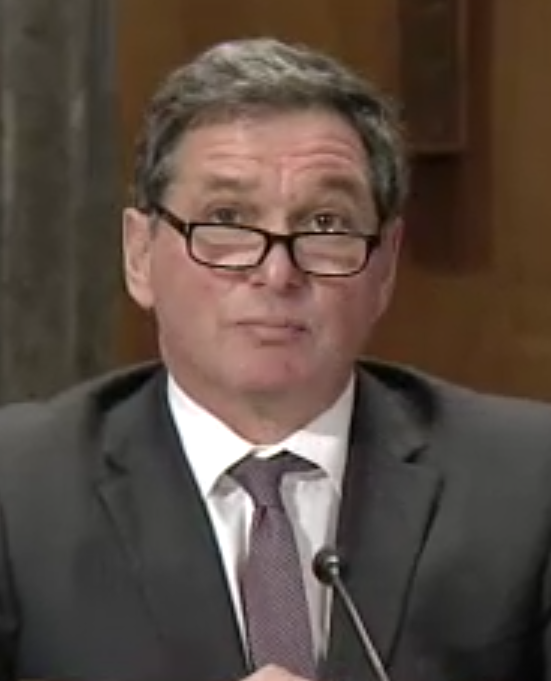

Associate Judge on the Superior Court of the District of Columbia
- In office July 29, 2016 – November 1, 2021
- President: Barack Obama
- Preceded by: Harold L. Cushenberry, Jr.
- Succeeded by: Laura Crane

Personal details
- Born: Steven Nathan Berk; July 2, 1959 (age 67) Chicago, Illinois, U.S.
- Spouse: Jennifer C. Hauge
- Children: 2
- Education: Washington University (AB); London School of Economics (MSc); Boston College (JD)
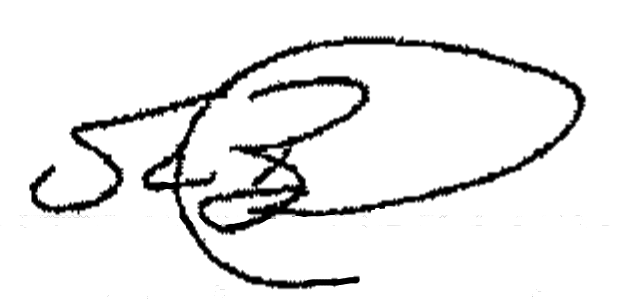
- Signature

Steven Nathan Berk (born July 2, 1959) is an American lawyer and former judge. He served as an Associate Judge on the Superior Court of the District of Columbia from 2016 to 2021.

== Education and career ==
He was born in Chicago and graduated from Niles West High School in 1977. Berk earned his Bachelor of Arts from Washington University in St. Louis in 1981, Master of Science from the London School of Economics in 1982, and J.D. from Boston College Law School in 1985. From 1983 to 2009 he worked in private practice in Chicago, Illinois and Washington, DC. From 1989 to 1992 he was a staff attorney for the United States Securities and Exchange Commission.

From 1990 to 1995, Berk worked in the U.S. Attorney's Office in the District of Columbia as Assistant United States Attorney.

From 2000 to 2003, he left practicing law to found a social networking site, iHappen. He then returned to practicing law between 2009 and 2016 when he served of counsel to two law firms and as the principal of Berk Law PLLC.

=== D.C. Superior Court ===
President Barack Obama nominated Berk on November 30, 2015, to a 15-year term as an associate judge on the Superior Court of the District of Columbia to the seat vacated by Harold L. Cushenberry Jr. On March 2, 2016, the Senate Committee on Homeland Security and Governmental Affairs held a hearing on his nomination. On April 25, 2016, the Committee reported his nomination favorably to the senate floor. The Senate confirmed his nomination on June 23, 2016, by voice vote. He was sworn in on July 29, 2016. After the District of Columbia Commission on Judicial Disabilities and Tenure received formal and informal complaints regarding Berk, he agreed to be placed on administrative leave on June 8, 2021, while the Commission conducted an investigation. The Commission subsequently determined that Berk should be involuntarily retired on November 1, 2021, due to violations of Rule 2.5, Canon 2 of the Code of Judicial Conduct for the District of Columbia and health reasons.

== Personal life ==
Steven Berk is married to Jennifer Chandler Hauge, a nonprofit executive.
