= William J. Campbell (general) =

United States Air Force general

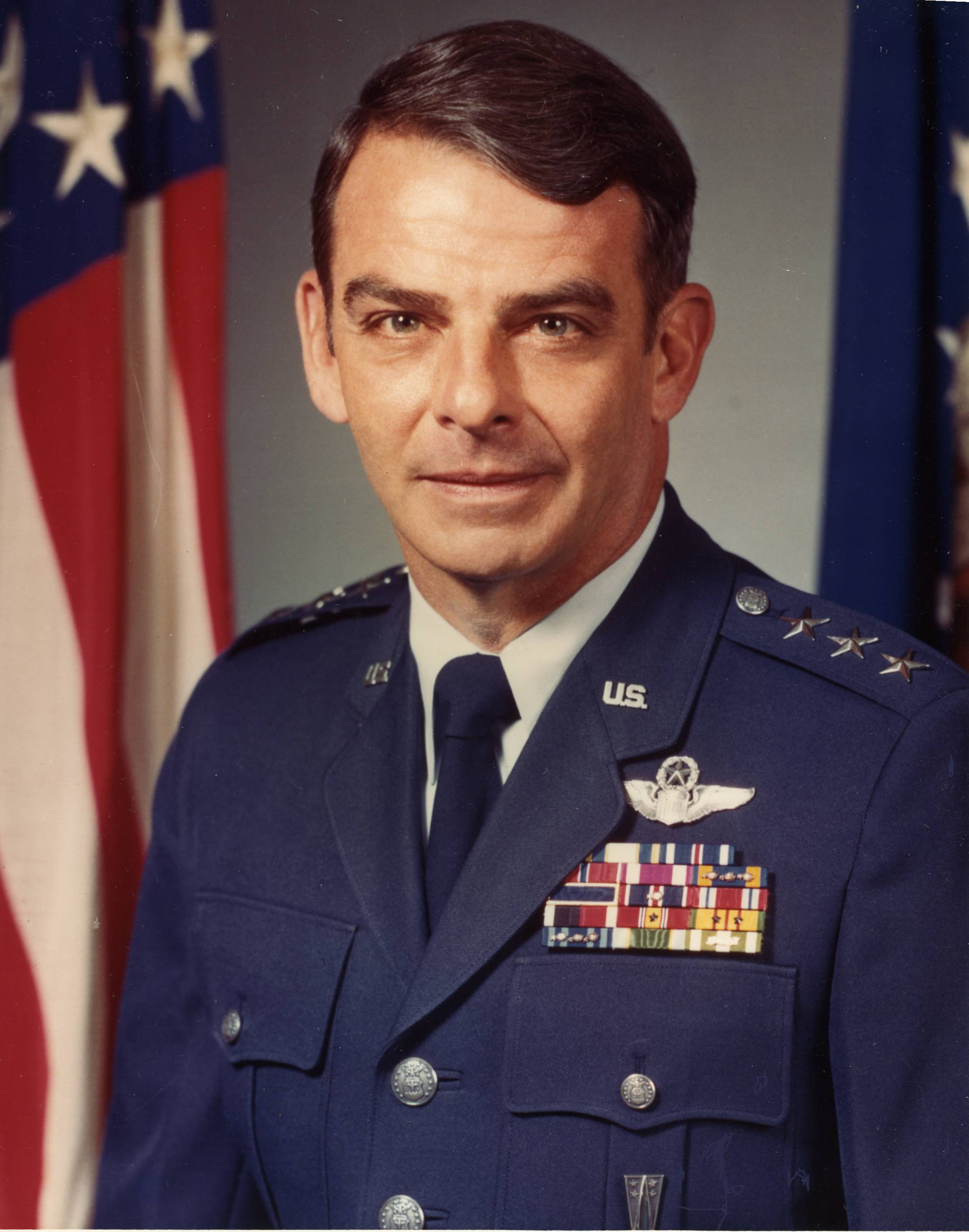
- Born: May 11, 1931; Chicago, Illinois, U.S.
- Died: February 2, 2017 (aged 85); Sarasota, Florida, U.S.
- Military career
- Allegiance: United States
- Branch: United States Air Force
- Service years: 1953–1985
- Rank: Lieutenant General
- Commands: Vice Commander-in-Chief, Strategic Air Command

William John Campbell (May 11, 1931 – February 2, 2017) was an American Air Force lieutenant general whose last assignment was vice commander in chief, Strategic Air Command, headquartered at Offutt Air Force Base, Nebraska. He assumed this position August 31, 1984 and served until July 26, 1985.

== Biography ==
Campbell was born in Chicago in 1931 and graduated from Niles Township High School, Skokie, Illinois, in 1949. He graduated from the U.S. Military Academy, West Point, New York, in 1953 with a Bachelor of Science degree in military science and a commission as a second lieutenant in the Air Force. Campbell received a Master of Science degree in systems management from the University of Southern California in 1968, and graduated from the Industrial College of the Armed Forces at Fort Lesley J. McNair, Washington, D.C., in 1972.

He completed pilot training at Williams Air Force Base, Arizona, in August 1954. After four months of F-86 combat crew training at Nellis Air Force Base, Nevada, he transferred to the 36th Fighter-Day Wing, Bitburg Air Base, Germany, for duty as a fighter pilot, flying F-86s and F-100s. He was assigned in October 1958 to McConnell Air Force Base, Kan., for B-47 training. In July 1959 Campbell joined the 301st Bombardment Wing at Lockbourne (now Rickenbacker) Air Force Base, Ohio, as a B-47 aircraft commander.

From August 1962 to December 1963, he attended the Experimental Test Pilot and Aerospace Research Pilot courses at the U.S. Air Force Aerospace Research Pilot School, Edwards Air Force Base, Calif. Upon graduation Campbell spent three months as a member of the first crew selected to fly a seven-day simulated lunar landing mission in the Martin Company's Apollo simulator, in Baltimore. In May 1964 he was assigned to the Air Force Missile Development Center, Holloman Air Force Base, N.M., where, as chief of the Interceptor Test Division, he was responsible f or testing F-101s, F-106s and associated weapons.

In July 1965 Campbell transferred to the 9th Strategic Reconnaissance Wing, Beale Air Force Base, California, where he became one of the first aircraft commanders operationally qualified in SR-71s. He returned to Edwards Air Force Base in June 1969 and served at the Air Force Flight Test Center as operations officer of the SR-71 and YF-12A Joint Test Force until May 1970, when he became test force director. Campbell has logged more than 750 hours in these Mach 3-plus aircraft.

Campbell was named commandant of the U.S. Air Force Aerospace Research Pilot School in January 1971. The school trains experimental test pilots and potential astronauts for future space programs. He attended the Industrial College of the Armed Forces from August 1971 to June 1972. After graduation Campbell had F-4 training at MacDill Air Force Base, Florida. He then moved to Ubon Royal Thai Air Force Base, Thailand, as deputy commander for operations, 8th Tactical Fighter Wing.

Returning from Southeast Asia in November 1973, he was assigned to the Aeronautical Systems Division at Wright-Patterson Air Force Base, Ohio, as director of development, test and evaluation, Office of the Deputy for B-1 Aircraft. In this capacity he was responsible for planning the extensive test program for SAC's new bomber.

From July 1974 until October 1975, Campbell commanded the 6th Strategic Wing, Eielson Air Force Base, Alaska. He was then assigned to SAC headquarters as assistant deputy chief of staff, plans, for special programs. From September 1977 to July 1980, he served initially as assistant deputy chief of staff, plans and later as deputy chief of staff for plans. He then transferred to Headquarters U.S. Air Force, Washington, D.C., as director of programs in the Office of the Deputy Chief of Staff, Programs and Evaluation. In October 1982 he became commander of 8th Air Force, Barksdale Air Force Base, La. He assumed the position of Vice Commander in Chief, Strategic Air Command in September 1984.

He is a command pilot with more than 6,000 military and civil flying hours in a variety of aircraft that include B-47s, B-57s, EC-135s, KC-135s, RC-135s, SR-71s, F-86s, F-100s, F-101s, F-104s, F-106s, F-4s, YF-12A's, T-33s, T-38s and T-39s. His military decorations and awards include the Distinguished Service Medal, Distinguished Flying Cross, Bronze Star Medal, Meritorious Service Medal, Air Medal with three oak leaf clusters, Presidential Unit Citation Emblem and Air Force Outstanding Unit Award Ribbon with five oak leaf clusters.

He was promoted to lieutenant general October 15, 1982, with same date of rank. He retired on July 1, 1985.

Campbell moved to Sarasota, Florida after retirement.
