= Mizuho Americas =

American arm of the Mizuho Financial Group

- Genre: Investment Bank
- Founded: July 2016; 9 years ago
- Headquarters: 1271 Avenue of the Americas; New York City, United States
- Parent: Mizuho Financial Group
- Website: mizuhoamericas.com

Mizuho Americas was established on July 1, 2016 as a US bank holding company, as the American corporate and investment banking arm of the Tokyo-based Mizuho Financial Group.

== Operations ==
Mizuho Americas is a holding firm for a variety of financing, securities, treasury services, and aggregating segments in corporate and investment banking. Departments include loan markets, corporate and investment banking, equity, high yield sales & trading, fixed income sales and trading, and leveraged capital markets, which oversees the origination of investment grade and non-investment grade debt products. As of December 31, 2022, its total assets were approximately $2 trillion and total revenues were 605 billion yen.

Mizuho Financial Group’s U.S. operations also include Mizuho Bank USA; Mizuho Securities USA LLC, a U.S. broker dealer engaged in securities; and Mizuho Trust & Banking Co. (USA).

== Divisions ==
Mizuho Securities USA LLC (”MSUSA”) operates as an institutional brokerage firm, focusing focuses on equity, futures clearing, execution, and fixed income products, as well as specializes in raising capital through mergers and acquisition, debt, equity underwriting, and advisory services. It is an SEC-registered Broker-Dealer and a Primary Dealer of US Treasuries designated by the Federal Reserve Bank of New York. MSUSA is also registered with the CFTC as a futures commission merchant (FCM). MSUSA’s Equity Division provides equity research, capital markets access, and extensive equity and equity-linked distribution and execution capabilities for the equity markets in Asia and the Americas. MSUSA also has a Corporate Access desk that arranges numerous non-deal road shows. In 2010 MSUSA participated as Global Joint Coordinator on Dai-Ichi Life IPO, which was the largest IPO in Japan and 2nd largest globally for the year, and in the $6 billion Mizuho Financial Group global offering.

In September 2023, Mizuho Americas won a lead role as underwriter for British multinational semiconductor and software design company Arm Holdings initial public offering (IPO). The IPO was the biggest of 2023, and the largest offering in the technology field since Alibaba Group in 2014.

MSUSA’s Fixed Income Division client relationship list includes central banks, banks, municipalities, hedge funds, asset managers and insurance corporations. MSUSA’s fixed income products include: US Treasuries, corporate bonds, Debt Capital Markets, US Agency Securities, Securities Financing, Strategic Credit Group, mortgage- and asset-backed securities, Japanese Government Bonds, Yen Fixed Income, Emerging Markets MSUSA’s Futures Division provides futures clearing and execution services across a spectrum of institutional clients. MSUSA provides market coverage through Electronic Execution Services, Clearing Services and Voice Execution Services.

Mizuho Bank USA provides banking and financial services, largely focusing on deposits, loans, real estate finance, asset securitization, and project financing services. Mizuho Trust & Banking Co. (USA) provides custody, master custody, and securities lending services. The Company offers a range of custody services primarily for the U.S. securities investment, including securities settlement and safekeeping, collection and remittance of dividend income, corporate actions, cash management, proxy notification and voting, and reporting.

== People ==
Shuji Matsuura is the company’s chairman and CEO and the president and CEO of Mizuho Securities USA and Head of CIB is Jerry Rizzieri. Michal Katz is the head of investment and corporate banking, Thomas Hartnett is the head of fixed-income sales and trading, and Darlene Pasquill is the head of the equity division.

== Acquisitions ==
In February 2015, it agreed to buy Royal Bank of Scotland’s (RBS) U.S. and Canadian $36.5 billion corporate loan portfolio, increasing the size of its U.S. corporate loan book by 50 percent, and in April 2015 hired approximately 200 RBS employees across fixed income, debt capital markets, debt syndicate, leveraged finance, loans, and derivatives. In 2021, Mizuho acquired Dallas-based private equity placement agent Capstone Partners. In January 2023, Mizuho acquired a significant portion of Credit Suisse’s agency securitized-products trading business. In 2023, Mizuho announced a definitive agreement for Mizuho to acquire Greenhill in an all-cash transaction at $15 per share, reflecting an enterprise value of approximately $550 million, including assumed debt.

== Culture ==
In 2020, Mizuho Americas was active bookrunner on Mizuho Financial Group’s $2.5 billion diversity and inclusion bond issue, reportedly a first for a Japanese bank. Mizuho Americas is title sponsor of the Mizuho Americas Open, the first LPGA Tour tournament at Liberty National Golf Course in Jersey City, NJ. The inaugural tournament took place from May 29-June 4, 2023, with Michelle Wie West as Tournament Host. The event has a purse of $3 million, a 120-player field, and an AJGA Invitational component for 24 junior golfers. In 2023, Mizuho started a $500,000 partnership with nonprofit Girls Inc.
