= Oakton College =

Community college in Illinois, US

Coordinates: 42.063444°N 87.880201°W

- Type: Public community college
- Established: 1969; 57 years ago
- Endowment: $9.4 million (2025)
- President: Joianne L. Smith
- Students: 7,433 (spring 2022)
- Location: Des Plaines and Skokie, Illinois, United States
- Website: www.oakton.edu

Oakton College is a public community college with campuses in Des Plaines and Skokie, Illinois. It was established in 1969 in Morton Grove, Illinois and moved to its current locations in 1980.

== History ==
Oakton College opened in 1969 as Oakton Community College in former industrial buildings at Oakton and Nagle in Morton Grove. This original campus closed when the Des Plaines and Skokie campuses opened in 1980. The Skokie campus originally operated out of the former Niles East High School. The college demolished the school buildings in 1993 to make way for the current Skokie campus building, named the Ray Hartstein Campus after the College's founding chairman. On January 17, 2023, Oakton Community College was renamed Oakton College, accompanied by a new logo and branding.

=== Des Plaines campus ===
Oakton's main campus in Des Plaines is located on 147 acres (59.5 ha) of woodlands and prairie, between Golf Road to the south and Central Road to the north, bordered on the west by the Des Plaines River. The main campus building, a red-brick structure, was dedicated in 1980. With 435,000 square feet (40,400 m^{2}) of space, it houses 65 classrooms and 46 educational laboratories, as well as student services, administrative and faculty offices. Special facilities include 19 computer classrooms; Automotive Technology Lab, Performing Arts Center; Early Childhood Center; the Business Institute; the William A. Koehnline Museum of Art (/ˈkɛnlaɪn/); Ceramics Studio; and a teleconferencing center, cannabis studies lab, gym, fitness center, library, cafe, and bookstore.

Oakton College's Koehnline Museum of Art was named for the College's founding president William A. Koehnline. The museum has a large permanent collection that includes works by Margaret Burroughs, Otto Neumann, Georg Stahl, and about 40 film posters from African-American films. Nathan Harpaz is the manager and curator of the Koehnline Museum.

Construction on a new addition to the northeast side of the campus began in April 2012, with a projected open date in time for the 2014 summer semester. However, due to weather and issues with the concrete slab used for the ground settlement, the building was not available for use until the spring semester of 2015. The $39 million addition, which stands three stories tall and spans 93,000 square feet, is the largest structural change to the campus since its opening in 1980. The new building, which houses health and sciences classes, is part of a $68.5 million five year Facilities Master Plan which went into effect in December 2010. The community college will seek certification with the Leadership in Energy and Environmental Design due to its features, which include self shading windows which will provide natural lighting to 75 percent of the classrooms during the day. In honor of President Margaret Burke Lee and her planned retirement in June 2015 after 30 years of service, the building has been named the Margaret Burke Lee Science and Health Careers Center.

=== Skokie campus ===
The Skokie campus, known officially as the Ray Hartstein Campus, is located on a 21-acre (8.5 ha) site along North Lincoln Avenue, near downtown Skokie. The current building was dedicated in 1995 and is set on a spacious lawn with mature trees as well as new plantings. The building provides almost 165,000 square feet (15,300 m^{2}) of space for 31 classrooms, 12 laboratories and other educational and administrative offices. Special facilities include a teleconferencing and distance learning center; a Child Care Center; and offices for student activities, the Emeritus Program, Alliance for Lifelong Learning (ALL) and English as a Second Language (ESL)/Literacy.

== Academics ==
The college offers both credit and non-credit classes. Some credit classes include courses in Accounting, Computer Science, Humanities, Mathematics, etc. Oakton College is accredited by The Higher Learning Commission and the North Central Association.

In 2014, Oakton entered into a dual enrollment agreement with Shimer College, a Great Books Program college in Chicago, under which Oakton students could attend Shimer classes for credit at Oakton. It was the first extension of Shimer's dual enrollment system beyond the City Colleges of Chicago.

== Student life ==
Oakton College is a member of National Junior College Athletic Association (NJCAA), and offers men's teams in baseball, basketball, cross country, golf, soccer, tennis, and track and field; and women's teams in basketball, cross country, golf, soccer, softball, tennis, track and field, and volleyball. Students may also participate in a variety of intramural sports on campus.

There are over 50 clubs on campus. The community college also has a Student Government Association, Student Judicial Board, the student newspaper OCCurrence, and other student led programs.

== Area served ==
Cook County Suburban Community College District 535 serves 450,000 residents in northeast Cook County, Illinois. The school serves Chicago's North Shore suburbs of Des Plaines, Evanston, Glencoe, Glenview, Golf, Kenilworth, Lincolnwood, Morton Grove, Niles, Northbrook, Northfield, Park Ridge, Rosemont, Skokie, Wilmette, and Winnetka.
