= Calamos Investments =

American investment firm

- Type: Private
- Traded as: Nasdaq: CLMS
- Founded: 1977; 49 years ago
- Headquarters: Naperville, Illinois, United States
- Products: Equity, fixed income, and alternative investments
- AUM: Over $40 billion
- Number of employees: 300+
- Website: www.calamos.com

Calamos Investments is a diversified global investment firm offering an array of investment strategies including active growth equity, risk managed, convertible, sustainable equity, fixed income and alternatives. The firm offers strategies through separately managed portfolios, mutual funds, closed-end funds, private funds, an exchange traded fund and UCITS funds. Clients include major corporations, pension funds, endowments, foundations and individuals, as well as the financial advisors and consultants who serve them. Headquartered in the Chicago metropolitan area, the firm also has offices in New York, San Francisco, Milwaukee and the Miami area.

== History ==
Calamos began as a boutique investment manager in the 1970s, developing strategies designed to maximize the potential of convertible securities to generate excess returns and manage risk. Founder John Calamos notes that the modern convertible bond market developed side-by-side with the options market, and together they presented an opportunity to control risk more precisely than was historically possible. In 1990, the firm launched its Market Neutral Income Fund, billed as one of the first liquid alternative investment funds and providing access to hedge fund strategies for individual investors.

Calamos employs more than 300 individuals in Naperville, Illinois, as well as sales and client service professionals--and investment advisors affiliated with its wealth management unit, Calamos Wealth Management--throughout the United States. In 2016, as part of its succession planning, the firm hired John S. Koudounis as president and chief executive officer, with founder John Calamos serving as chairman and chief investment officer. Subsequent to Koudounis joining, the firm made a series of strategic asset manager acquisitions that broadened its product offerings to include global long-short equity, small-cap stocks and ESG investments.
