= Lincolnwood School District 74 =

School district in Illinois, United States

Address
- 6950 North East Prairie Road Lincolnwood, Illinois, 60712; United States

District information
- Type: Public
- Grades: PK–8
- Schools: 3
- NCES District ID: 1723100

Students and staff
- Students: 1,196 (2025–2026)
- Teachers: 113.00 (on an FTE basis) (2025–2026)
- Staff: 102.00 (on an FTE basis) (2025–2026)
- Student–teacher ratio: 10.58 (2025–2026)

Other information
- Website: www.sd74.org

Lincolnwood School District 74 is a public school district headquartered Lincolnwood, Illinois.

== History ==
It was created in 1938, with Lincoln Hall as the only school at the time.

In January 2012, several Lincolnwood residents became concerned with the finances in School District 74. Through a Freedom of Information Act (FOIA) request, the residents discovered the School Board President, other School Board Members, and the Superintendent Mark Klaisner had spent tens of thousands of dollars on trips, cellphone service, gasoline for personal use. The local CBS affiliate did a story on the overspending. In an interview in the Skokie Patch, Superintendent Dr. Mark A. Klaisner admitted to poor internal controls and being "completely unaware" of details of the car provided by taxpayers. The School Board extended the contract of Superintendent Dr. Mark A. Klaisner. On April 9, 2012, School Board President Amy Frankel resigned as first reported in the Skokie Patch. On April 17, retired superintendent Ken Cull (formerly Itasca District 10) was elected interim superintendent through June 2012.

Joseph Bailey was scheduled to retire as superintendent in June 2017, and in 2016 the district's board selected Kimberly "Kim" Nasshan as his replacement.

During the COVID-19 pandemic in Illinois, the district had 33 persons collectively complete its reopening plan, which allowed both in-person and remote options. The classroom desks, socially distanced when possible, were oriented the same.

== Governance ==
Potential board members must be citizens of the United States, have lived in the district for at least one year; this means effectively all board members are residents of the state of Illinois.

== Schools ==
- Lincoln Hall - Grades 6-8 (middle school)
- Rutledge Hall - Grades 3-5
- Todd Hall - Preschool-Grade 2
