= Lincolnwood, Illinois =

- Village
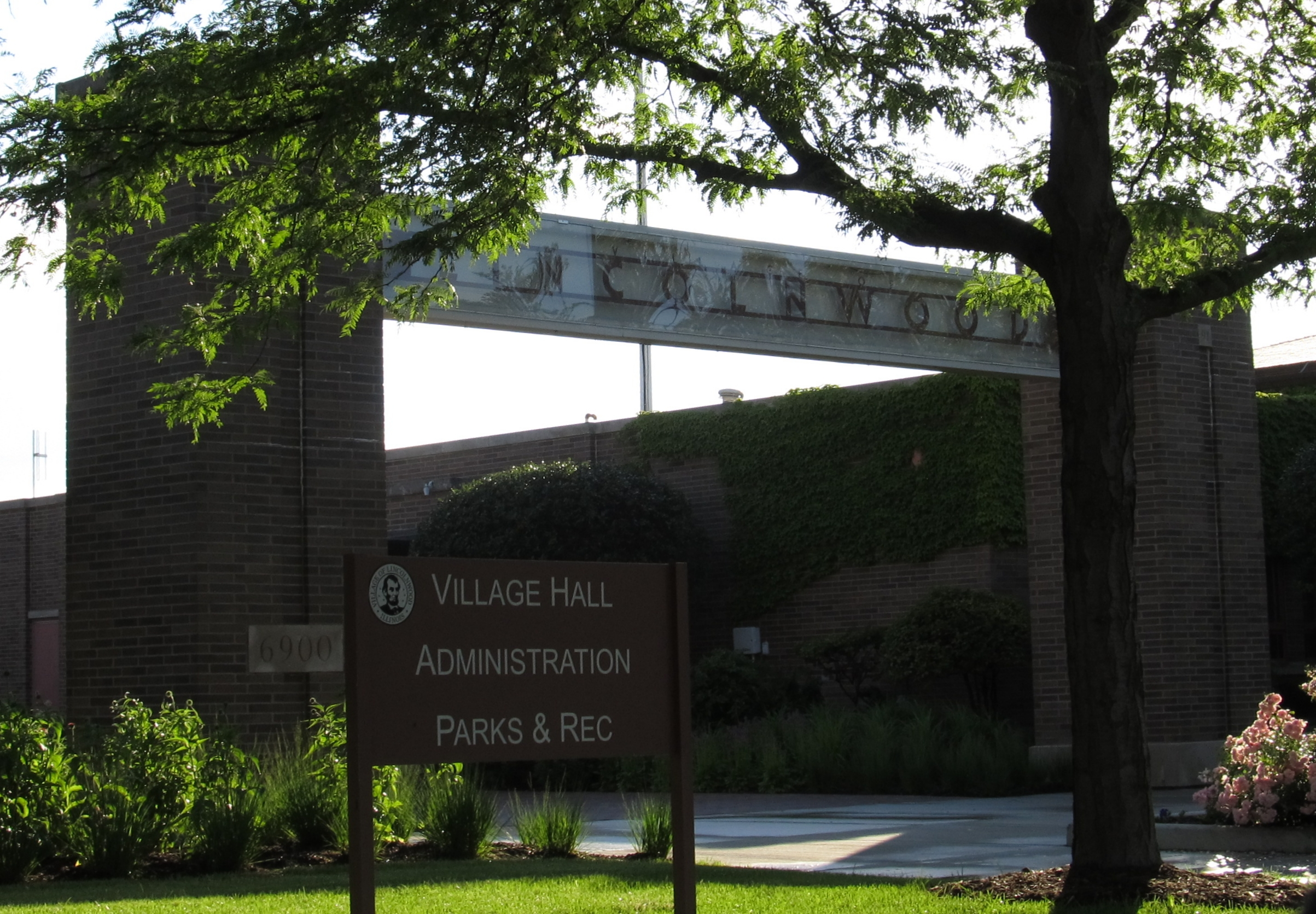
- Lincolnwood Village Hall

- Seal

- Location of Lincolnwood in Cook County, Illinois.

- Location within Greater Chicago Location within Illinois Location within the United States
- Coordinates: 42°0′19″N 87°44′3″W
- Country: United States
- State: Illinois
- County: Cook
- Township: Niles
- Incorporated: 1922

Government
  - Type: Council–manager
  - Mayor: Jesal Patel

Area
  - Total: 2.69 sq mi (6.97 km^{2})
  - Land: 2.69 sq mi (6.97 km^{2})
  - Water: 0 sq mi (0.00 km^{2}) 0%

Population (2020)
  - Total: 13,463
  - Density: 5,001.8/sq mi (1,931.19/km^{2})
- Up 1.9% from 2000

Standard of living (2007-11)
  - Per capita income: $42,544
  - Median home value: $444,100
- ZIP Code: 60712
- Area code(s): 847, 224
- Geocode: 43744
- FIPS code: 17-43744
- Website: www.lincolnwoodil.org

Lincolnwood (formerly Tessville) is a village in Cook County, Illinois, United States. Per the 2020 census, the population was 13,463. An inner suburb of Chicago, it shares its southern, eastern, and a small section of its western boundary with Chicago, also bordering Skokie to the north and west.

== Geography ==
Lincolnwood is located at 42°0′19″N 87°44′3″W (42.005331, -87.734283).

According to the 2021 census gazetteer files, Lincolnwood has a total area of 2.69 square miles (6.97 km^{2}), all land. The North Shore Channel lies on its eastern border. Lincolnwood shares its southern, southeastern, and southwestern boundary with Chicago; northern and northwestern boundary with Skokie; and its eastern border with Chicago.

Although Lincolnwood is small, it is sectioned off into neighborhoods. The most notable is "The Towers", located west of the Edens Expressway. Another neighborhood is called the Terraces.

== Demographics ==
Historical population
Census	Pop.	Note	%±
1910	359		—
1920	355		−1.1%
1930	473		33.2%
1940	752		59.0%
1950	3,072		308.5%
1960	11,744		282.3%
1970	12,929		10.1%
1980	11,921		−7.8%
1990	11,365		−4.7%
2000	12,359		8.7%
2010	12,590		1.9%
2020	13,463		6.9%
U.S. Decennial Census; 2010 2020

=== Racial and ethnic composition ===
Lincolnwood village, Illinois – Racial and ethnic composition Note: the US Census treats Hispanic/Latino as an ethnic category. This table excludes Latinos from the racial categories and assigns them to a separate category. Hispanics/Latinos may be of any race.
Race / Ethnicity (NH = Non-Hispanic)	Pop 2000	Pop 2010	Pop 2020	% 2000	% 2010	% 2020
White alone (NH)	8,866	7,938	7,682	71.74%	63.05%	57.06%
Black or African American alone (NH)	46	129	248	0.37%	1.02%	1.84%
Native American or Alaska Native alone (NH)	3	6	7	0.02%	0.05%	0.05%
Asian alone (NH)	2,599	3,338	4,164	21.03%	26.51%	30.93%
Pacific Islander alone (NH)	3	0	1	0.02%	0.00%	0.01%
Other race alone (NH)	19	34	45	0.15%	0.27%	0.33%
Mixed race or Multiracial (NH)	306	286	323	2.48%	2.27%	2.40%
Hispanic or Latino (any race)	517	859	993	4.18%	6.82%	7.38%
Total	12,359	12,590	13,463	100.00%	100.00%	100.00%

=== 2020 census ===
As of the 2020 census, Lincolnwood had a population of 13,463, with 4,425 households and 3,285 families.

The median age was 46.2 years. 20.3% of residents were under the age of 18 and 26.9% were 65 years of age or older. For every 100 females there were 92.0 males, and for every 100 females age 18 and over there were 88.5 males age 18 and over.

100.0% of residents lived in urban areas, while 0.0% lived in rural areas.

Of the village's households, 32.1% had children under the age of 18 living in them. Of all households, 63.3% were married-couple households, 11.8% were households with a male householder and no spouse or partner present, and 22.9% were households with a female householder and no spouse or partner present. About 20.2% of all households were made up of individuals and 15.9% had someone living alone who was 65 years of age or older. Lincolnwood had 4,655 housing units, of which 4.9% were vacant; the homeowner vacancy rate was 1.1% and the rental vacancy rate was 8.6%. The population density was 5,001.11 inhabitants per square mile (1,930.94/km^{2}), and the average housing unit density was 1,729.20 per square mile (667.65/km^{2}).

=== Income and poverty ===
The median income for a household in the village was $90,422, and the median income for a family was $99,401. Males had a median income of $67,917 versus $38,378 for females. The per capita income for the village was $44,380. About 5.1% of families and 5.4% of the population were below the poverty line, including 2.1% of those under age 18 and 6.5% of those age 65 or over.

== Government ==
Lincolnwood was established as Tessville in 1911 and has a village form of government with a president (referred to as the Mayor) and six trustees elected at-large. A village manager professionally oversees day-to-day municipal operations.

The Lincolnwood Economic Development Commission has been established to ensure the continued enhancement of the local economy and improved tax base.

Mayor Henry Proesel was elected in 1931 and ended his 46 years in office in 1977, a record mostly unmatched by any other mayor in American history. Succeeding him was John Porcelli, who served two terms. Porcelli was followed by Frank Chulay, who also served two terms.

Lincolnwood's first woman mayor, Madeline Grant, succeeded Chulay, and in 1995 created a nine-member Economic Development Commission.

Peter Moy served as village trustee from 1995 to 2000, then as village president until 2005. He was the first Asian American to serve any municipality in Illinois as its president.

In 2005, Jerry Turry was elected mayor. Before serving as mayor, Turry served as village trustee from 1995 to 2005.

In April 2017, Barry Bass was elected mayor, after serving as a trustee since 2015.

In April 2019, Assyrian American activist Atour Sargon was elected as a village trustee. She became the first ethnic Assyrian in the village's history to be elected to the board of trustees.

In April 2021, Jesal Patel was elected mayor after serving as Trustee since 2007.

In politics, Lincolnwood leans Democratic. In 2012 59.4% of voters voted for Barack Obama, while 41.1% of voters voted for Mitt Romney. In the 2016 presidential election 64.5% of voters voted for Hillary Clinton, while 35.5% of voters voted for Donald Trump.

=== Public safety ===
Lincolnwood has a police station staffed by 34 personnel. The Lincolnwood Fire Department is housed in a facility operated by 28 full-timers. The Lincolnwood Fire Department was established through private contract in 1990. (Previously, village fire protection was provided through the City of Chicago.)

== Education ==
Lincolnwood is served by Lincolnwood School District 74, which has a one-campus setting with three main facilities named after the Lincoln family. Todd Hall serves as the education facility for preschoolers to early grade school students, Rutledge Hall serves elementary school students, and Lincoln Hall serves primarily junior high students. High school students attend Niles West High School in neighboring Skokie, part of District 219. Lincolnwood is part of the Oakton Community College District, which has a campus minutes away in Skokie. Northwestern University in Evanston, Loyola University in Chicago, Northeastern Illinois University in Chicago, and North Park University in Chicago are all within 10 miles (16 km) of the village.

In September 2012, there was much controversy about the village board's consideration of approving a zoning law change to allow the establishment of a public gun range and store in Lincolnwood 1/2 mile from schools and parks. In March 2013, the gun shop decided to sue the village in response to its denial of their shooting range proposal. A primary concern of residents is that the gun shop, one of "A small handful of gun stores, three from Cook County and one from Gary, Indiana, continue to be responsible for a disproportionate number of crime guns recovered from Chicago's streets."

=== Public library ===
The Lincolnwood Public Library, established in 1978, is located in the center of the village at Pratt and Lincoln Avenues. Madeline Grant was the main driving force behind founding the library, and served as the first library president and later village president.

The library is governed by a board of trustees that meets monthly to make decisions about Lincolnwood Public Library's services, finances, policies, and other business. The board of trustees is made up of trustees elected to four year terms. As of 2023, the executive director of the Lincolnwood Public Library is Susan Dove Lempke.

The library has a substantial Historical Collection that includes materials that address the Village of Lincolnwood's history from the time of the Village of Tessville until the COVID-19 pandemic. The library is also home to a Library of Things, where Lincolnwood residents can check out items not traditionally found in libraries, including bike repair kits, Dungeon & Dragons kits, Rokus, photography equipment, and more.

== Recreation ==
The village's Recreation Department operates several recreation programs: an outdoor pool complex, 9 tennis courts, 11 baseball diamonds, a community center, as well as 13 parks (34 acres in total).

In the early 1970s, Lincolnwood's Boys Baseball program produced two Big League World Series champions, (1970 and 1973), runner-up in 1972, a fourth-place finish in the Senior League World Series (1972), and was a Big League World Series participant again in 1974, finishing third.

The Skokie Valley Trail runs through the town. As well as the North Shore Channel Trail.

== Economy ==
Lincolnwood is home to the Lincolnwood Town Center, an indoor mall containing over 100 shops. Neighborhood shopping is available in the village along Lincoln Avenue, Devon Avenue, and Touhy Avenue. Additional shopping is just a short drive away at the Westfield Old Orchard, Golf Mill Shopping Center and Village Crossing Center.

Lincolnwood is also home to many dining options, one being L. Woods. A scene from Ocean's Twelve was filmed there; the room in which it was filmed was renamed the "Ocean's Twelve room".

== Healthcare ==
Evanston Hospital (NorthShore University HealthSystem, affiliated with the University of Chicago Medical Center) has a facility in Lincolnwood, at the intersection of McCormick and Pratt. NorthShore University HealthSystem is composed of Evanston Hospital, Glenbrook Hospital, Highland Park Hospital, Skokie Hospital etc.

Saint Francis Hospital operates a health center in Lincolnwood. Its main hospital and medical center are about 2 1/2 miles and about 6 minutes east in Evanston. Other area hospitals that serve Lincolnwood are Skokie Hospital, formerly Rush North Shore in Skokie and Swedish Covenant Hospital in Chicago. Resurrection Hospital and Evanston Hospital, a teaching hospital, are also minutes away and serve Lincolnwood.

== Transportation ==
Bus service in the village is provided by both Pace and CTA.

== Notable people ==
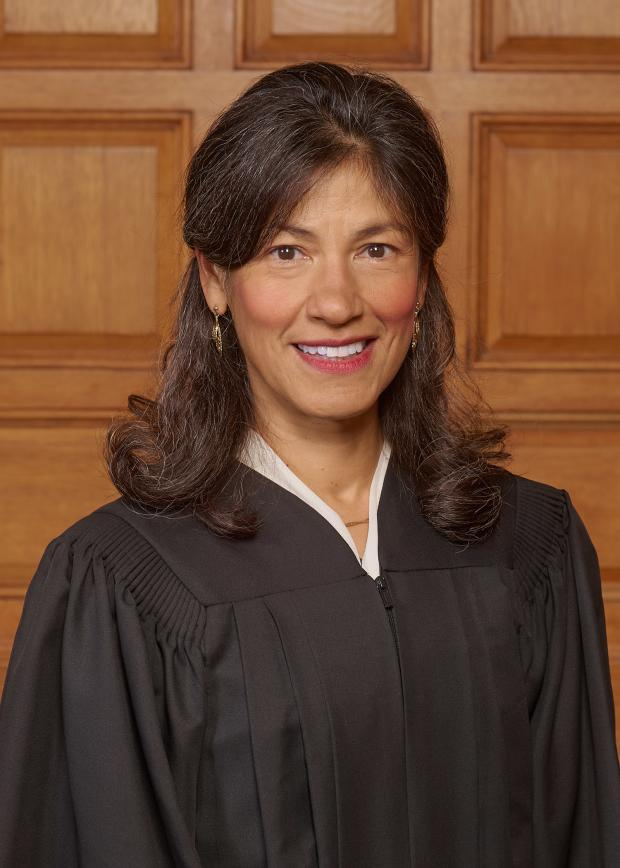
Dalila Argaez Wendlandt

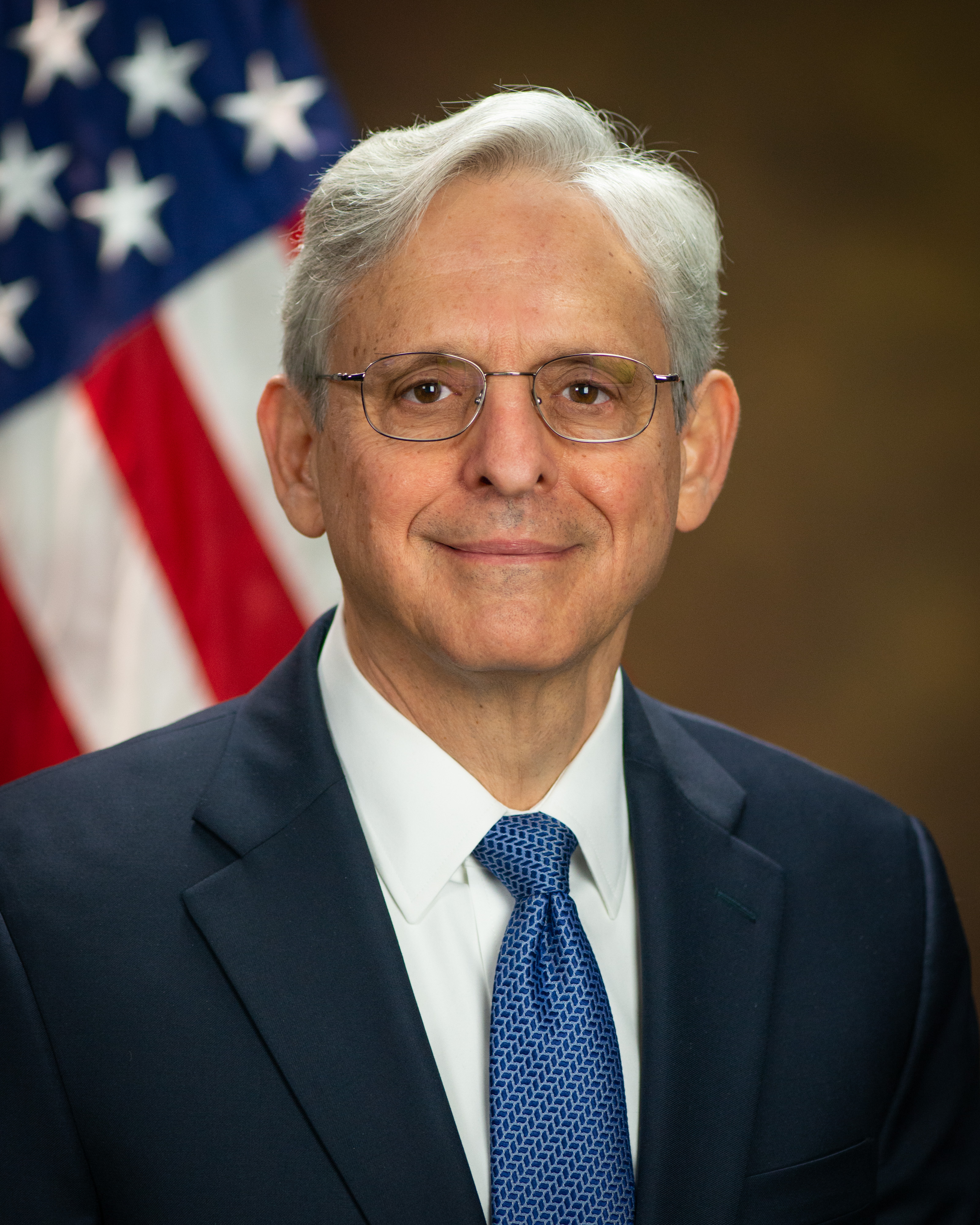
Merrick Garland

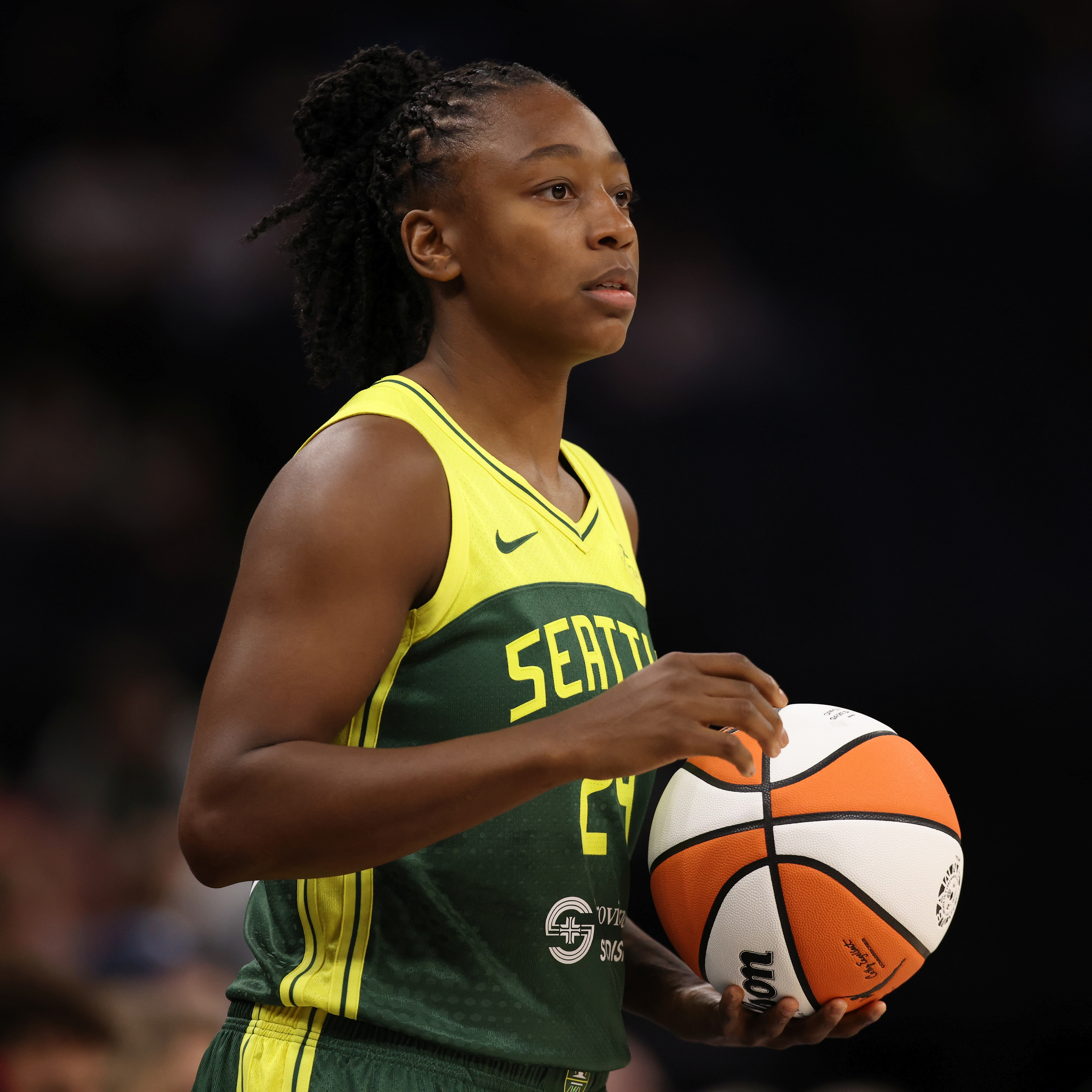
Jewell Loyd

- Allen Dorfman (1923–1983), Teamsters official, confidant of Jimmy Hoffa and noted organized crime figure, resident of Lincolnwood. Dorfman was murdered in the parking lot of Lincolnwood's Purple Hotel in January 1983.
- Richard Elrod (1934–2014) former Cook County Sheriff, state legislator, Circuit Court of Cook County judge; received notoriety in 1969 when he was seriously injured while assisting police during the Days of Rage anti-Vietnam War protests in downtown Chicago, which left him partially paralyzed
- Merrick Garland (born 1952), 86th Attorney General of the United States (2021–2025); nominee, Associate Justice of the United States Supreme Court (2016); Judge, United States Court of Appeals for the District of Columbia Circuit (1997–2021), served as Chief Judge (2013–2020)
- Gabby Hartnett (1900–1972), Chicago Cubs catcher and member of National Baseball Hall of Fame (1955). Resident of Lincolnwood and owner of a local bowling alley.
- William Heirens (1928–2012), serial killer known as the "Lipstick Killer", scrawled messages in lipstick at his Chicago murder scenes, served 65 years in prison and later recanted his confession, evidence of guilt disputed
- George Kontos (born 1985), former Major League Baseball pitcher; pitched for San Francisco Giants in 2012 World Series; current broadcaster for the San Francisco Giants, born and raised in Lincolnwood.
- Gary Kremen (born 1963), the engineer and entrepreneur who invented online dating and founded the personals site Match.com; born in Lincolnwood.
- Jim Irsay (1959-2025), owner of the Indianapolis Colts; born in Lincolnwood
- Jewell Loyd (born 1993), professional basketball player currently playing for the Las Vegas Aces of the WNBA (league champion, with Seattle Storm, 2018, 2020; with Las Vegas Aces, 2025), Gold Medal, Tokyo 2020 Olympics. Gold Medal, Paris 2024 Olympics
- Steve Marmel (born 1964), television writer and producer, born and raised in Lincolnwood.
- Sean Marshall (born 1982- ), former baseball pitcher (MLB 2006–2014) for Chicago Cubs and Cincinnati Reds, television baseball analyst, Lincolnwood resident
- Jim Moran (1918–2007), pioneering automobile dealer, billionaire, philanthropist, long-time Lincolnwood resident
- George Papadopoulos (born 1987), political campaign apparatchik, first individual charged by Robert Mueller in his investigation of Donald Trump 2016 presidential campaign ties to Russia. Pleaded guilty to lying to FBI agents about his contacts with Russian operatives, and served time in prison. Later pardoned by President Trump.
- Art Petacque (1924–2001), winner of 1974 Pulitzer Prize, long-time Chicago Sun-Times reporter.
- Richard Powers (born 1957), winner of 2019 Pulitzer Prize for fiction for The Overstory; 2006 National Book Award for The Echo Maker.
- William Rick Singer (born 1960), central figure in Operation Varsity Blues 2019 college admissions scandal.
- Todd Sucherman (born 1969), professional American drummer, presently with the band Styx.
- David J. Steiner (1965–2016), documentary filmmaker and educator, whose film Saving Barbara Sizemore documented the efforts to keep open an afrocentric charter school on South Side of Chicago that had been targeted for closure. Steiner was killed in a bus accident in Uganda while shooting a film about South Sudanese refugees in that country.
- Carol Wayne (1942–1985), television and film actress; frequent guest on The Tonight Show Starring Johnny Carson.
- Dalila Argaez Wendlandt (born 1969), Associate Justice, Massachusetts Supreme Judicial Court (2020—present), highest court in that state, first Latina to serve on that court.
