= National Register of Historic Places listings in Illinois =

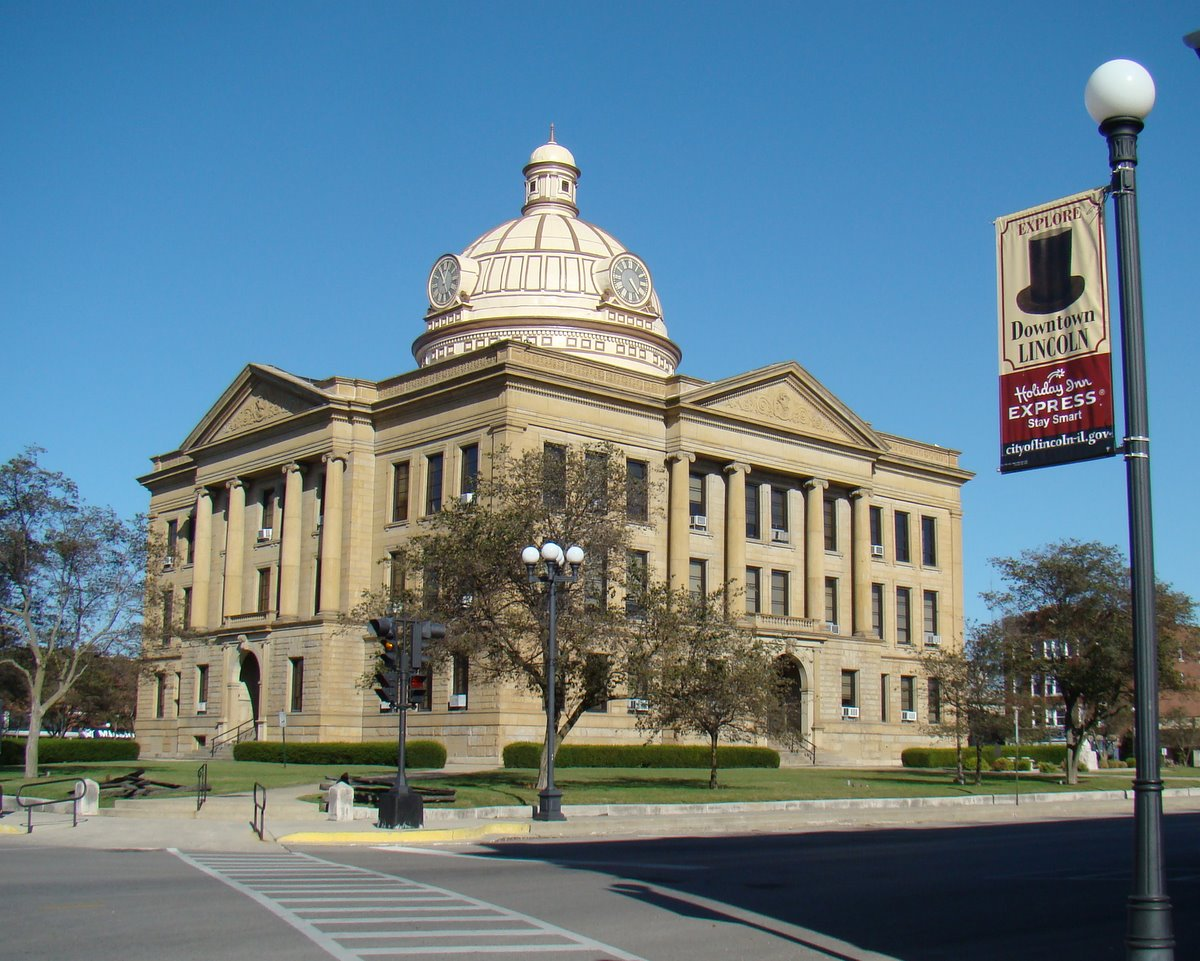
Lincoln Courthouse Square Historic District, Logan County

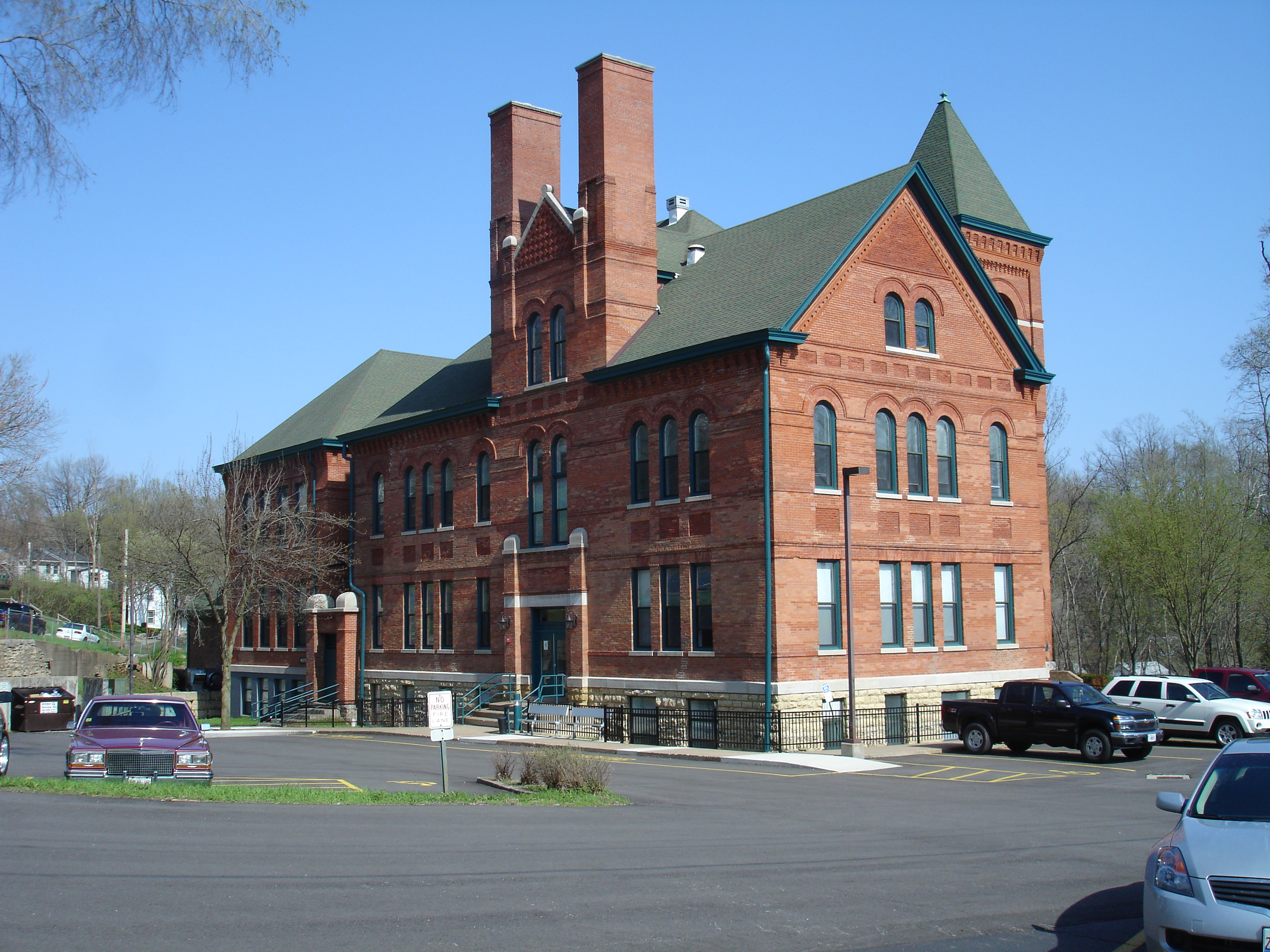
East Dubuque School, Jo Daviess County

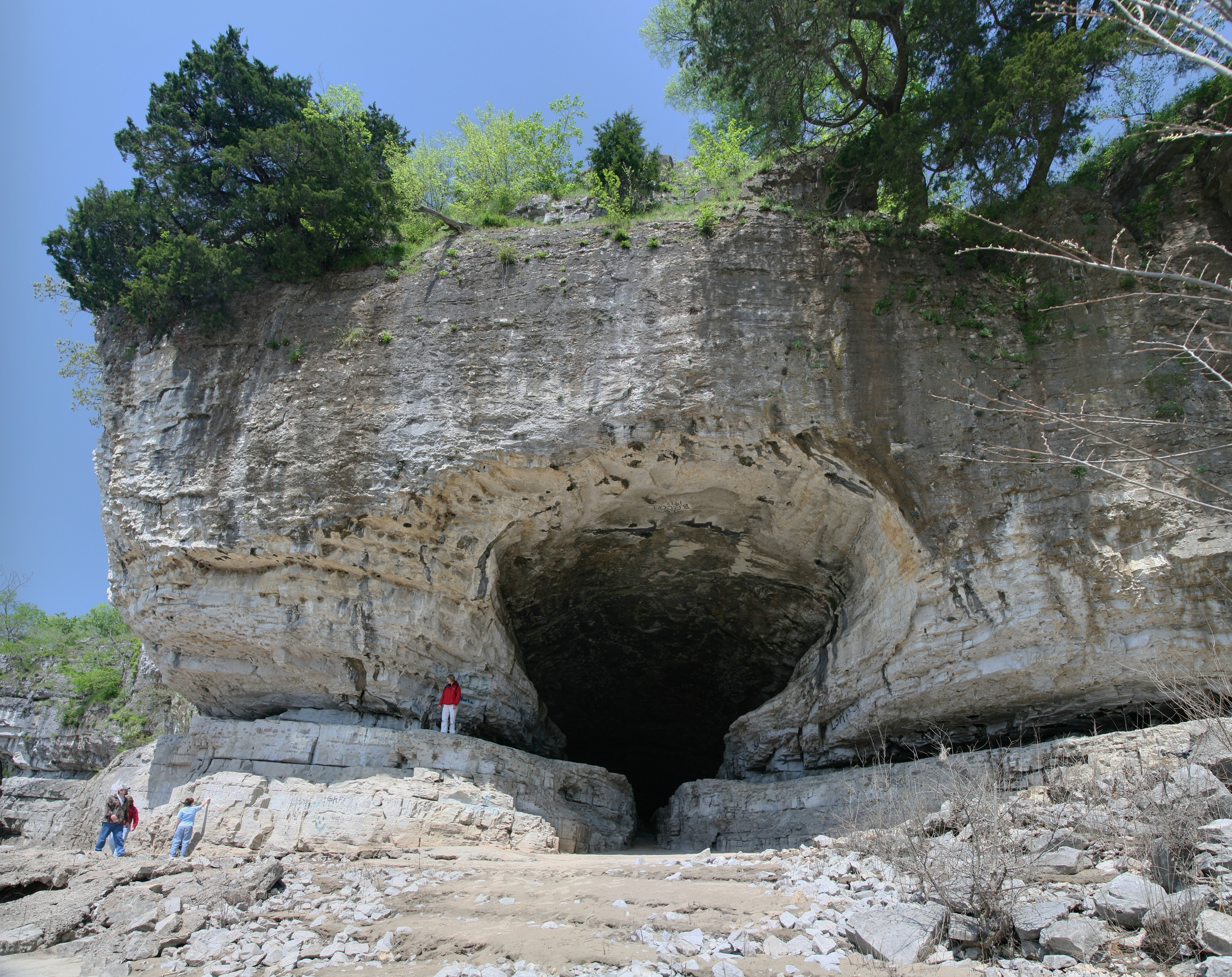
Cave-In-Rock, Hardin County

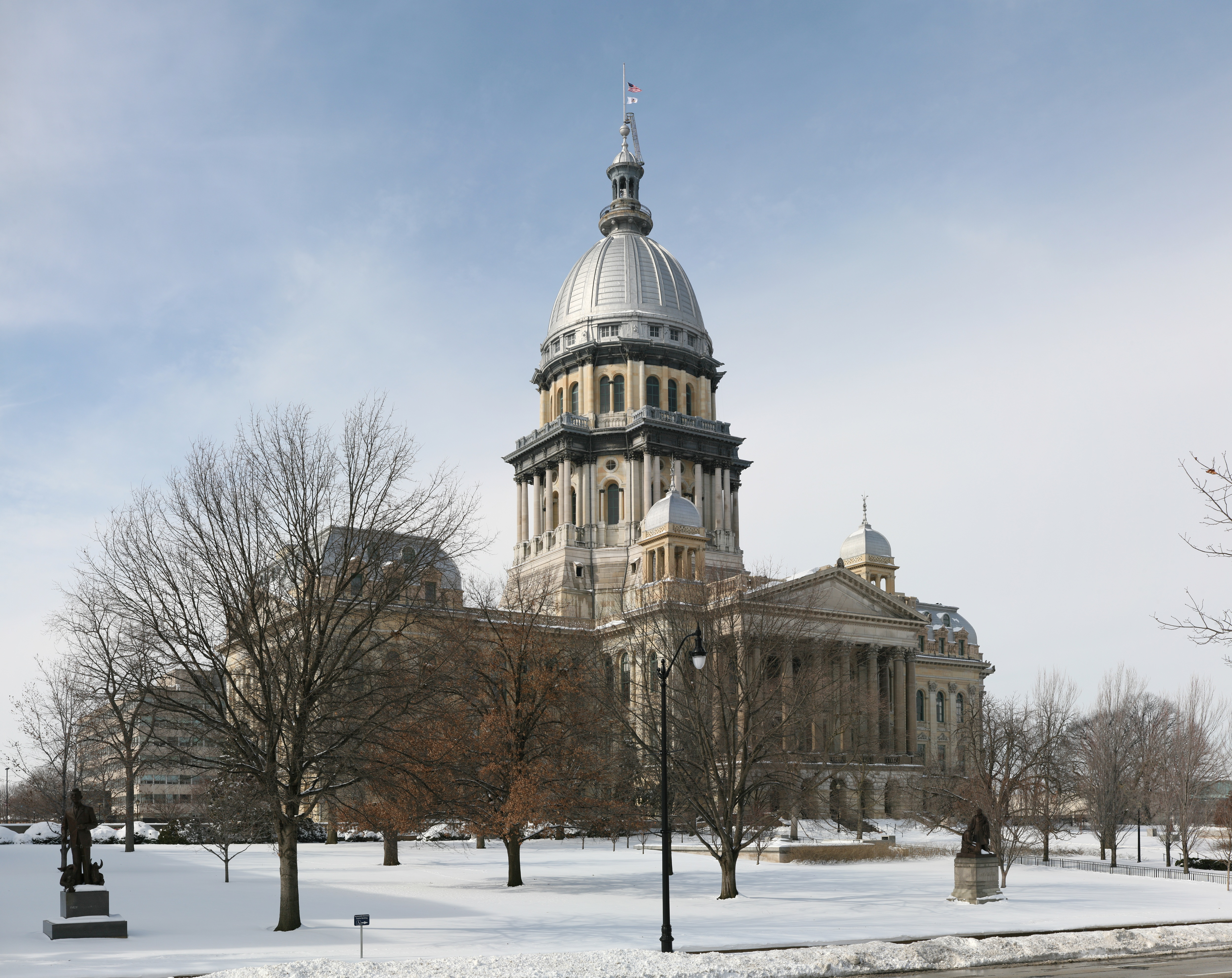
Illinois State Capitol, Sangamon County

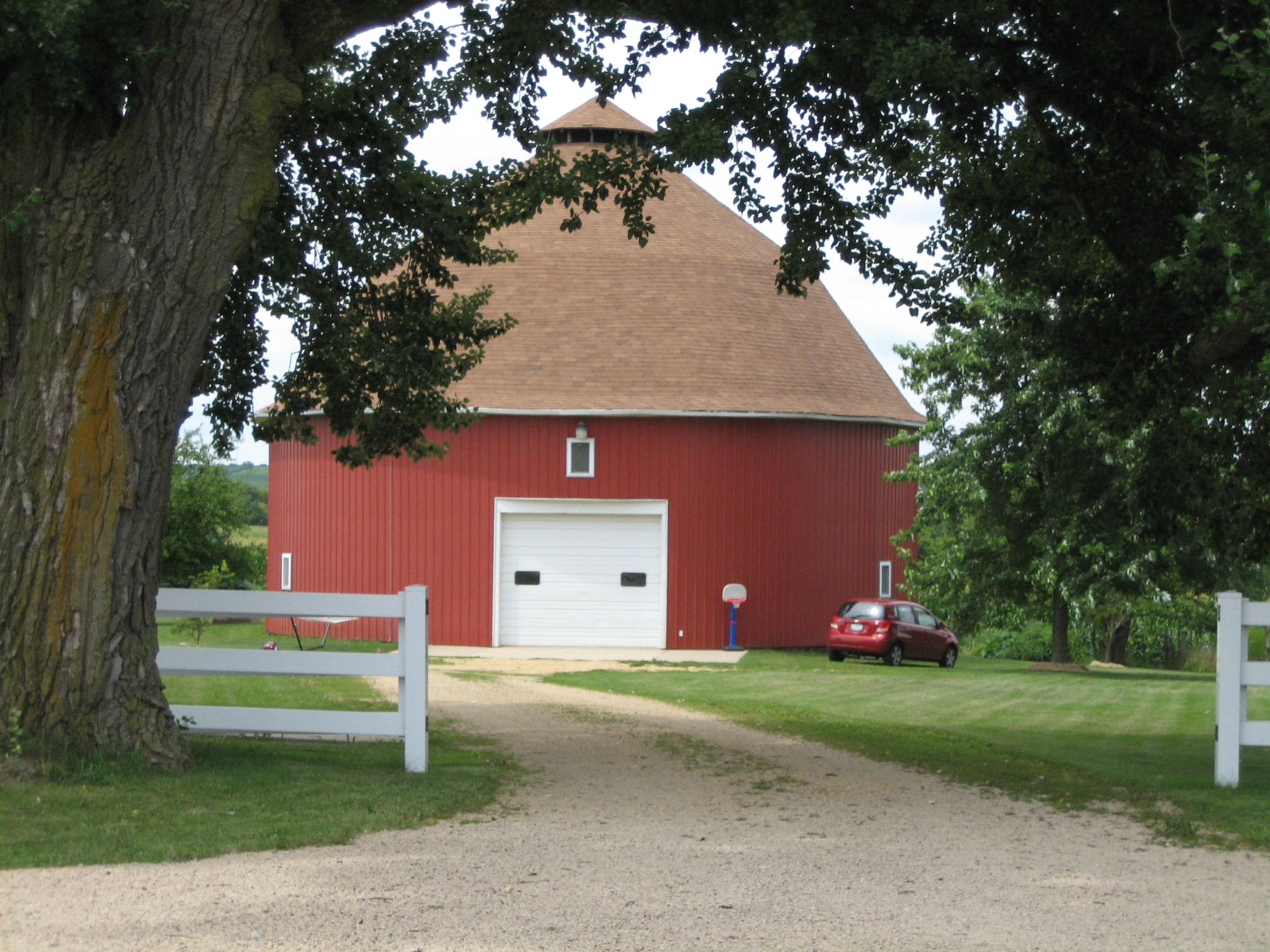
Dennis Otte Round Barn, Stephenson County

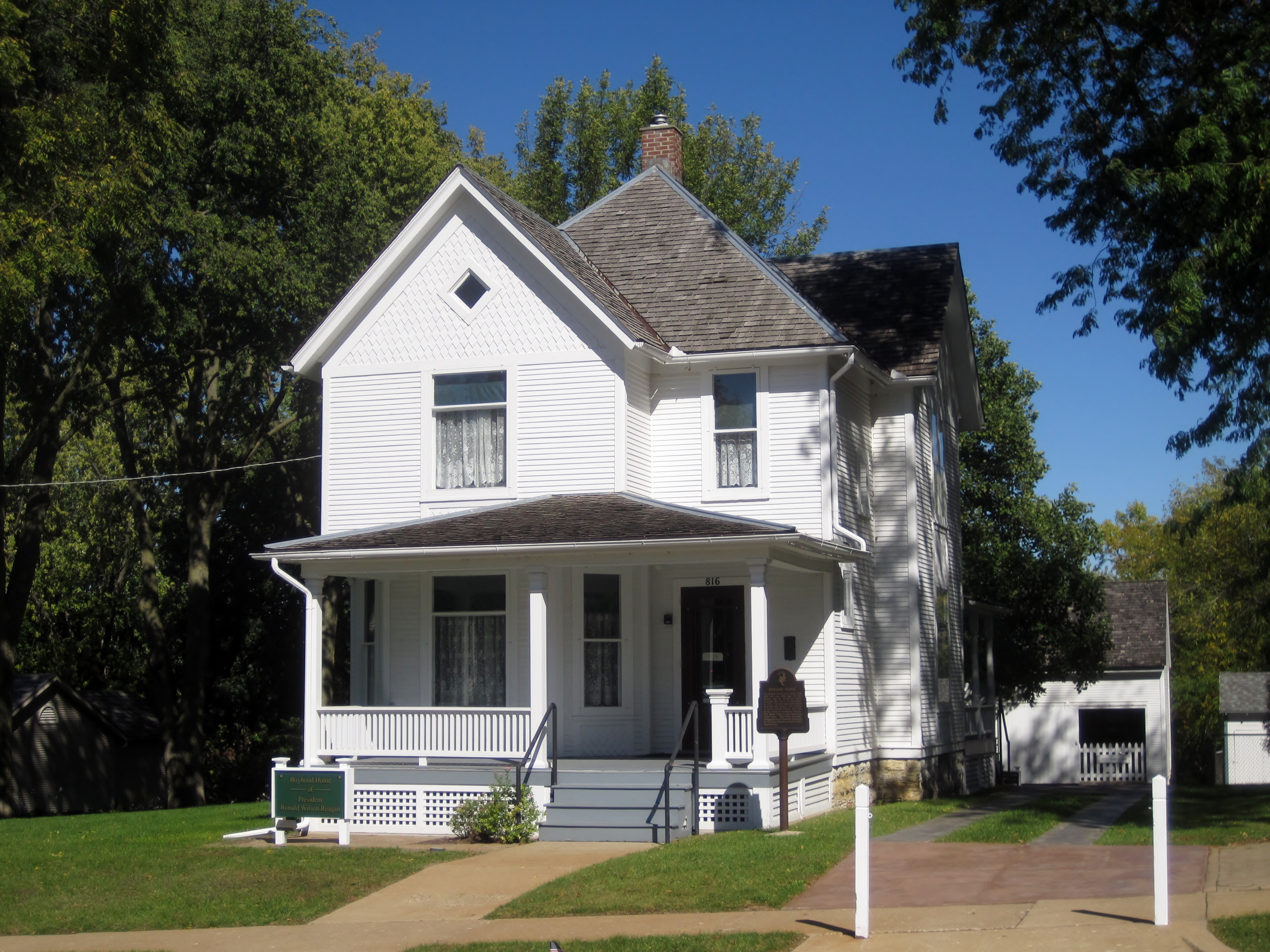
Ronald Reagan Boyhood Home, Lee County

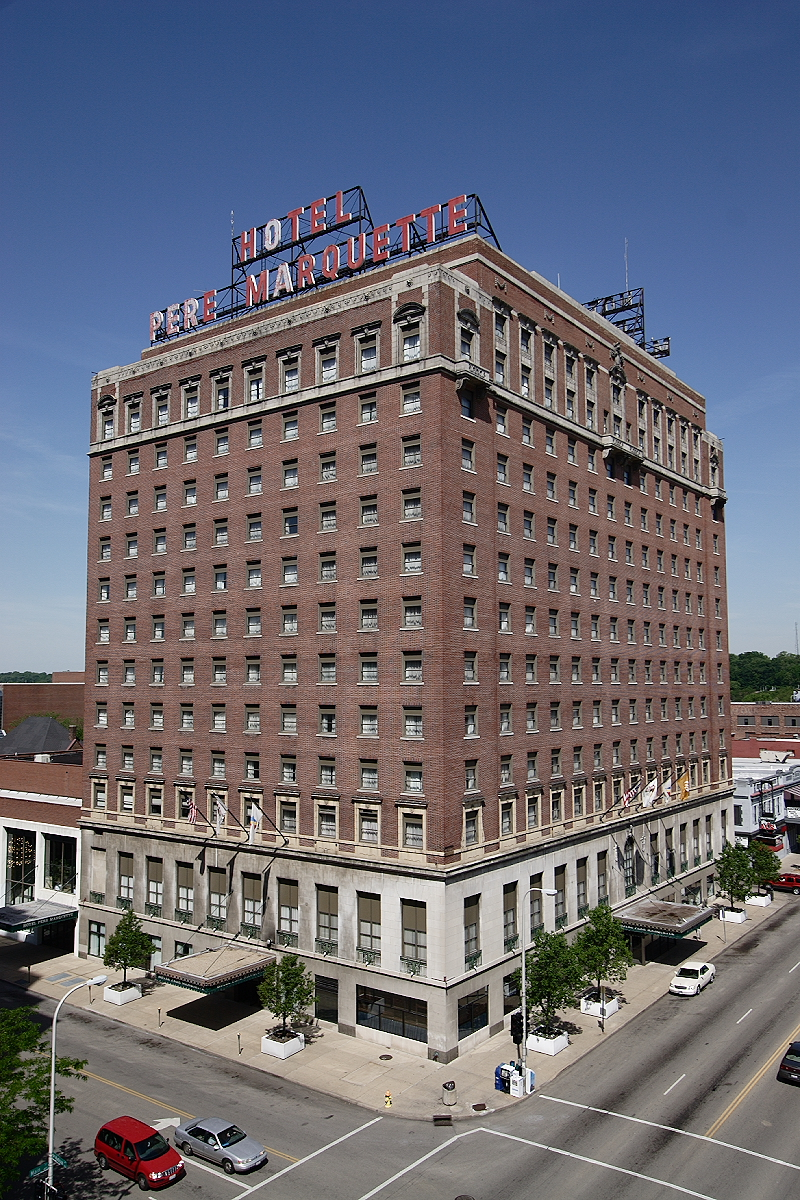
Pere Marquette Hotel, Peoria County

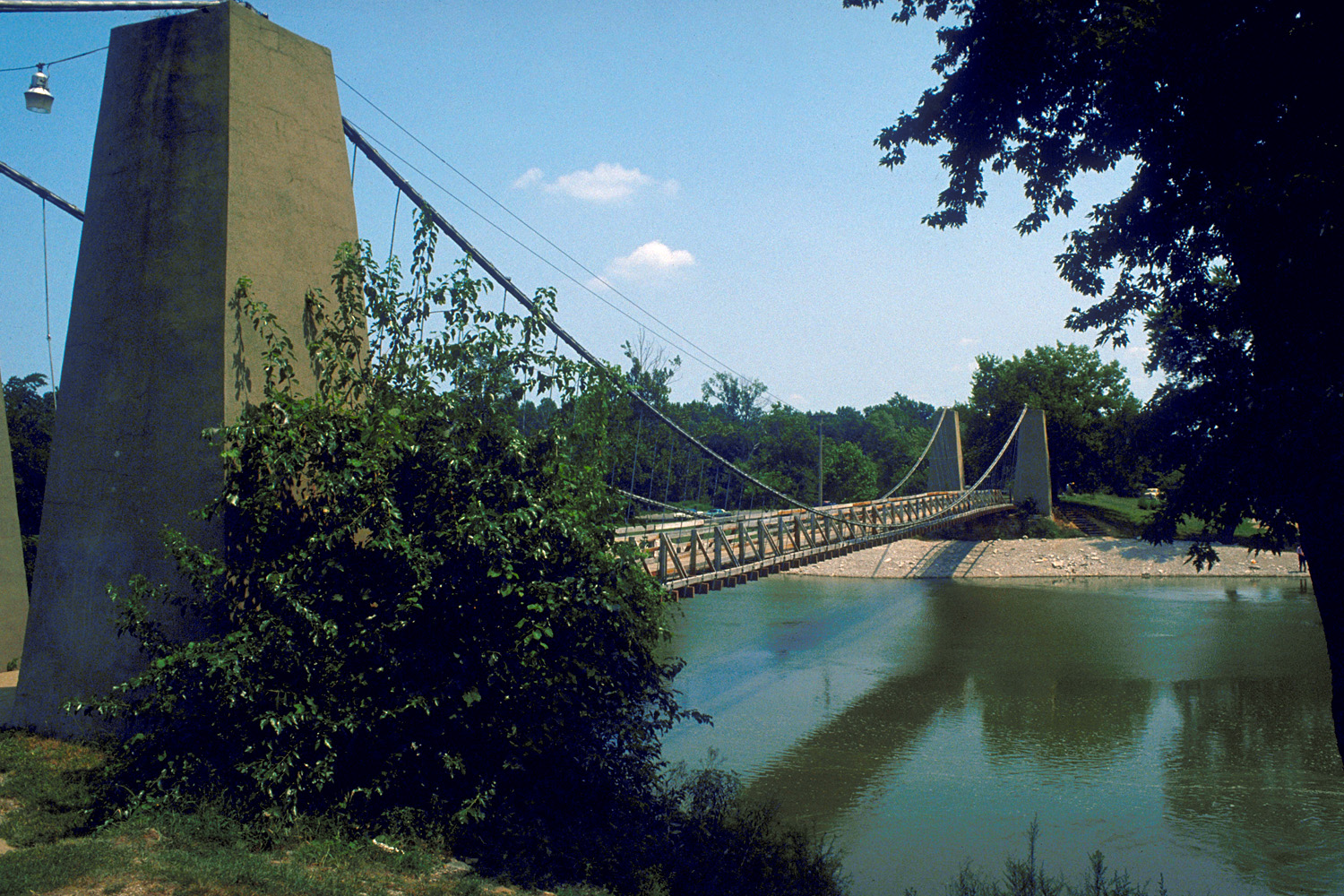
General Dean Suspension Bridge, Clinton County

This is a list of properties and districts in Illinois that are on the National Register of Historic Places. There are over 1,900 in total. Of these, 85 are National Historic Landmarks. There are listings in all of the state's 102 counties.

This National Park Service list is complete through NPS recent listings posted September 25, 2026.

== Numbers of listings by county ==
	County	# of Sites
1	Adams	27
2	Alexander	8
3	Bond	2
4	Boone	6
5	Brown	2
6	Bureau	19
7	Calhoun	7
8	Carroll	7
9	Cass	2
10	Champaign	60
11	Christian	6
12	Clark	9
13	Clay	6
14	Clinton	2
15	Coles	21
16.1	Cook: Central Chicago	124
16.2	Cook: North Side Chicago	100
16.3	Cook: South Side Chicago	107
16.4	Cook: West Side Chicago	79
16.5	Cook: Evanston	62
16.6	Cook: Other	141
	Cook: Duplicates	(4)
	Cook: Total	609
17	Crawford	7
18	Cumberland	3
19	DeKalb	18
20	DeWitt	2
21	Douglas	3
22	DuPage	52
23	Edgar	9
24	Edwards	1
25	Effingham	3
26	Fayette	4
27	Ford	5
28	Franklin	3
29	Fulton	42
30	Gallatin	6
31	Greene	11
32	Grundy	8
33	Hamilton	4
34	Hancock	13
35	Hardin	5
36	Henderson	4
37	Henry	15
38	Iroquois	7
39	Jackson	20
40	Jasper	1
41	Jefferson	2
42	Jersey	21
43	Jo Daviess	19
44	Johnson	4
45	Kane	82
46	Kankakee	16
47	Kendall	11
48	Knox	7
49	LaSalle	34
50	Lake	98
51	Lawrence	2
52	Lee	10
53	Livingston	15
54	Logan	12
55	Macon	11
56	Macoupin	8
57	Madison	44
58	Marion	8
59	Marshall	2
60	Mason	4
61	Massac	3
62	McDonough	8
63	McHenry	14
64	McLean	36
65	Menard	5
66	Mercer	12
67	Monroe	7
68	Montgomery	13
69	Morgan	10
70	Moultrie	1
71	Ogle	29
72	Peoria	36
73	Perry	3
74	Piatt	6
75	Pike	14
76	Pope	4
77	Pulaski	4
78	Putnam	4
79	Randolph	18
80	Richland	4
81	Rock Island	29
82	St. Clair	30
83	Saline	4
84	Sangamon	64
85	Schuyler	2
86	Scott	2
87	Shelby	6
88	Stark	3
89	Stephenson	16
90	Tazewell	17
91	Union	9
92	Vermilion	13
93	Wabash	1
94	Warren	11
95	Washington	3
96	Wayne	3
97	White	11
98	Whiteside	14
99	Will	39
100	Williamson	5
101	Winnebago	43
102	Woodford	7
(duplicates)		(11)
Total:		2,000

== Bond County ==
	Name on the Register	Image	Date listed	Location	City or town	Description
1	Greenville Public Library	Greenville Public Library	August 4, 1995 (#95000991)	414 W. Main Avenue; 38°53′30″N 89°24′57″W	Greenville	
2	Old Main, Almira College	Old Main, Almira College	April 21, 1975 (#75000638)	315 E. College St. 38°53′36″N 89°24′32″W	Greenville	Hogue Hall at Greenville College. Demolished in 2008.

== Boone County ==
	Name on the Register	Image	Date listed	Location	City or town	Description
1	Belvidere North State Street Historic District	Belvidere North State Street Historic District	June 6, 2012 (#12000324)	State Street between Hurlbut Street & Kishwaukee River; 42°15′38″N 88°50′39″W	Belvidere	
2	Belvidere South State Street Historic District	Belvidere South State Street Historic District	June 6, 2012 (#12000325)	State Street between Logan Avenue & Madison Street; 42°15′21″N 88°50′23″W	Belvidere	
3	Belvidere High School	Belvidere High School	July 25, 1997 (#97000815)	Jct. of Pearl and First Sts. 42°15′17″N 88°50′27″W	Belvidere	
4	Lampert-Wildflower House	Lampert-Wildflower House	August 12, 2005 (#05000870)	410 East Lincoln Avenue; 42°15′44″N 88°50′28″W	Belvidere	
5	Pettit Memorial Chapel	Pettit Memorial Chapel	December 1, 1978 (#78001112)	1100 N. Main St. 42°16′10″N 88°50′50″W	Belvidere	
6	United States Post Office-Belvidere	United States Post Office-Belvidere	May 11, 2000 (#00000473)	200 S. State St. 42°15′28″N 88°50′27″W	Belvidere	

== Brown County ==
	Name on the Register	Image	Date listed	Location	City or town	Description
1	La Grange Lock and Dam Historic District	La Grange Lock and Dam Historic District	March 10, 2004 (#04000170)	0.75 miles (1.21 km) south of County Road 795N at the Illinois River; 39°56′27″N 90°32′02″W	Versailles	
2	Mount Sterling Commercial Historic District	Mount Sterling Commercial Historic District	May 8, 1987 (#87000724)	Roughly bounded by Brown Co. Courthouse, Alley E of Capitol, South St., and Alley W of Capitol; 39°59′12″N 90°45′51″W	Mount Sterling	

=== Former listing ===
	Name on the Register	Image	Date listed	Date removed	Location	City or town	Description
1	Benjamin Dewitt House		July 28, 1983 (#83000300)	December 8, 1995	Address Restricted	Versailles	

== Cass County ==
	Name on the Register	Image	Date listed	Location	City or town	Description
1	Beardstown Grand Opera House	Beardstown Grand Opera House	May 11, 2000 (#00000471)	121 State St. 40°01′03″N 90°26′03″W	Beardstown	
2	Andrew Cunningham Farm	Andrew Cunningham Farm	May 12, 1975 (#75000641)	2.5 miles east of Virginia off Gridley Rd. 39°57′05″N 90°09′30″W	Virginia	

=== Former listing ===
	Name on the Register	Image	Date listed	Date removed	Location	City or town	Description
1	Park House		February 10, 1983 (#83000304)	December 8, 1995	200 W. 2nd St.	Beardstown	

== Christian County ==
	Name on the Register	Image	Date listed	Location	City or town	Description
1	Bolivia Road Bridge	Bolivia Road Bridge	January 28, 2004 (#03001464)	Across the North Fork of the Sangamon River; 39°46′03″N 89°20′44″W	Bolivia	Extends into Sangamon County
2	Illinois State Bank Building	Illinois State Bank Building	August 16, 1984 (#84000923)	201 N. Chestnut St. 39°31′14″N 89°02′59″W	Assumption	
3	Louis Jehle House	Louis Jehle House	April 20, 1995 (#95000490)	511 E. 5th St. 39°23′02″N 89°04′33″W	Pana	
4	Kitchell Park	Kitchell Park	November 5, 1992 (#92001538)	Junction of 9th and Kitchell Sts. 39°22′43″N 89°04′47″W	Pana	
5	Taylorville Chautauqua Auditorium	Taylorville Chautauqua Auditorium	January 21, 1988 (#87002519)	Manners Park; 39°32′23″N 89°17′45″W	Taylorville	
6	Taylorville Courthouse Square Historic District	Taylorville Courthouse Square Historic District	December 2, 1985 (#85003058)	Roughly bounded by Vine, Walnut, Adams, and Webster Sts. 39°32′53″N 89°17′42″W	Taylorville	

== Clay County ==
	Name on the Register	Image	Date listed	Location	City or town	Description
1	Baltimore and Ohio Railroad Depot	Baltimore and Ohio Railroad Depot	February 20, 1998 (#98000112)	225 W. Railroad St. 38°40′04″N 88°29′18″W	Flora	
2	Clay County Courthouse	Clay County Courthouse	May 18, 2015 (#15000224)	300 Broadway St. 38°46′24″N 88°29′55″W	Louisville	
3	Clay County Jail	Clay County Jail	August 6, 1998 (#98000986)	195 Main St. 38°46′20″N 88°30′03″W	Louisville	
4	Pearl and Bess Meyer House	Pearl and Bess Meyer House	February 9, 2001 (#01000084)	233 E. 2nd St. 38°40′14″N 88°29′02″W	Flora	
5	Paine House	Paine House	November 14, 1985 (#85002843)	Rt. 1, Box 19 A 38°38′19″N 88°38′05″W	Xenia	
6	Shriver House	Shriver House	May 9, 1983 (#83000306)	117 E. 3rd St. 38°40′15″N 88°29′10″W	Flora	

== Clinton County ==
	Name on the Register	Image	Date listed	Location	City or town	Description
1	General Dean Suspension Bridge	General Dean Suspension Bridge	April 3, 1973 (#73000693)	E of Carlyle over the Kaskaskia River; 38°36′40″N 89°21′26″W	Carlyle	
2	James C. Twiss House	James C. Twiss House	February 17, 2010 (#10000020)	298 N. Page St. 38°36′40″N 89°36′22″W	Aviston	

== Cumberland County ==
	Name on the Register	Image	Date listed	Location	City or town	Description
1	Cumberland County Courthouse	Cumberland County Courthouse	June 11, 1981 (#81000220)	Court House Sq. 39°16′21″N 88°14′41″W	Toledo	
2	Greenup Commercial Historic District	Greenup Commercial Historic District	February 21, 1991 (#91000083)	122 E.-123 W. Cumberland Street, 102 N.-203 S. Kentucky Street, 101 N. Mill Street and 101 E.-100 W. Illinois St. 39°14′47″N 88°09′51″W	Greenup	
3	Thornton Ward Estate	Thornton Ward Estate	December 4, 2001 (#01001308)	1387 U.S. Route 40; 39°13′40″N 88°12′51″W	Toledo	

== DeWitt County ==
	Name on the Register	Image	Date listed	Location	City or town	Description
1	Magill House	Magill House	November 28, 2003 (#03001202)	100 N. Center St. 40°09′12″N 88°57′39″W	Clinton	
2	C. H. Moore House	C. H. Moore House	March 23, 1979 (#79003112)	219 E. Woodlawn St. 40°09′38″N 88°57′29″W	Clinton	

== Douglas County ==
	Name on the Register	Image	Date listed	Location	City or town	Description
1	Arcola Carnegie Public Library	Arcola Carnegie Public Library	May 9, 2002 (#02000459)	407 E. Main St. 39°41′04″N 88°18′12″W	Arcola	
2	Henson House		December 31, 2020 (#100005967)	103 North Henson Rd. 39°51′48″N 88°09′03″W	Villa Grove	
3	Streibich Blacksmith Shop	Streibich Blacksmith Shop	February 21, 1991 (#91000086)	1 N. Howard St. 39°47′53″N 87°58′58″W	Newman	

=== Former listing ===
	Name on the Register	Image	Date listed	Date removed	Location	City or town	Description
1	John McCarty Round Barn		December 7, 1982 (#82000394)	December 8, 1995	Northwest of Filson	Filson	

== Edwards County ==
	Name on the Register	Image	Date listed	Location	City or town	Description
1	St. John's Episcopal Church	St. John's Episcopal Church	February 15, 2012 (#12000027)	20 E. Cherry St. 38°22′32″N 88°03′27″W	Albion	

== Effingham County ==
	Name on the Register	Image	Date listed	Location	City or town	Description
1	Effingham County Courthouse	Effingham County Courthouse	September 11, 1985 (#85002304)	110 E. Jefferson St. 39°07′18″N 88°32′28″W	Effingham	
2	Heart Theater	Heart Theater	April 12, 2023 (#100008843)	133 East Jefferson Ave. 39°07′17″N 88°32′28″W	Effingham	
3	Dr. Charles M. Wright House	Dr. Charles M. Wright House	May 8, 1986 (#86001018)	3 W. Jackson St. 39°03′57″N 88°44′53″W	Altamont	

== Fayette County ==
	Name on the Register	Image	Date listed	Location	City or town	Description
1	Floyd and Glenora Dycus House	Floyd and Glenora Dycus House	March 2, 2001 (#01000179)	305 S. Second St. 38°59′41″N 88°57′09″W	Brownstown	
2	First Presbyterian Church	First Presbyterian Church	March 24, 1982 (#82002534)	301 W. Main St. 38°57′43″N 89°05′37″W	Vandalia	
3	Little Brick House	Little Brick House	June 4, 1973 (#73000701)	621 St. Clair St. 38°57′56″N 89°05′54″W	Vandalia	
4	Vandalia Statehouse	Vandalia Statehouse	January 21, 1974 (#74000760)	315 W. Gallatin St. 38°57′40″N 89°05′38″W	Vandalia	

=== Former listings ===
	Name on the Register	Image	Date listed	Date removed	Location	City or town	Description
1	Clarence Forehand Round Barn		December 7, 1982 (#82000394)	December 8, 1995	West of Vandalia off Illinois Route 185	Vandalia	Destroyed by strong winds, May 26, 1989.
2	PRESIDENT	PRESIDENT	December 20, 1989 (#89002460)	July 13, 2011	Scattered over two acres in three separate locations around St. Elmo	St. Elmo	Formerly a National Historic Landmark

== Ford County ==
	Name on the Register	Image	Date listed	Location	City or town	Description
1	Dunnan-Hampton House	Dunnan-Hampton House	May 22, 2007 (#07000455)	511 W. Pells St. 40°27′46″N 88°06′15″W	Paxton	
2	Paxton Carnegie Public Library	Paxton Carnegie Public Library	May 9, 2002 (#02000463)	254 S. Market St. 40°27′38″N 88°05′54″W	Paxton	
3	Paxton First Schoolhouse	Paxton First Schoolhouse	January 29, 1980 (#80001354)	406 E. Franklin St. 40°27′17″N 88°05′39″W	Paxton	
4	Paxton Water Tower and Pump House	Paxton Water Tower and Pump House	November 13, 1984 (#84000302)	145 S. Market St. 40°27′36″N 88°05′49″W	Paxton	
5	Alfred Phillips House	Alfred Phillips House	February 5, 1999 (#99000113)	404 N. Melvin St. 40°28′09″N 88°22′13″W	Gibson City	

== Franklin County ==
	Name on the Register	Image	Date listed	Location	City or town	Description
1	Franklin County Jail	Franklin County Jail	February 5, 1999 (#99000111)	209 W. Main St. 37°59′49″N 88°55′21″W	Benton	
2	Sesser Opera House	Sesser Opera House	March 12, 1982 (#82002535)	106 W. Franklin Ave. 38°05′31″N 89°03′02″W	Sesser	
3	West Frankfort City Hall	West Frankfort City Hall	May 9, 2002 (#02000460)	108 N. Emma St. 37°53′59″N 88°55′35″W	West Frankfort	

== Hamilton County ==
	Name on the Register	Image	Date listed	Location	City or town	Description
1	Cloud State Bank	Cloud State Bank	November 28, 1978 (#78001149)	108 S. Washington St. 38°05′36″N 88°32′12″W	McLeansboro	
2	Aaron G. Cloud House	Aaron G. Cloud House	April 15, 1978 (#78001150)	164 S. Washington St. 38°05′35″N 88°32′12″W	McLeansboro	
3	Chalon Guard and Emma Blades Cloud House	Chalon Guard and Emma Blades Cloud House	February 18, 2009 (#09000026)	300 S. Washington St. 38°05′29″N 88°32′13″W	McLeansboro	
4	St. James Episcopal Church	St. James Episcopal Church	January 24, 1995 (#94001602)	111 N. Pearl St. 38°05′42″N 88°32′16″W	McLeansboro	

== Hardin County ==
	Name on the Register	Image	Date listed	Location	City or town	Description
1	Battery Rock	Battery Rock	November 5, 1998 (#98001257)	West Bank, River Mile 860, Ohio River; 37°31′46″N 88°04′52″W	Cave-in-Rock	
2	Cave-in-Rock	Cave-in-Rock	August 6, 1998 (#98000984)	0.5 miles north of the town of Cave-In-Rock; 37°28′02″N 88°09′34″W	Cave-In-Rock	
3	Illinois Iron Furnace	Illinois Iron Furnace	March 7, 1973 (#73000704)	Shawnee National Forest; 37°29′58″N 88°19′41″W	Near Rosiclare	
4	Orr-Herl Mound and Village Site	Orr-Herl Mound and Village Site	November 21, 1978 (#78001151)	Northern bank of the Ohio River midway between Elizabethtown and Rosiclare; 37°26′04″N 88°19′39″W	Near Rosiclare	
5	Rose Hotel	Rose Hotel	December 26, 1972 (#72000461)	Main St. 37°26′43″N 88°18′16″W	Elizabethtown	

== Henderson County ==
	Name on the Register	Image	Date listed	Location	City or town	Description
1	Lock and Dam No. 18 Historic District	Lock and Dam No. 18 Historic District	March 10, 2004 (#04000178)	1.5 mi. N of unnamed cty rd. from Gladstone; 40°52′55″N 91°01′27″W	Gladstone	Extends into Des Moines County, Iowa.
2	Oquawka Wagon Bridge	Oquawka Wagon Bridge	February 24, 1975 (#75000660)	2.5 miles (4.0 km) south of Oquawka over Henderson Creek; 40°53′39″N 90°56′57″W	Oquawka	
3	Alexis Phelps House	Alexis Phelps House	April 28, 1982 (#82002537)	On the Mississippi River; 40°56′21″N 90°57′20″W	Oquawka	
4	South Henderson Church and Cemetery	South Henderson Church and Cemetery	October 14, 1976 (#76000709)	East of Gladstone; 40°52′23″N 90°54′48″W	Gladstone	

== Iroquois County ==
	Name on the Register	Image	Date listed	Location	City or town	Description
1	Glenwood School		May 29, 2020 (#100005232)	1398 East 800 North Rd. 40°36′08″N 87°51′42″W	Cissna Park	
2	Old Iroquois County Courthouse	Old Iroquois County Courthouse	June 13, 1975 (#75000663)	Cherry Street at 2nd Street; 40°46′28″N 87°44′09″W	Watseka	
3	Prairie Dell Meetinghouse	Prairie Dell Meetinghouse	August 12, 2005 (#05000846)	Junction of 2550 East and 2150 North Rd. 40°49′34″N 87°38′40″W	Iroquois	
4	A. Herr and E. E. Smith Public Library	A. Herr and E. E. Smith Public Library	August 4, 1995 (#95000992)	105 Adams St. 40°31′04″N 88°04′14″W	Loda	
5	St. Mary's Church	St. Mary's Church	May 2, 1996 (#96000514)	308 St. Charles Avenue; 40°57′08″N 87°39′09″W	Beaverville	
6	Watseka Downtown Historic District	Watseka Downtown Historic District	March 12, 2026 (#100012297)	Roughly bound by First, Oak, Walnut, Fifth, and Union Pacific Railroad; 40°46′34″N 87°44′04″W	Watseka	
7	Watseka Union Depot	Watseka Union Depot	December 22, 1999 (#99001595)	S. 2nd St. 40°46′32″N 87°44′12″W	Watseka	Originally listed in 1988 with refnum #88003467. Delisted in early 1999 when it was moved from Cherry Street to current location.

== Jasper County ==
	Name on the Register	Image	Date listed	Location	City or town	Description
1	Embarras River Bridge	Embarras River Bridge	May 20, 1998 (#98000472)	Wade Township Road 164 over the Embarras River; 38°59′43″N 88°09′43″W	Newton	

== Jefferson County ==
	Name on the Register	Image	Date listed	Location	City or town	Description
1	Appellate Court, 5th District	Appellate Court, 5th District	July 2, 1973 (#73000705)	14th and Main Sts. 38°19′02″N 88°54′30″W	Mount Vernon	
2	C. H. Judd House	C. H. Judd House	December 8, 1983 (#83003571)	Ina-Belle Rive Rd. 38°09′29″N 88°45′56″W	Belle Rive	

== Johnson County ==
	Name on the Register	Image	Date listed	Location	City or town	Description
1	John Bridges Tavern and Store Site	John Bridges Tavern and Store Site	May 8, 2017 (#100000962)	Illinois Route 146; 37°26′06″N 89°00′54″W	Buncombe	
2	John Dupont House	John Dupont House	January 19, 2016 (#15000979)	130 W. 5th St. 37°34′38″N 88°46′17″W	New Burnside	
3	Johnson County Courthouse	Johnson County Courthouse	September 9, 2010 (#10000725)	Courthouse Square; 37°24′52″N 88°53′48″W	Vienna	
4	Vienna Public Library	Vienna Public Library	January 24, 1995 (#94001603)	401 Poplar St. 37°24′49″N 88°53′47″W	Vienna	

== Lawrence County ==
	Name on the Register	Image	Date listed	Location	City or town	Description
1	Bridge at 13th Street	Bridge at 13th Street	April 26, 2016 (#16000198)	13th St. between Clark and Johnson Sts. 38°35′34″N 87°39′12″W	St. Francisville	
2	Lawrence County Courthouse	Lawrence County Courthouse	December 7, 2010 (#10000992)	1100 State St. 38°43′46″N 87°40′56″W	Lawrenceville	

== Marshall County ==
	Name on the Register	Image	Date listed	Location	City or town	Description
1	Marshall Site	Marshall Site	August 25, 2014 (#14000508)	Address Restricted	Chillicothe	
2	Robert Waugh House	Robert Waugh House	October 4, 1978 (#78001170)	202 School Street; 41°01′45″N 89°26′24″W	Sparland	

== Mason County ==
	Name on the Register	Image	Date listed	Location	City or town	Description
1	Clear Lake Site		November 28, 1978 (#78001171)	Junction of 1200E and 2600N in Sand Ridge State Park; 40°26′08″N 89°54′00″W	Manito	Extends into Tazewell County
2	Havana Public Library	Havana Public Library	February 16, 1994 (#94000014)	201 W. Adams St. 40°17′57″N 90°03′45″W	Havana	
3	Havana Water Tower	Havana Water Tower	April 22, 1993 (#93000325)	Northeastern corner of the junction of Pearl and Main Sts. 40°18′02″N 90°03′31″W	Havana	
4	Rockwell Mound	Rockwell Mound	December 10, 1987 (#87000679)	Rockwell Park at the northern end of Orange St. 40°18′18″N 90°03′49″W	Havana	

== Massac County ==
	Name on the Register	Image	Date listed	Location	City or town	Description
1	Elijah P. Curtis House	Elijah P. Curtis House	June 9, 1978 (#78001172)	405 Market St. 37°09′04″N 88°44′02″W	Metropolis	
2	Fort Massac Site	Fort Massac Site	July 14, 1971 (#71000293)	Southeast of Metropolis on the Ohio River; 37°08′47″N 88°42′32″W	Metropolis	
3	Kincaid Site	Kincaid Site	October 15, 1966 (#66000326)	Newcut Rd. 37°04′50″N 88°29′31″W	Brookport	Extends into Pope County

=== Former listing ===
	Name on the Register	Image	Date listed	Date removed	Location	City or town	Description
1	R.W. McCartney Music Hall		August 13, 1986 (#86001490)	December 8, 1995	116-120 E. 4th St.	Metropolis	

== Menard County ==
	Name on the Register	Image	Date listed	Location	City or town	Description
1	Lincoln's New Salem Village	Lincoln's New Salem Village	June 19, 1972 (#72000464)	South of Petersburg in New Salem State Park; 39°58′43″N 89°50′42″W	Petersburg	
2	North Sangamon United Presbyterian Church	North Sangamon United Presbyterian Church	March 23, 1979 (#79000858)	North of Athens on Illinois Route 2; 40°00′14″N 89°43′23″W	Athens	
3	Petersburg Historic District	Petersburg Historic District	June 17, 1976 (#76000722)	Illinois Route 97; also the Smoot Hotel at the corner of 6th and Douglas; 40°00′40″N 89°51′00″W	Petersburg	Second set of boundaries represents a boundary increase of January 31, 1986
4	Robinson-Bonnett Inn	Robinson-Bonnett Inn	August 3, 1990 (#90001198)	Whites Crossing Rd., east of Clary Creek; 40°04′31″N 89°59′18″W	Bobtown	
5	Col. Matthew Rogers Building	Col. Matthew Rogers Building	May 22, 2005 (#05000431)	200 S. Main St. 39°57′36″N 89°43′26″W	Athens	

== Moultrie County ==
	Name on the Register	Image	Date listed	Location	City or town	Description
1	Moultrie County Courthouse	Moultrie County Courthouse	April 20, 1995 (#95000489)	10 S. Main St. 39°35′57″N 88°36′25″W	Sullivan	

== Perry County ==
	Name on the Register	Image	Date listed	Location	City or town	Description
1	Du Quoin State Fairgrounds	Du Quoin State Fairgrounds	July 11, 1990 (#90000719)	U.S. Route 51 north of its junction with Illinois Route 14; 37°58′57″N 89°13′37″W	Du Quoin	
2	Paradise Missionary Baptist Church		April 16, 2024 (#100010212)	9023 State Route 154; 38°04′58″N 89°10′54″W	Tamaroa vicinity	
3	Perry County Jail	Perry County Jail	August 10, 2000 (#00000943)	108 W. Jackson St. 38°04′50″N 89°23′01″W	Pinckneyville	

== Piatt County ==
	Name on the Register	Image	Date listed	Location	City or town	Description
1	Robert Allerton Estate	Robert Allerton Estate	July 18, 2007 (#07000701)	515 Old Timber Rd. 40°00′22″N 88°38′49″W	Monticello	
2	Francis E. Bryant House	Francis E. Bryant House	September 5, 2017 (#100001566)	146 E. Wilson St. 39°55′24″N 88°34′19″W	Bement	
3	Monticello Courthouse Square Historic District	Monticello Courthouse Square Historic District	November 5, 2009 (#08000400)	Roughly bounded by Market, the railroad tracks, N. Hamilton, Independence, and Marion Sts. 40°01′30″N 88°34′21″W	Monticello	
4	North State Street Historic District	North State Street Historic District	August 14, 1998 (#98001045)	Roughly along N. State St. from the 300 block to the 1100 block 40°01′51″N 88°34′15″W	Monticello	
5	South Charter Street Historic District	South Charter Street Historic District	January 17, 2002 (#01001464)	Roughly bounded by Marion and S. Market Sts., Sage Dr., and S. State St. 40°01′17″N 88°34′24″W	Monticello	
6	Voorhies Castle	Voorhies Castle	June 20, 1979 (#79000861)	South of Bement; 39°52′00″N 88°34′49″W	Bement	

== Pope County ==
	Name on the Register	Image	Date listed	Location	City or town	Description
1	Golconda Historic District	Golconda Historic District	October 22, 1976 (#76000726)	Illinois Route 146; 37°22′00″N 88°29′04″W	Golconda	
2	Kincaid Site	Kincaid Site	October 15, 1966 (#66000326)	Newcut Rd. 37°04′53″N 88°29′22″W	Brookport	Extends into Massac County
3	Miller Grove Archaeological Historic District		July 28, 2026 (#100013247)	Address Restricted	Glendale vicinity	
4	Millstone Bluff	Millstone Bluff	October 15, 1973 (#73000716)	Illinois Route 147 west of its junction with Illinois Route 145; 37°28′01″N 88°41′17″W	Glendale	

== Pulaski County ==
	Name on the Register	Image	Date listed	Location	City or town	Description
1	Illinois Central Railroad Depot	Illinois Central Railroad Depot	August 18, 1999 (#99000978)	Junction of Central Avenue and Ullin Avenue; 37°16′38″N 89°11′05″W	Ullin	
2	Mound City Civil War Naval Hospital	Mound City Civil War Naval Hospital	October 9, 1974 (#74002285)	Commercial Avenue and Central Street; 37°05′04″N 89°09′39″W	Mound City	Destroyed by fire in 1976
3	Mound City National Cemetery	Mound City National Cemetery	October 8, 1997 (#97001174)	Junction of U.S. Route 51 and Illinois Route 37; 37°05′14″N 89°10′41″W	Mound City	
4	Olmstead Depot	Olmstead Depot	December 15, 1989 (#89002101)	Front Street and Caledonia Avenue; 37°10′52″N 89°05′20″W	Olmsted	

== Putnam County ==
	Name on the Register	Image	Date listed	Location	City or town	Description
1	Clear Creek Meeting House	Clear Creek Meeting House	November 5, 1992 (#92001534)	14365 North 350th Avenue; 41°09′16″N 89°11′36″W	McNabb	
2	Cortland Condit House	Cortland Condit House	September 16, 1983 (#83000335)	Off Illinois Route 29; 41°10′53″N 89°23′46″W	Putnam	
3	Edward Pulsifer House	Edward Pulsifer House	September 4, 1979 (#79000864)	Illinois Route 71; 41°15′27″N 89°20′27″W	Hennepin	
4	Putnam County Courthouse	Putnam County Courthouse	March 4, 1975 (#75000672)	4th St. 41°15′12″N 89°20′33″W	Hennepin	

== Richland County ==
	Name on the Register	Image	Date listed	Location	City or town	Description
1	Elliott Street Historic District	Elliott Street Historic District	November 26, 1980 (#80001405)	S. Elliott Street between Chestnut Street and South Avenue; 38°43′32″N 88°04′48″W	Olney	
2	Ambrose Hopkinson House	Ambrose Hopkinson House	February 9, 2001 (#01000083)	122 W. Elm St. 38°43′44″N 88°05′09″W	Olney	
3	Larchmound	Larchmound	January 3, 1980 (#80001406)	1030 S. Morgan St. 38°43′11″N 88°04′53″W	Olney	
4	Olney Carnegie Library	Olney Carnegie Library	February 14, 2002 (#02000037)	401 E. Main St. 38°43′51″N 88°04′57″W	Olney	

== Saline County ==
	Name on the Register	Image	Date listed	Location	City or town	Description
1	Carrier Mills Archeological District	Carrier Mills Archeological District	August 25, 1978 (#78001184)	Along the Saline River south of Carrier Mills; 37°39′28″N 88°37′04″W	Carrier Mills	
2	Eldorado City Hall	Eldorado City Hall	November 7, 1995 (#95001237)	1604 Locust St. 37°48′45″N 88°26′31″W	Eldorado	
3	Harrisburg City Hall	Harrisburg City Hall	November 12, 1998 (#98001356)	110 E. Locust St. 37°44′22″N 88°32′20″W	Harrisburg	
4	Saline County Poor Farm	Saline County Poor Farm	January 22, 2001 (#00001048)	1600 Feazel Rd. 37°43′08″N 88°33′08″W	Harrisburg	

== Schuyler County ==
	Name on the Register	Image	Date listed	Location	City or town	Description
1	Phoenix Opera House Block	Phoenix Opera House Block	May 9, 1985 (#85001010)	112-122 W. Lafayette St. 40°07′14″N 90°33′47″W	Rushville	
2	White Oak Hall	White Oak Hall	February 5, 2003 (#02001757)	Southeastern corner of the junction of White Oak and Lower Beardstown Rds. 40°06′32″N 90°31′09″W	Rushville	

== Scott County ==
	Name on the Register	Image	Date listed	Location	City or town	Description
1	Naples Archeological District		December 22, 1979 (#79000869)	Eastern bank of the Illinois River south of Naples; 39°44′18″N 90°37′06″W	Naples	
2	Winchester Historic District	Winchester Historic District	February 14, 1979 (#79000870)	Illinois Route 106; 39°37′44″N 90°27′19″W	Winchester	

== Shelby County ==
	Name on the Register	Image	Date listed	Location	City or town	Description
1	Chautauqua Auditorium	Chautauqua Auditorium	January 30, 1978 (#78001190)	Forest Park and NE. 9th St. 39°25′05″N 88°47′26″W	Shelbyville	
2	Clarksburg Schoolhouse	Clarksburg Schoolhouse	January 25, 2001 (#00000952)	Clarksburg Rd., 1 mile east of the junction of County Roads 800N and 2025E; 39°19′56″N 88°44′59″W	Clarksburg	
3	Shelbyville Historic District	Shelbyville Historic District	December 22, 1976 (#76000729)	Roughly bounded by the railroad tracks and Will, N. 8th, and S. 6th Sts. 39°24′30″N 88°47′41″W	Shelbyville	
4	Horace M. Tallman House	Horace M. Tallman House	May 6, 1988 (#88000470)	816 W. Main; 39°24′23″N 88°48′11″W	Shelbyville	
5	Thompson Mill Covered Bridge	Thompson Mill Covered Bridge	March 13, 1975 (#75000675)	0.5 miles northeast of Cowden over the Kaskaskia River; 39°15′31″N 88°49′05″W	Cowden	
6	Westervelt Christian Church	Westervelt Christian Church	February 9, 2006 (#06000009)	103 W. Main St. 39°28′45″N 88°51′35″W	Westervelt	

== Stark County ==
	Name on the Register	Image	Date listed	Location	City or town	Description
1	Chicago, Burlington & Quincy Railroad Depot	Chicago, Burlington & Quincy Railroad Depot	April 30, 1987 (#87000650)	Williams St. 41°03′41″N 89°46′07″W	Wyoming	
2	Dr. Thomas Hall's Office		September 2, 2025 (#100012169)	318 West Jefferson St. 41°05′34″N 89°52′04″W	Toulon	
3	Osceola Grove Community House		May 26, 2026 (#100013064)	1130 E. Bradford; 41°10′41″N 89°45′59″W	Bradford	

== Wabash County ==
	Name on the Register	Image	Date listed	Location	City or town	Description
1	Beall-Orr House	Beall-Orr House	February 4, 1994 (#94000028)	503 Cherry St. 38°24′43″N 87°45′30″W	Mt. Carmel	

== Washington County ==
	Name on the Register	Image	Date listed	Location	City or town	Description
1	Louisville and Nashville Depot	Louisville and Nashville Depot	March 1, 1985 (#85000496)	101 E. Railroad St. 38°20′54″N 89°22′57″W	Nashville	
2	Original Springs Hotel and Bathhouse	Original Springs Hotel and Bathhouse	December 22, 1978 (#78001194)	506 N. Hanover St. 38°26′03″N 89°32′55″W	Okawville	
3	Frank Schlosser Complex	Frank Schlosser Complex	August 15, 1983 (#83000337)	W. Walnut St. 38°26′03″N 89°33′06″W	Okawville	

== Wayne County ==
	Name on the Register	Image	Date listed	Location	City or town	Description
1	G.J. George House	G.J. George House	February 9, 2006 (#06000006)	205 W. Center; 38°22′40″N 88°21′46″W	Fairfield	
2	Mayberry Mound and Village Site	Mayberry Mound and Village Site	November 21, 1978 (#78001195)	Northeast of the junction of County Road 900E and the Skillet Fork; 38°19′15″N 88°31′30″W	Sims	
3	Turney-Hall House	Turney-Hall House	April 19, 2018 (#100002329)	502 SE 4th St. 38°22′30″N 88°21′24″W	Fairfield	

== Williamson County ==
	Name on the Register	Image	Date listed	Location	City or town	Description
1	Willis Allen House	Willis Allen House	February 11, 1982 (#82002606)	514 S. Market St. 37°43′41″N 88°55′39″W	Marion	
2	Goddard Chapel	Goddard Chapel	November 6, 1986 (#86003157)	Rose Hill Cemetery; 37°44′35″N 88°55′54″W	Marion	
3	Marion Veterans Administration Hospital Historic District	Marion Veterans Administration Hospital Historic District	January 9, 2013 (#12001146)	2401 W. Main St. 37°43′28″N 88°57′17″W	Marion	
4	Ed M. Stotlar House	Ed M. Stotlar House	November 21, 2002 (#02001354)	1304 W. Main St. 37°43′52″N 88°56′23″W	Marion	
5	Williamson County Jail	Williamson County Jail	May 30, 2007 (#07000476)	105 S. Van Buren St. 37°43′49″N 88°55′41″W	Marion	

== See also ==
- List of National Historic Landmarks in Illinois
- List of NRHP Multiple Property Submissions in Illinois
- List of archaeological sites on the National Register of Historic Places in Illinois
- List of bridges on the National Register of Historic Places in Illinois
- List of historical societies in Illinois
- United States National Register of Historic Places listings
