= Tallman House =

Tallman House may refer to:

in the United States

(by state then town)

- Horace M. Tallman House, Shelbyville, Illinois, listed on the NRHP in Shelby County
- Tallman–Vanderbeck House, Closter, New Jersey, listed on the NRHP in Bergen County, New Jersey
- Holmes–Tallman House, Monroe Township, New Jersey, listed on the NRHP in Middlesex County
- MacGregor–Tallman House, West Long Branch, New Jersey, listed on the NRHP in Monmouth County
- Lincoln–Tallman House, Janesville, Wisconsin, listed on the NRHP in Rock County
