= Paxton First Schoolhouse =

- U.S. National Register of Historic Places
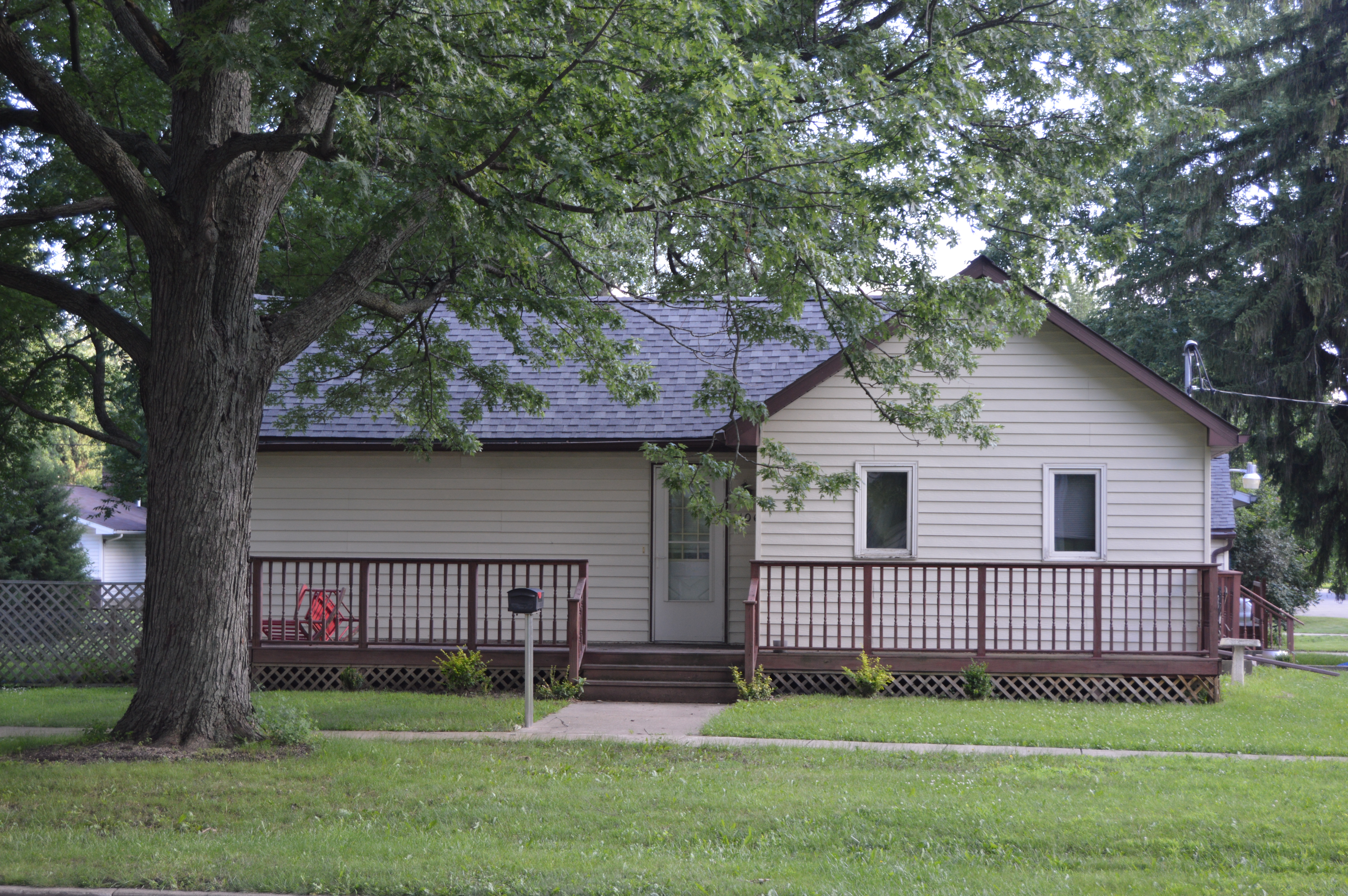
- House on the site of the school building

- Location within Illinois Location within the United States
- Location: 406 E. Franklin St., Paxton, Illinois
- Coordinates: 40°27′17.5″N 88°5′39″W
- Area: Less than 1 acre (0.40 ha)
- Built: 1856
- NRHP reference No.: 80001354
- Added to NRHP: January 29, 1980

The Paxton First Schoolhouse, located at 406 E. Franklin St., is the oldest remaining building in Paxton, Illinois. Built in 1856-57, the building served as the first school in Paxton. It was also used as a church and a meeting hall by many of Paxton's early settlers. The school moved to a new building in the 1860s, and the First Schoolhouse became a private residence.

The school was added to the National Register of Historic Places on January 29, 1980. It is one of four sites on the National Register in Paxton and one of five in Ford County.
