= Clarksburg Schoolhouse =

Historic building in Illinois, U.S.

- U.S. National Register of Historic Places
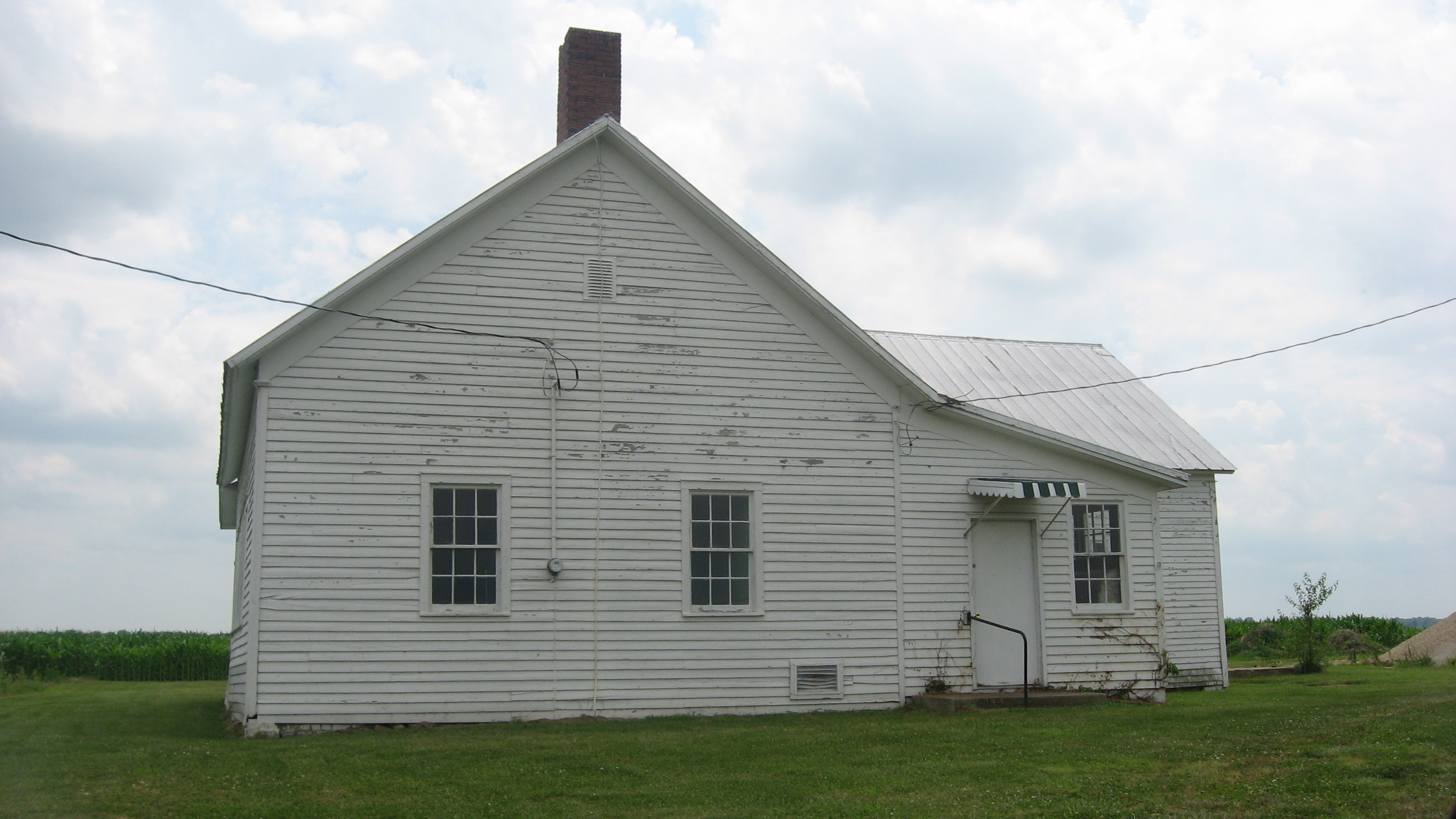

- Location within Illinois Location within the United States
- Location: Clarksburg Rd. 1 mi. E of Cty Rd. 800 N/2025 E, Clarksburg, Illinois
- Coordinates: 39°19′56″N 88°44′59″W
- Area: 1 acre (0.40 ha)
- NRHP reference No.: 00000952
- Added to NRHP: January 25, 2001

The Clarksburg Schoolhouse was a historic school building located on Clarksburg Road in Clarksburg, Illinois. The school opened circa 1892 and was originally known as Bethel School; it changed its name following the growth of Clarksburg in the ensuing years. The school served as Clarksburg's public primary school for children in the first through eighth grades; students from the school continued their education at Shelbyville's high school. After the school merged into Shelbyville's district in the 1960s, the building became a community center for Clarksburg Township; it served in this capacity until 1998. The building was the only surviving community schoolhouse in the area.

The schoolhouse was added to the National Register of Historic Places on January 25, 2001.

The schoolhouse was demolished and burned by arsonist's without notice in March 2018. See photos from July 2017 and photos of it burning in March 2018 here: http://edgarcountywatchdogs.com/2018/03/illinois-last-known-two-room-wooden-schoolhouse-goes-up-in-flames/
