= White Oak Hall =

- U.S. National Register of Historic Places
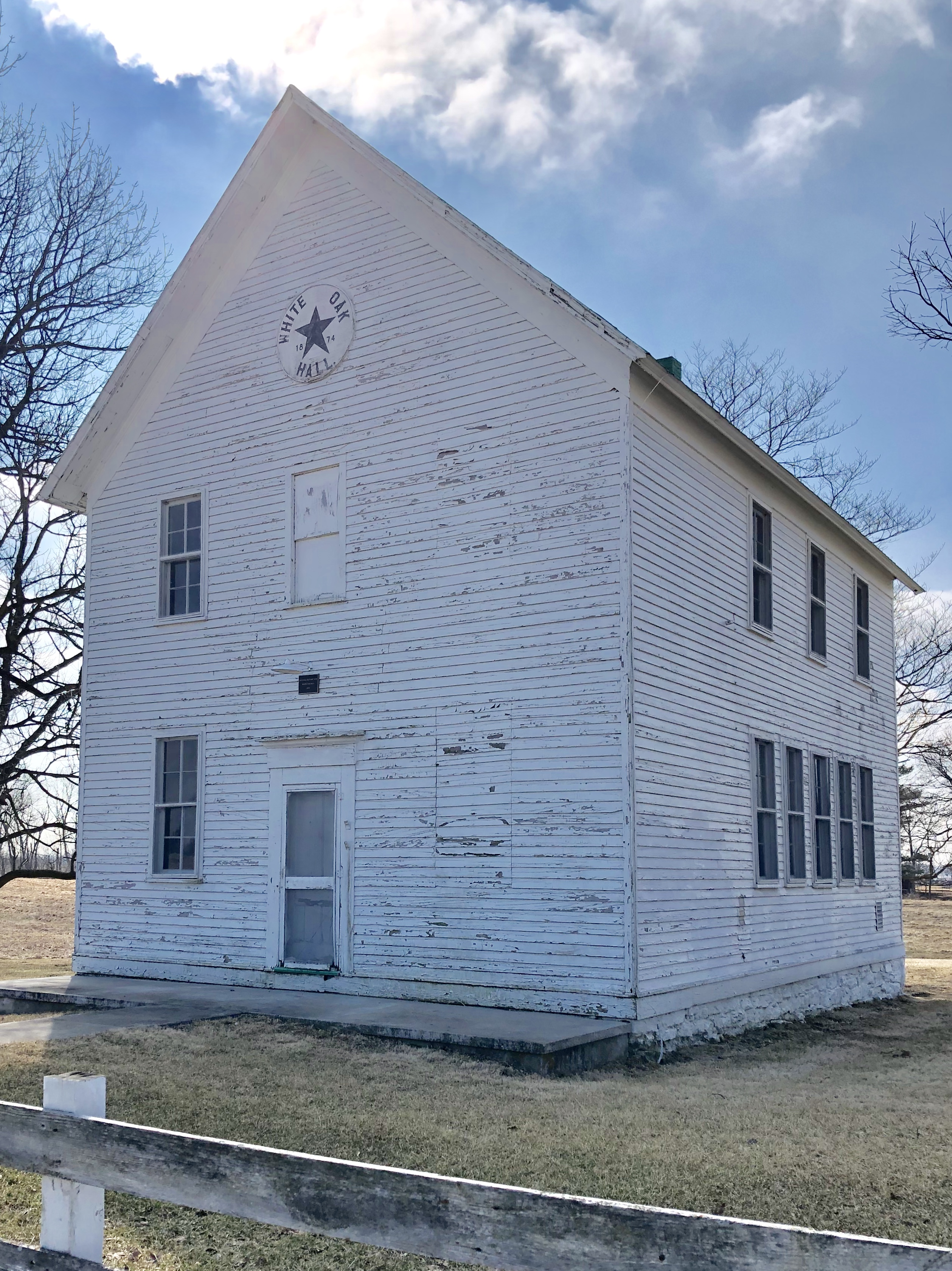

- Location within Illinois Location within the United States
- Nearest city: Rushville, Illinois
- Coordinates: 40°6′32″N 90°31′9″W
- Area: 0.6 acres (0.24 ha)
- Built: 1874
- Architectural style: Two-story schoolhouse
- NRHP reference No.: 02001757
- Added to NRHP: February 5, 2003

White Oak Hall, also known as White Oak School, is a historic building located near Rushville, Illinois, United States. The two-story school was built in 1874. The first floor of the building held the schoolroom, while the second floor was used as a meeting hall by the local chapter of The Grange. The Grange Hall also housed the White Oak Literary Society, church services, Sunday school classes, and social functions. The school operated until 1960, while the second floor was used for events through the 1990s. The school is one of the only rural one-room schoolhouses remaining in Schuyler County.

The school was added to the National Register of Historic Places on February 5, 2003.
