= Henson House =

Historic house in Illinois, United States

- U.S. National Register of Historic Places
- Location within Illinois Location within the United States
- Location: 103 N. Henson Rd., Villa Grove, Illinois
- Coordinates: 39°51′48″N 88°09′03″W
- Built: 1871
- Architectural style: Italianate, Neoclassical, Arts and Crafts
- NRHP reference No.: 100005967
- Added to NRHP: December 31, 2020

The Henson House is a historic house at 103 N. Henson Road in Villa Grove, Illinois. The house was built in 1871 for George W. Henson, a local landowner and a major figure in Villa Grove's establishment. The Henson House was the first house in the Villa Grove area, and Henson sold the city's original site to the Chicago & Eastern Illinois Railroad when it built a line through the area; even the city's name came from a nickname for the Henson House, "the villa in the grove". The house originally had an Italianate design, which can still be seen in its projecting bay window and its tall arched windows. Later redesigns of the house introduced elements of the Neoclassical style, such as the columns and pediment on its front porch, and the Arts and Crafts style, such as the wooden front doors.

The house was added to the National Register of Historic Places on December 31, 2020.
