= Phoenix Opera House Block =

- U.S. National Register of Historic Places
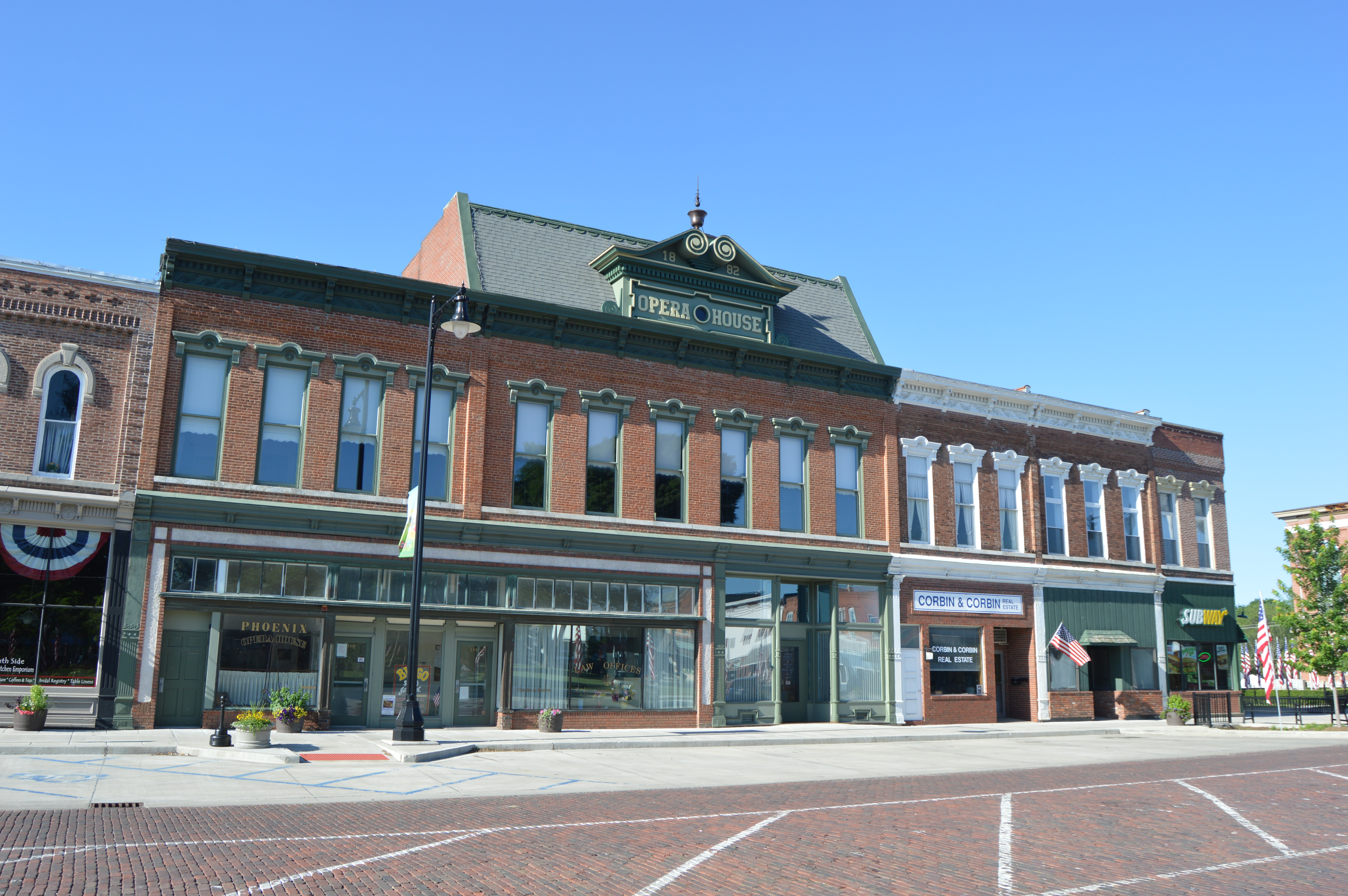
- Northern front of the block

- Location within Illinois Location within the United States
- Location: 112-122 W. Lafayette St., Rushville, Illinois
- Coordinates: 40°7′13″N 90°33′46″W
- Area: less than one acre
- Built: 1882
- Architect: Wilson, Thos.; Wells, Charles H. & Lewis C.
- NRHP reference No.: 85001010
- Added to NRHP: May 9, 1985

The Phoenix Opera House Block is a historic building in Rushville, Illinois. Built in 1882, the building housed commercial businesses on the first floor and an opera house on the second floor. The opera house hosted traveling performers and theater companies as well as local social events. The opera house closed in 1910, as churches began to host the town's social functions and the local movie theater provided entertainment. From 1924 to 1956, the opera house served as a Masonic lodge. The building is one of the few surviving examples of a combined opera house and commercial building.

The building was added to the National Register of Historic Places on May 9, 1985.
