= Turney-Hall House =

Historic house in Illinois, United States

- U.S. National Register of Historic Places
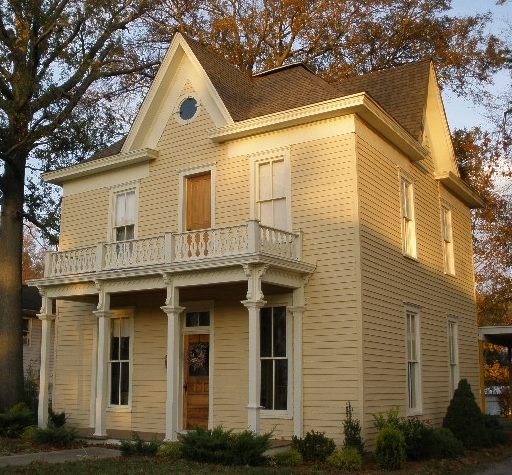

- Location within Illinois Location within the United States
- Location: 502 SE 4th St., Fairfield, Illinois
- Coordinates: 38°22′40″N 88°21′46″W
- Built: c. 1870
- Architectural style: Italianate, Folk Victorian
- NRHP reference No.: 100002329
- Added to NRHP: April 19, 2018

The Turney-Hall House is a historic house in Fairfield, Illinois. Built circa 1875, the house's design combines elements of the Italianate and Folk Victorian styles. The house has a balloon frame with a two-story Italianate form. Its roof has both an Italianate hipped shape and tall gables typical of Folk Victorian designs, though the wide eaves and the band board running below them are Italianate. The house's porch and balcony reflect both styles, but its ornamental features are generally confined to the porch, a characteristic Folk Victorian feature. While wood frame Italianate homes were popular in the late 19th century, the house is among the last of its type remaining in Fairfield and is the only one without modern siding.

The house was added to the National Register of Historic Places on April 19, 2018, as the House at 502 SE 4th St. The listing was updated with a new name in 2020.
