= John Bridges Tavern and Store Site =

- U.S. National Register of Historic Places
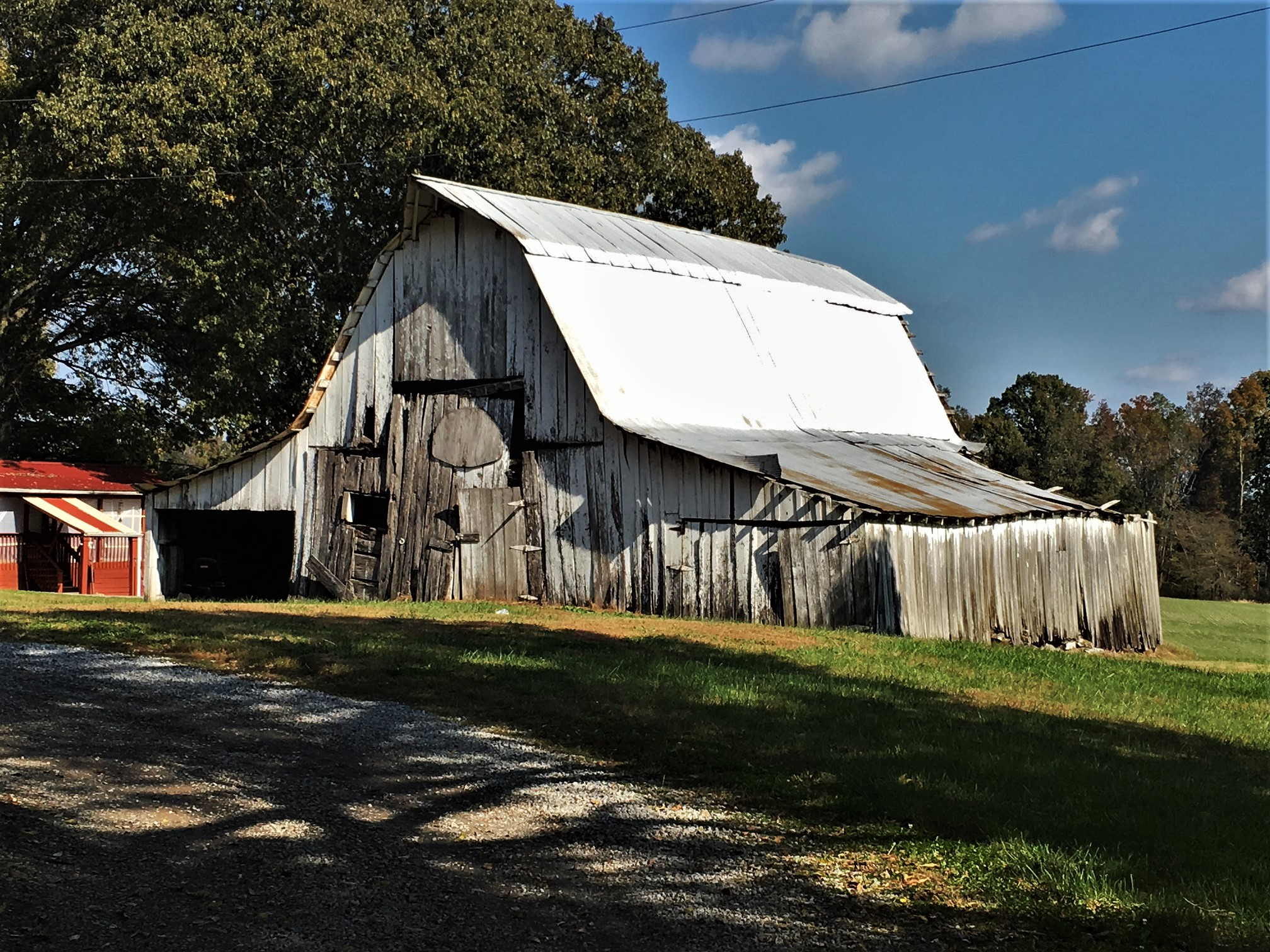
- A nineteenth-century log outbuilding known as the "Wayside Store" is encased within this c. 1940 barn

- Location within Illinois Location within the United States
- Location: Illinois Route 146, Buncombe, Illinois
- Coordinates: 37°26′06″N 89°00′54″W
- NRHP reference No.: 100000962
- Added to NRHP: May 8, 2017

The John Bridges Tavern and Store Site is a historic tavern complex site located along Illinois Route 146 near Buncombe, Illinois. The tavern and store were built in the early 1830s by either John Bridges, Sr., or his son John Bridges, Jr. In 1838 and 1839, the Trail of Tears passed through southern Illinois, and the tavern and store served as a stopping place for Cherokee who had been removed from their homeland. Additionally, a spring on the property provided a water source for the Cherokee and their animals. The tavern burned down in 1940, and the complex has been partially demolished, but some remains of the store still stand and archaeological investigations have been conducted at the site.

The site was added to the National Register of Historic Places on May 8, 2017.
