= Greenup Commercial Historic District =

Historic district in Illinois, United States

- U.S. National Register of Historic Places
- U.S. Historic district
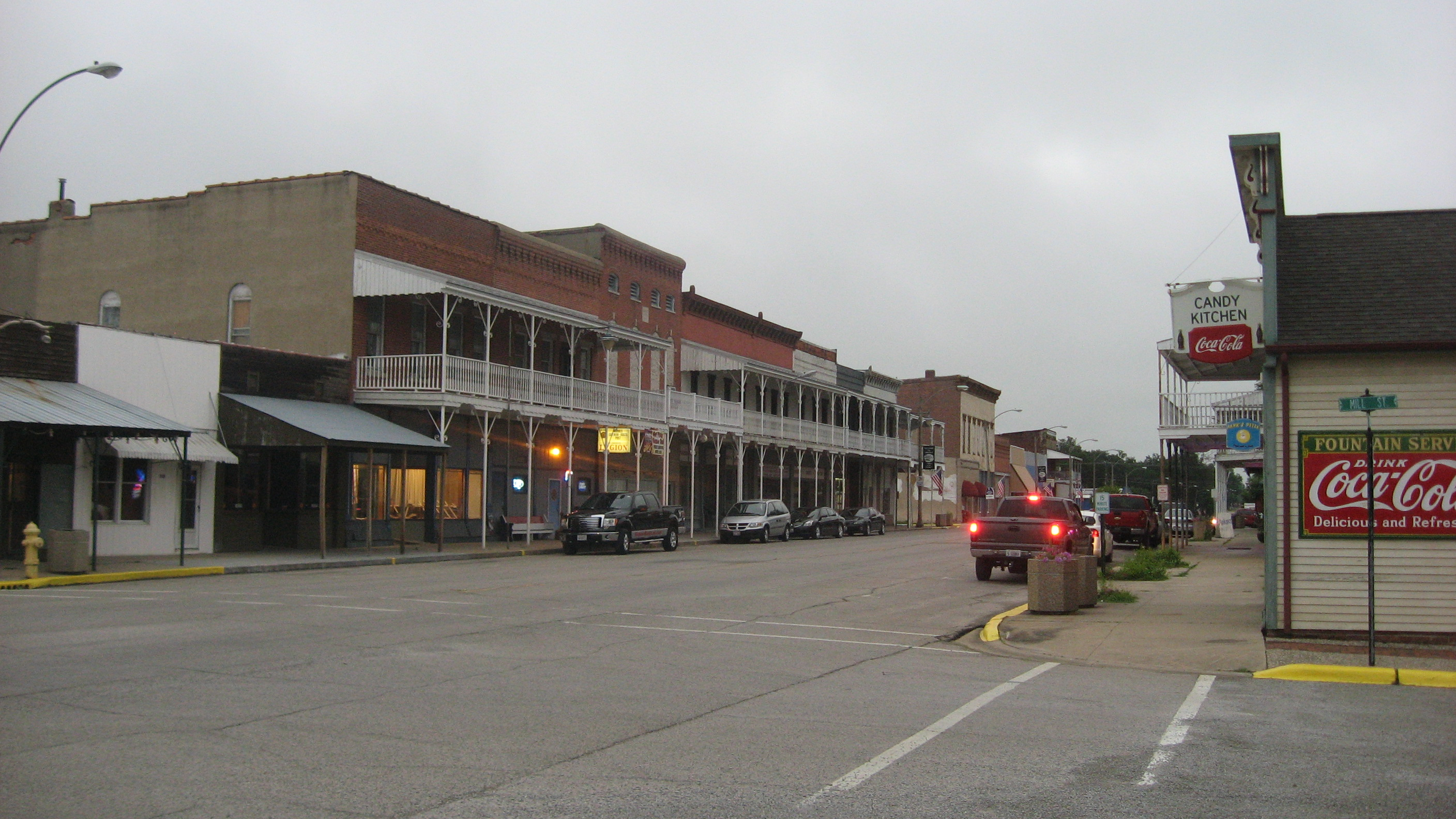
- Cumberland east from Mill, downtown

- Location within Illinois Location within the United States
- Location: Greenup, Cumberland County, Illinois, USA
- Coordinates: 39°14′50″N 88°9′44″W
- Area: 6.1 acres (2.5 ha)
- Built: 1927
- Architect: Various
- NRHP reference No.: 91000083
- Added to NRHP: February 21, 1991

The Greenup Commercial Historic District is a historic district located in the business district of Greenup, Illinois. The district includes 40 buildings, of which 31 are considered contributing buildings to the district's historic character. It was added to the National Register of Historic Places on February 21, 1991.

Several of the businesses in the district feature overhanging porches on their front facades, lending Greenup the nickname "Village of Porches". The district includes Greenup's Carnegie library, which now houses the Cumberland County Military Museum. The Johnson Building, a commercial building and hotel constructed in 1895, is also located within the district; the building now serves as the Cumberland County Historical and Genealogical Museum.
