= St. John's Episcopal Church (Albion, Illinois) =

Historic church in Illinois, United States

- U.S. National Register of Historic Places
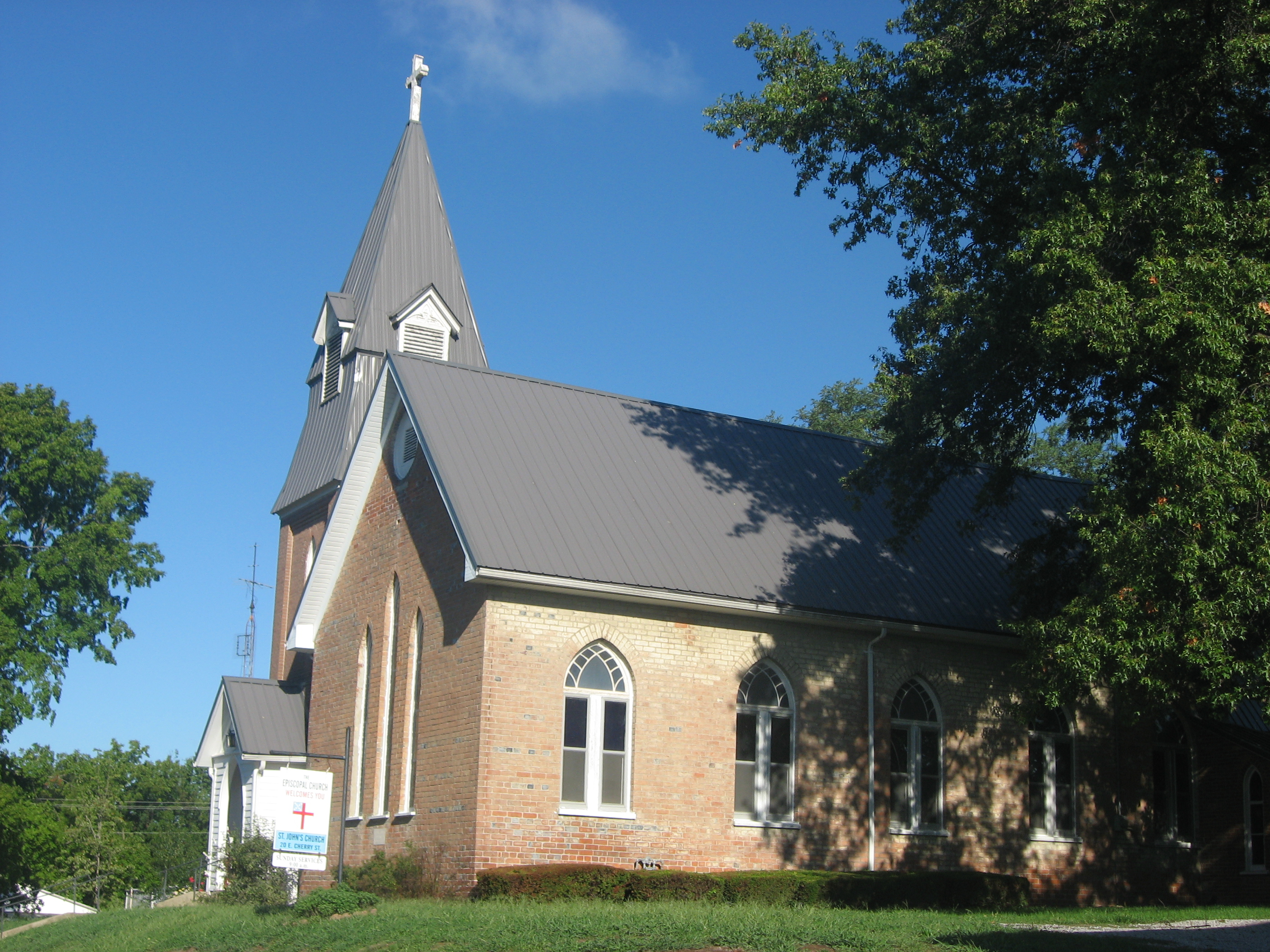

- Location within Illinois Location within the United States
- Location: 20 E. Cherry St., Albion, Illinois
- Coordinates: 38°22′32″N 88°3′27″W
- Built: 1842-43
- NRHP reference No.: 12000027
- Added to NRHP: February 15, 2012

St. John's Episcopal Church is an Episcopal church located at 20 E. Cherry St. in Albion, Illinois, in the Diocese of Springfield. It is the oldest surviving Episcopal church in the state, in regular use since Christmas 1842, and celebrated its 175th anniversary in 2018.

The church was built in 1842–43 and has held regular services continuously since its opening. Albion's Episcopal congregation, established in 1819, was the first Protestant church in the city; it met in a log cabin prior to the construction of the church. The church was built from red brick with a foundation of locally quarried stone. In 1879–80, the church was expanded to accommodate its increasing congregation; its bell tower was most likely added around this time. The pump organ dates to 1881.

The church was added to the National Register of Historic Places on February 15, 2012.
