= North Sangamon United Presbyterian Church =

Historic church in Illinois, United States

- U.S. National Register of Historic Places
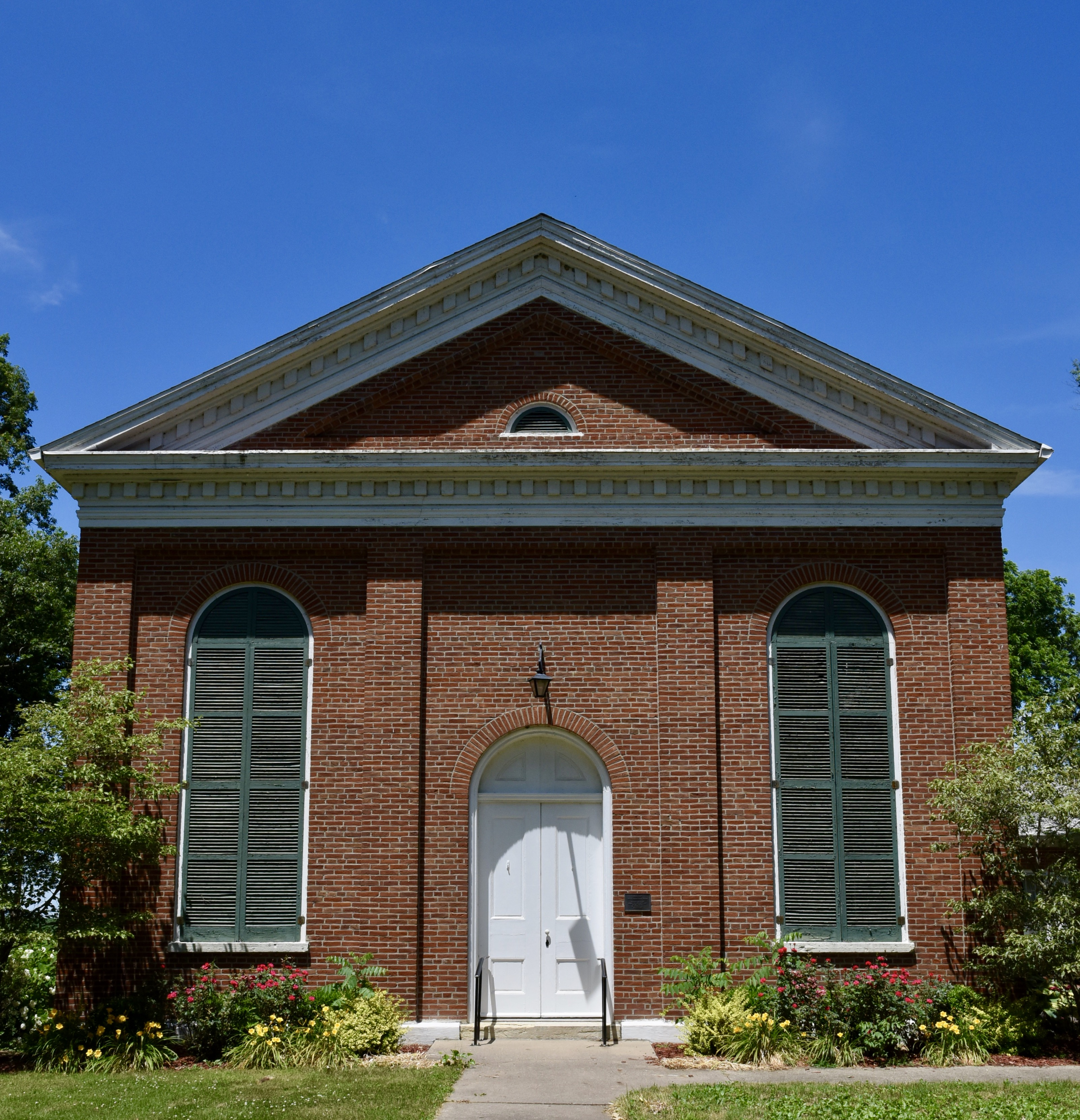

- Location within Illinois Location within the United States
- Nearest city: Athens, Illinois
- Coordinates: 40°0′14″N 89°43′23″W
- Area: 3 acres (1.2 ha)
- Built: 1860–62
- Built by: Thatcher, Charles
- Architectural style: Georgian
- NRHP reference No.: 79000858
- Added to NRHP: March 23, 1979

North Sangamon United Presbyterian Church (also known as Indian Point United Presbyterian Church) is a historic Presbyterian church building in Athens, Illinois. The building was constructed between 1860 and 1862 in a Georgian style. While the Georgian style had largely fallen out of favor by 1860, the church is nonetheless considered a good example of the style and features elements such as a steeply pitched pediment with a half-circle vent and fan-shaped decorations. The church housed a Presbyterian congregation which formed in 1832 and ultimately spawned three other congregations in Menard County. In addition, the church also sponsored a local school.

The church was added to the National Register of Historic Places in 1979.
