= Ed M. Stotlar House =

Historic house in Illinois, United States

- U.S. National Register of Historic Places
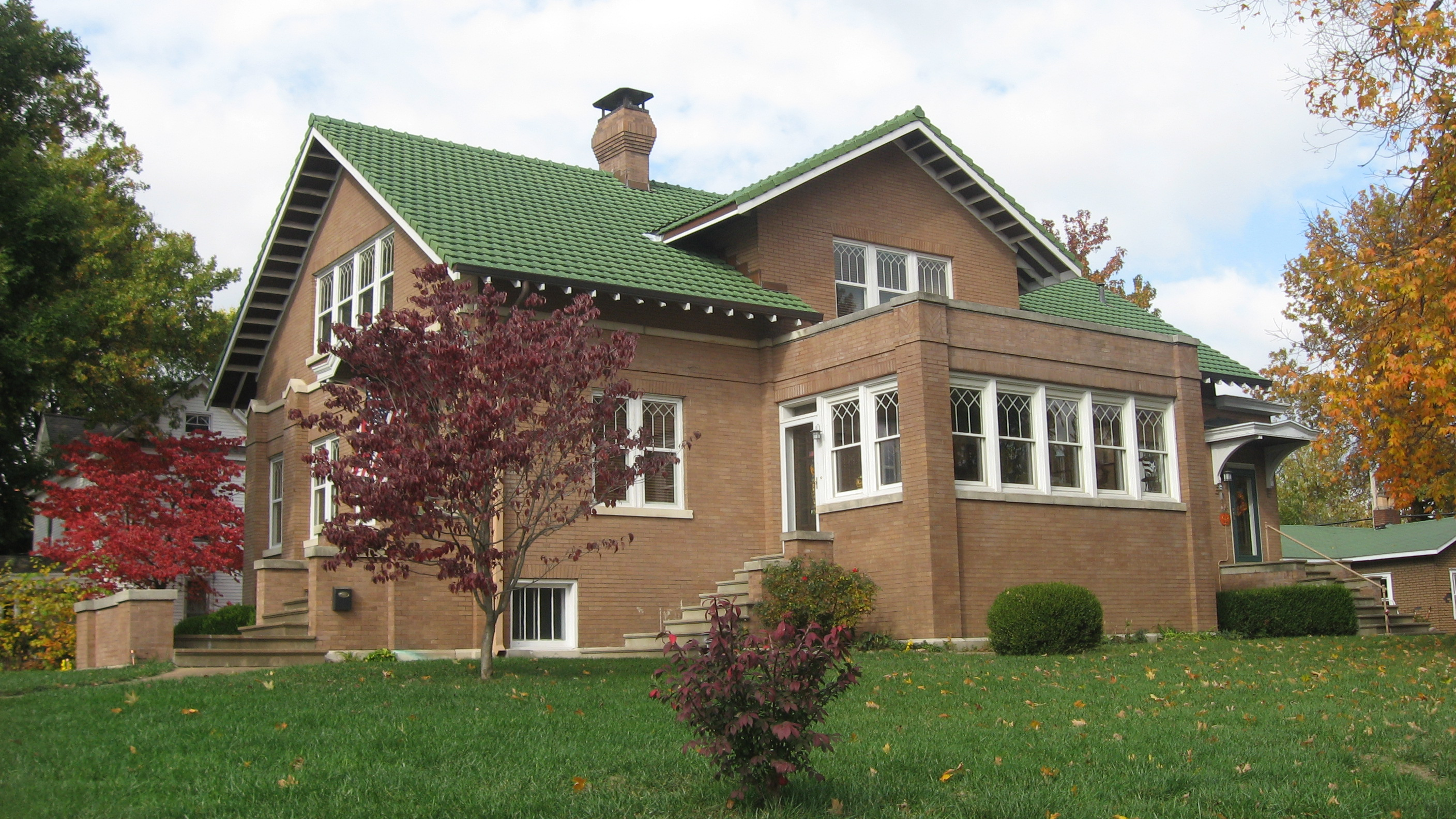

- Location within Illinois Location within the United States
- Location: 1304 W. Main St., Marion, Illinois
- Coordinates: 37°43′58″N 88°56′23″W
- Area: 0.5 acres (0.20 ha)
- Built: 1914-15
- Architect: Ashby, George William
- Architectural style: Craftsman, Prairie School
- NRHP reference No.: 02001354
- Added to NRHP: November 21, 2002

The Ed M. Stotlar House is a historic house located at 1304 W. Main St. in Marion, Illinois. The house was built in 1914-15 for Southern Illinois lumber salesman Ed M. Stotlar and his family. Stotlar was also the longtime president of the Marion Library Board and a prominent art and book collector. Architect George William Ashby designed the home in a blend of the American Craftsman and Prairie School styles. The house features connected double-hung windows and a gable roof with overhanging eaves and exposed rafter tails, characteristic features of the Craftsman style. Its Prairie School influences include its art glass windows and horizontal ribbons of brick near the top of the first floor.

The house was added to the National Register of Historic Places on November 21, 2002.
