= Beall-Orr House =

Historic house in Illinois, United States

- U.S. National Register of Historic Places
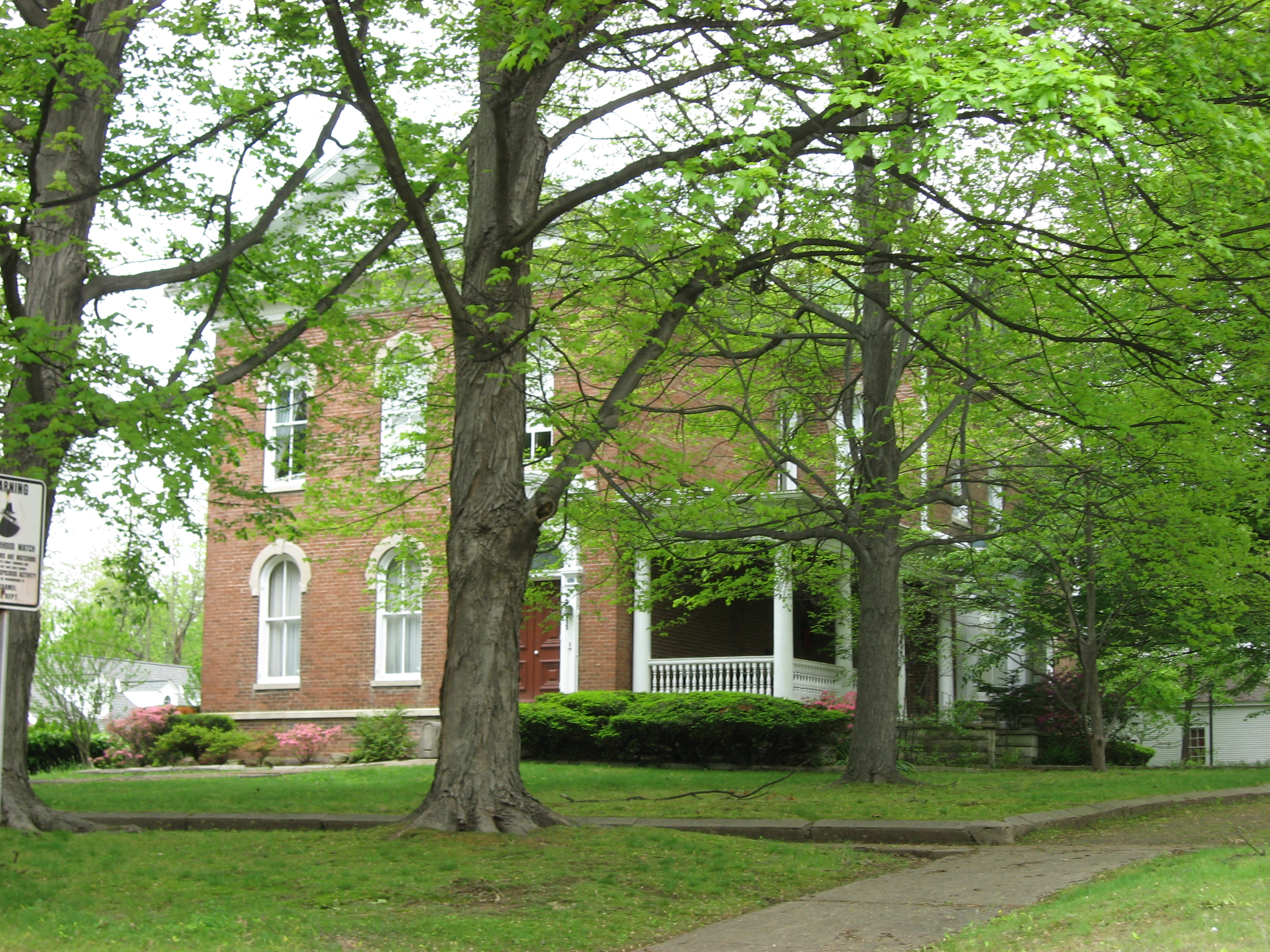
- Front and side of the house

- Location within Illinois Location within the United States
- Location: 503 Cherry St., Mount Carmel, Illinois
- Coordinates: 38°24′43″N 87°45′30″W
- Area: Less than 1 acre (0.40 ha)
- Architectural style: Italianate, Neoclassical
- NRHP reference No.: 94000028
- Added to NRHP: February 4, 1994

The Beall-Orr House is a historic house located at 503 Cherry St. in Mount Carmel, Illinois.

== Architecture ==
Built circa 1870, the house was designed in a combination of the Italianate and Classical Revival styles. The two-story house features a low-pitched hip roof with an extensively ornamented bracketed cornice and frieze. The home's front entrance is elaborately decorated, and the house's tall, narrow arched windows are topped with stone lintels. The Classical Revival front porch is supported by Tuscan columns. The three gable ends of the house have fan-shaped windows, another feature of Classical Revival design.

== History ==
The house was originally occupied by Mary J. and Edward F. Beall, members of Mount Carmel's wealthy Beall family. In 1908, Judith Keneipp Orr purchased the house. Orr added the home's Classical Revival elements during repair work after a 1918 fire. Orr's daughter married Dr. Harold A. Elkins, a prominent local physician who ran his practice from the house. After Elkins's death, his daughter Judith occupied the house until her 1991 death.

The house was added to the National Register of Historic Places on February 4, 1994.
