= John Dupont House =

Historic house in Illinois, United States

- U.S. National Register of Historic Places
- Location within Illinois Location within the United States
- Location: 130 W. 5th St., New Burnside, Illinois
- Coordinates: 37°34′38″N 88°46′16.5″W
- Built: 1872
- Built by: John Dupont
- Architectural style: Italianate, Gothic Revival
- NRHP reference No.: 15000979
- Added to NRHP: January 19, 2016

The John Dupont House is a historic house located at 130 West 5th Street in New Burnside, Illinois. John Dupont, an early settler of New Burnside who later became Johnson County Commissioner, built the house in 1872. Dupont's tenure as commissioner was noted for his efforts to combat the Ku Klux Klan and his support for new laws banning alcohol sales in the county. The two-story house has an Italianate design with some Gothic Revival features. The house was built to a cruciform plan and features porches with moldings, bracket (architecture)ing, and chamfered posts as well as tall, arched windows on the first and second floors. The gable windows have trefoil designs, a common Gothic feature. Both floors of the house have 11-foot (3.4 m) high ceilings.

The house was added to the National Register of Historic Places on January 19, 2016.
