= A. Herr and E. E. Smith Public Library =

- U.S. National Register of Historic Places
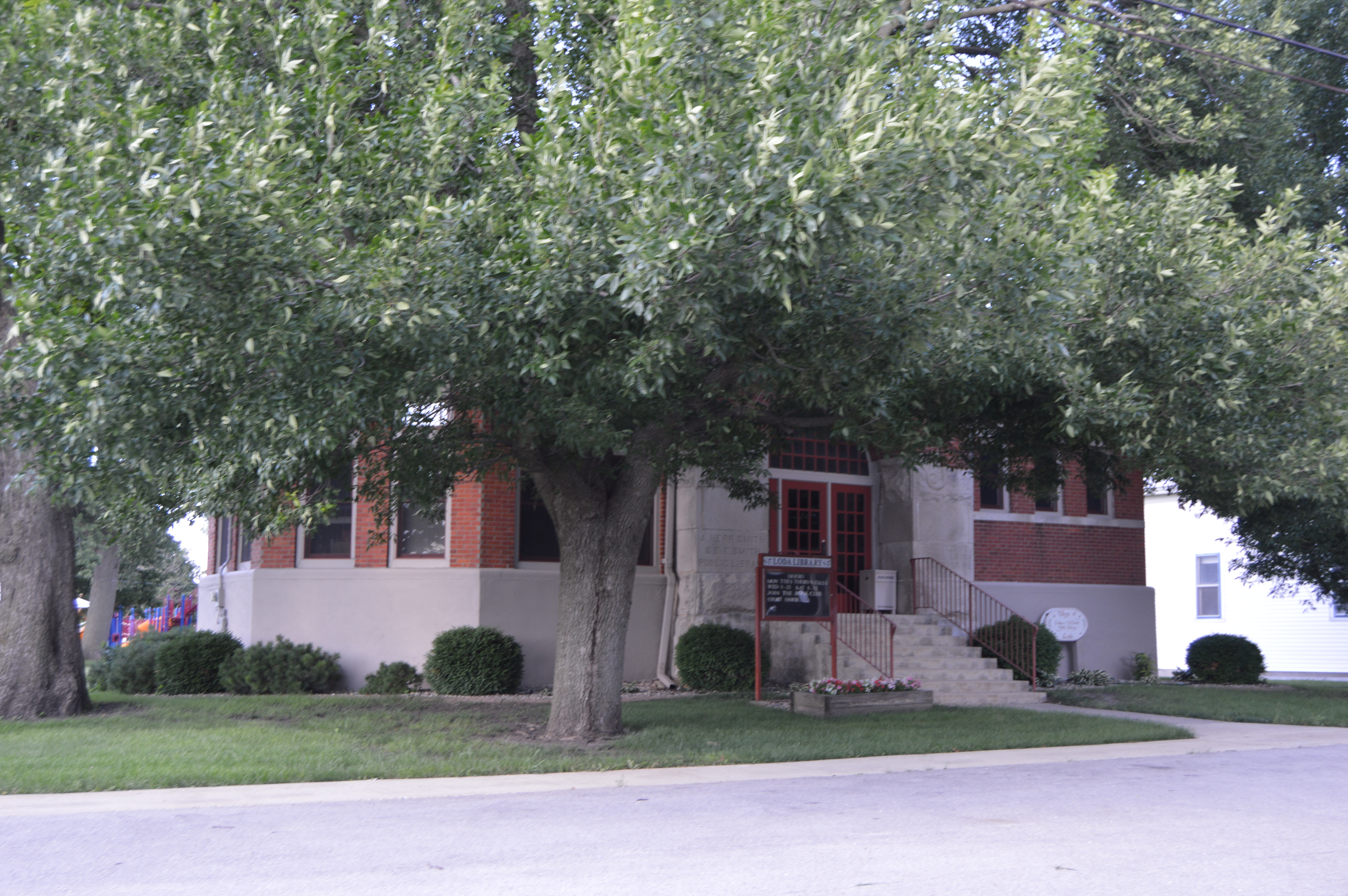

- Location within Illinois Location within the United States
- Location: 105 Adams St., Loda, Illinois
- Coordinates: 40°31′4″N 88°4′14″W
- Area: less than one acre
- Built: 1897
- Built by: King, Fred E.
- Architect: Moratz, Paul O.
- Architectural style: Romanesque
- NRHP reference No.: 95000992
- Added to NRHP: August 4, 1995

The A. Herr and E. E. Smith Public Library is a historic public library located at 105 Adams Street in Loda, Illinois. The library's origins date back to 1858, when the Loda Literary Society was formed. The society originally had no permanent site for its book collection, and it traveled through several town buildings before the society formed a committee to establish a permanent library in 1894. A new library was funded through a gift from Eliza E. Smith, a Pennsylvanian and the sister and heir of A. Herr Smith; A. Herr Smith had business interests in Loda and had grown fond of the area. The library was incorporated in 1896, and construction on the new library building was completed in 1897. In addition to housing the town's book collection, the library also held books for the local public school and served as the Loda Historical Society's archives and the Oakalla Culture Club's meeting room.

The library was added to the National Register of Historic Places on August 4, 1995.
