= Prairie Dell Meetinghouse =

Historic meetinghouse in Illinois, United States

- U.S. National Register of Historic Places
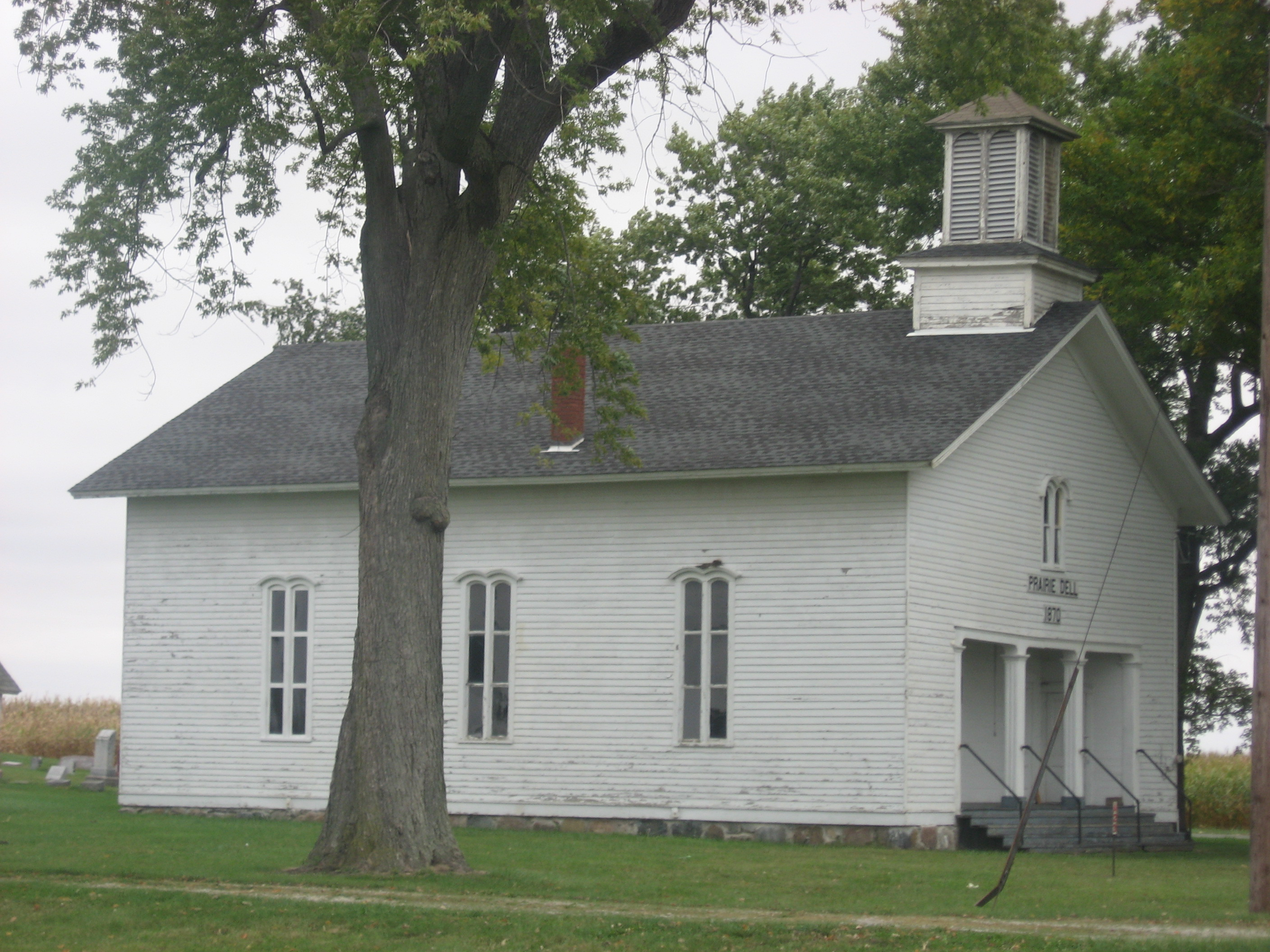

- Location within Illinois Location within the United States
- Location: Junction of 2550 East and 2150 North Rd., Iroquois, Illinois
- Coordinates: 40°49′34″N 87°38′40″W
- Area: 9.1 acres (3.7 ha)
- Built: 1870
- NRHP reference No.: 05000846
- Added to NRHP: August 12, 2005

The Prairie Dell Meetinghouse is a historic church building located at the junction of 2550 East and 2150 North Road west of Iroquois, Illinois. The church was built in 1870 by local farmers; it served congregations from multiple denominations and is the oldest known church in the area. The church has a vernacular frame design, common in rural churches of the period, with Greek Revival and Italianate details. Its Greek Revival features include its temple front, Doric columns and pediments at the entrance, and frieze, while its long, rectangular windows are its main Italianate element. The church housed both a variety of local, mainly Christian, congregations and many traveling preachers.

The church was added to the National Register of Historic Places on August 12, 2005.
