= North State Street Historic District =

Historic district in Illinois, United States

- U.S. National Register of Historic Places
- U.S. Historic district
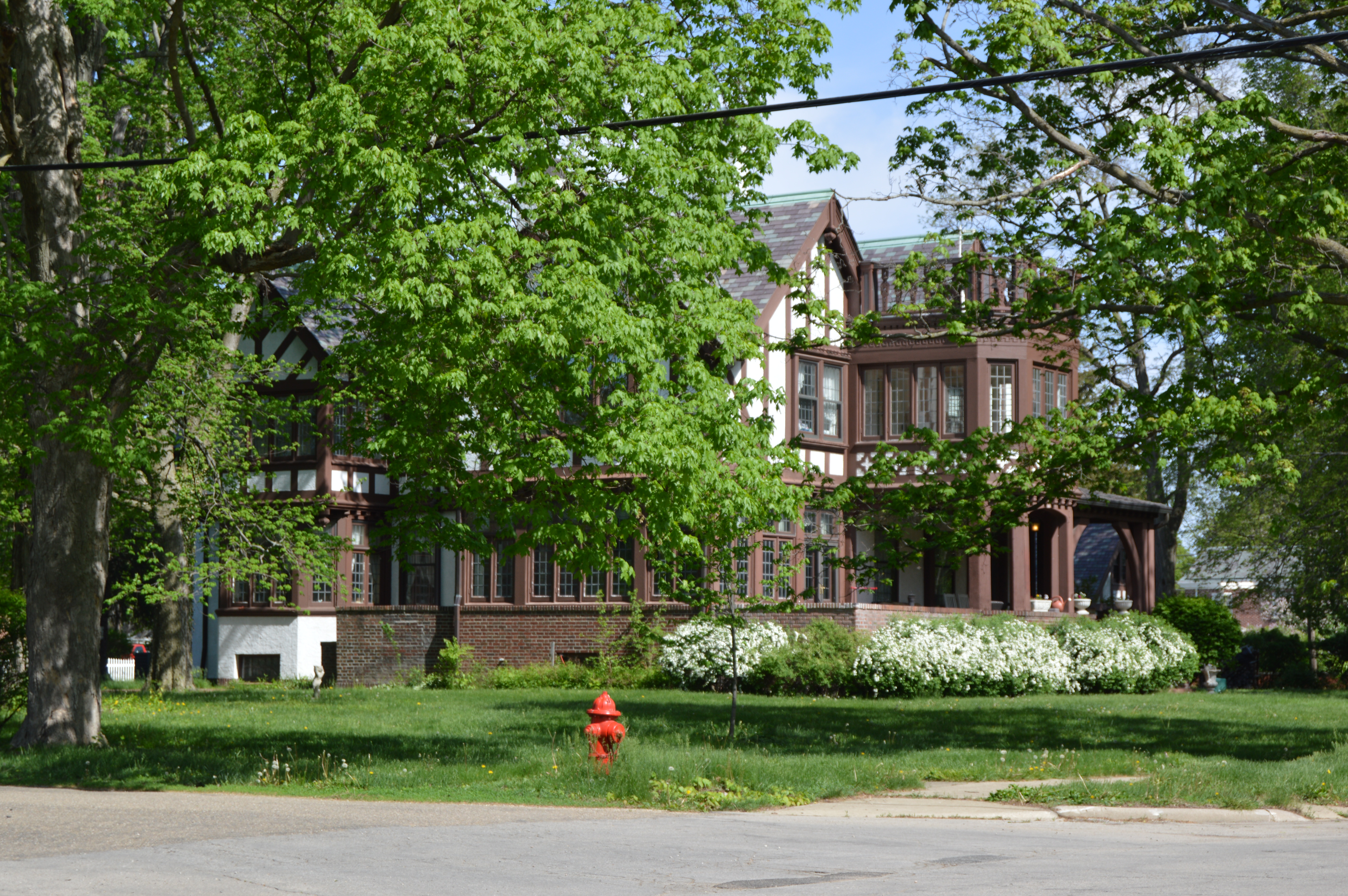
- 712 North State

- Location within Illinois Location within the United States
- Location: Roughly along N. State St., from 300-1100 blk., Monticello, Illinois
- Coordinates: 40°1′41″N 88°34′23″W
- Area: 30.5 acres (12.3 ha)
- NRHP reference No.: 98001045
- Added to NRHP: August 14, 1998

The North State Street Historic District is a nationally designated historic district in Monticello, Piatt County, Illinois. The residential district is centered on State Street north of downtown Monticello; it includes 77 buildings, 56 of which are considered contributing to its historic character. The houses in the district represent the variety of architectural styles seen in Monticello from 1870 to 1948, the ages of the oldest and newest houses. The oldest houses in the district are designed in the Gothic Revival and Queen Anne styles. In the early 20th century, Monticello experienced an economic boom due to growth in agriculture and the local patent medicine industry; its newly wealthy residents built homes on State Street, which became known locally as "Millionaire's Row". The majority of these new homes had Colonial Revival designs, as the style was nationally popular at the time; Colonial Revival is still the district's predominant architectural style. Other designs featured in the district include Craftsman, Tudor Revival, and a Lustron house built in 1948. The district also includes several vernacular house types, such as the I-house and the bungalow.

The district was added to the National Register of Historic Places on August 14, 1998.
