= Elliott Street Historic District =

United States historic place

- U.S. National Register of Historic Places
- U.S. Historic district
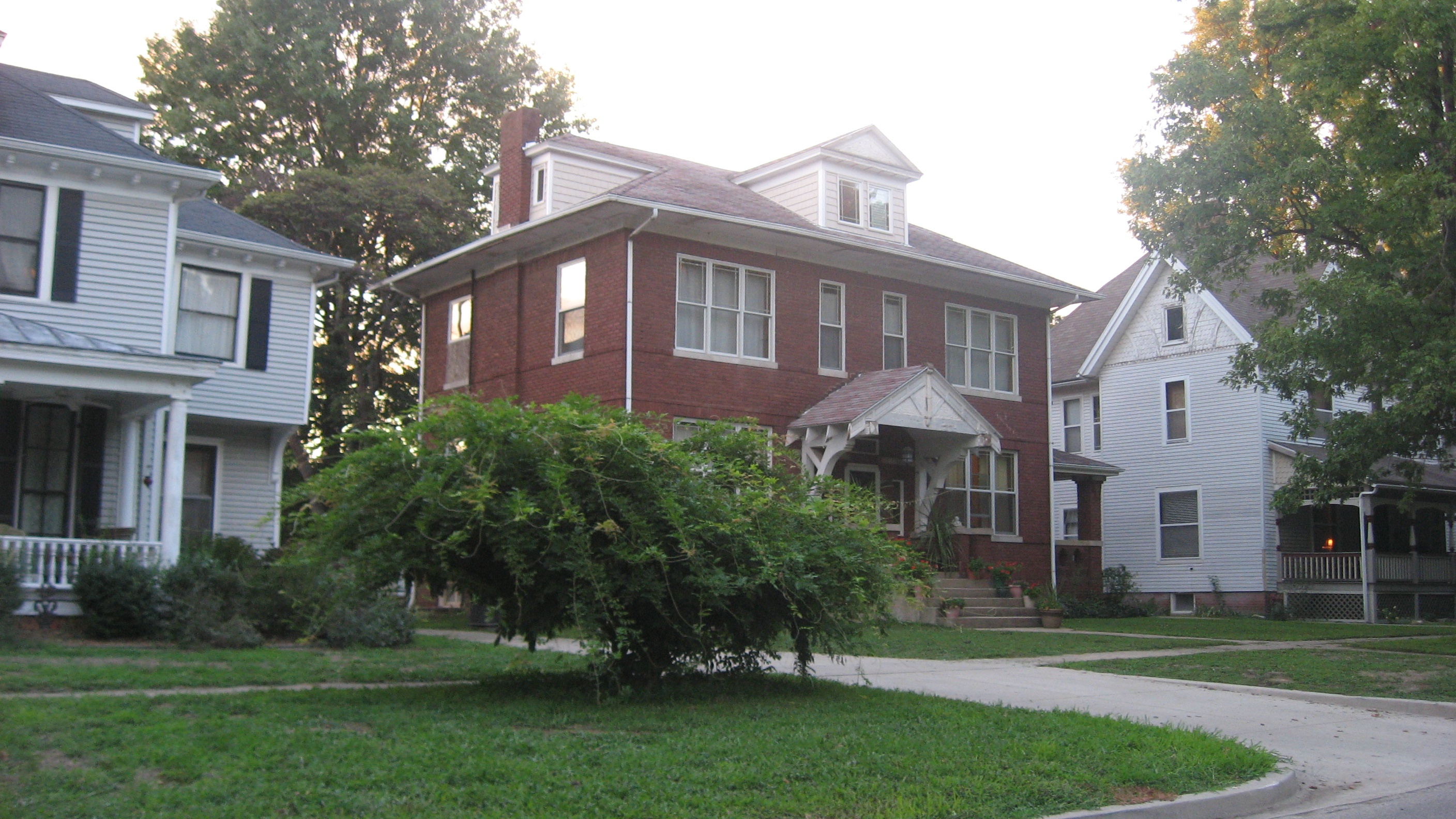
- Houses on the west side of the 400 block of South Elliott Street

- Location within Illinois Location within the United States
- Location: S. Elliott St. between Chestnut St. and South Ave., Olney, Illinois
- Coordinates: 38°43′32″N 88°4′48″W
- Architectural style: Georgian Revival, Italianate, Queen Anne
- NRHP reference No.: 80001405
- Added to NRHP: November 26, 1980

The Elliott Street Historic District is a historic district comprising five blocks of South Elliott Street in Olney, Illinois. The district is primarily residential; all but four of the 33 main buildings in the district are single-family homes. South Elliott Street has historically been one of the most desirable neighborhoods in Olney, and the area has consequently been known as the "Silk Stocking District" since the 1850s. The section of Olney including South Elliott Street was platted by William Elliott in 1855, shortly after the Ohio and Mississippi Railroad came through the city and sparked population growth and commercial development. Several of Olney's pioneers lived in the district, including Aaron Shaw, a U.S. Representative who gave the city its name. The houses in the district represent a variety of popular architectural styles of the late 19th and early 20th centuries, including Italianate, Queen Anne, and Georgian Revival.

The district was added to the National Register of Historic Places on November 26, 1980.
