= Larchmound =

Historic house in Illinois, United States

- U.S. National Register of Historic Places
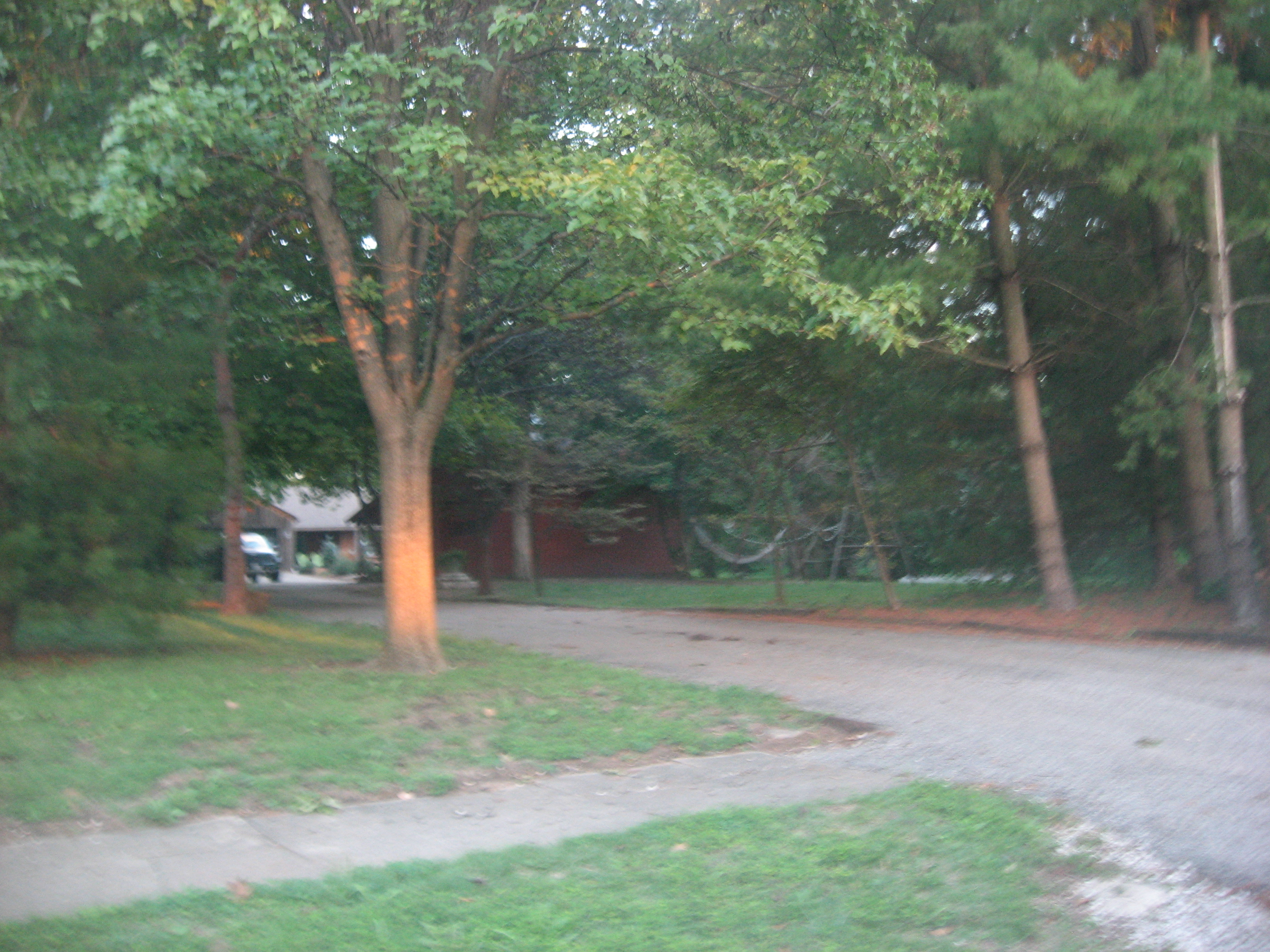
- The driveway leading to Larchmound

- Location within Illinois Location within the United States
- Location: 1030 S. Morgan St., Olney, Illinois
- Coordinates: 38°43′11″N 88°4′53″W
- Area: less than one acre
- Built: 1866
- Architectural style: Gothic
- NRHP reference No.: 80001406
- Added to NRHP: January 3, 1980

Larchmound is a house in Olney, Illinois, which was the home of ornithologist and botanist Robert Ridgway from 1913 until his death. The house was built in 1866; while its architecture does not entirely fit a specific style, its steep roofs suggest a Gothic influence. Ridgway moved to the home in 1913; the home was his second in the Olney area, as he had previously spent two summers at Bird Haven north of the city. While living at Larchmound, Ridgway wrote 27 of his published works, including three volumes of his most comprehensive book, The Birds of North and Middle America. Ridgway also conducted botanical research and planted tree specimens at both Larchmound and Bird Haven; while the land surrounded Bird Haven was inundated by a lake in 1970, many of Ridgway's original plantings survive on the remaining 2.69 acres (1.09 ha) at Larchmound.

The home was added to the National Register of Historic Places on January 3, 1980. Sadly the property, which had fallen into disrepair, was demolished the week of June 23, 2024.
