= Chalon Guard and Emma Blades Cloud House =

- U.S. National Register of Historic Places
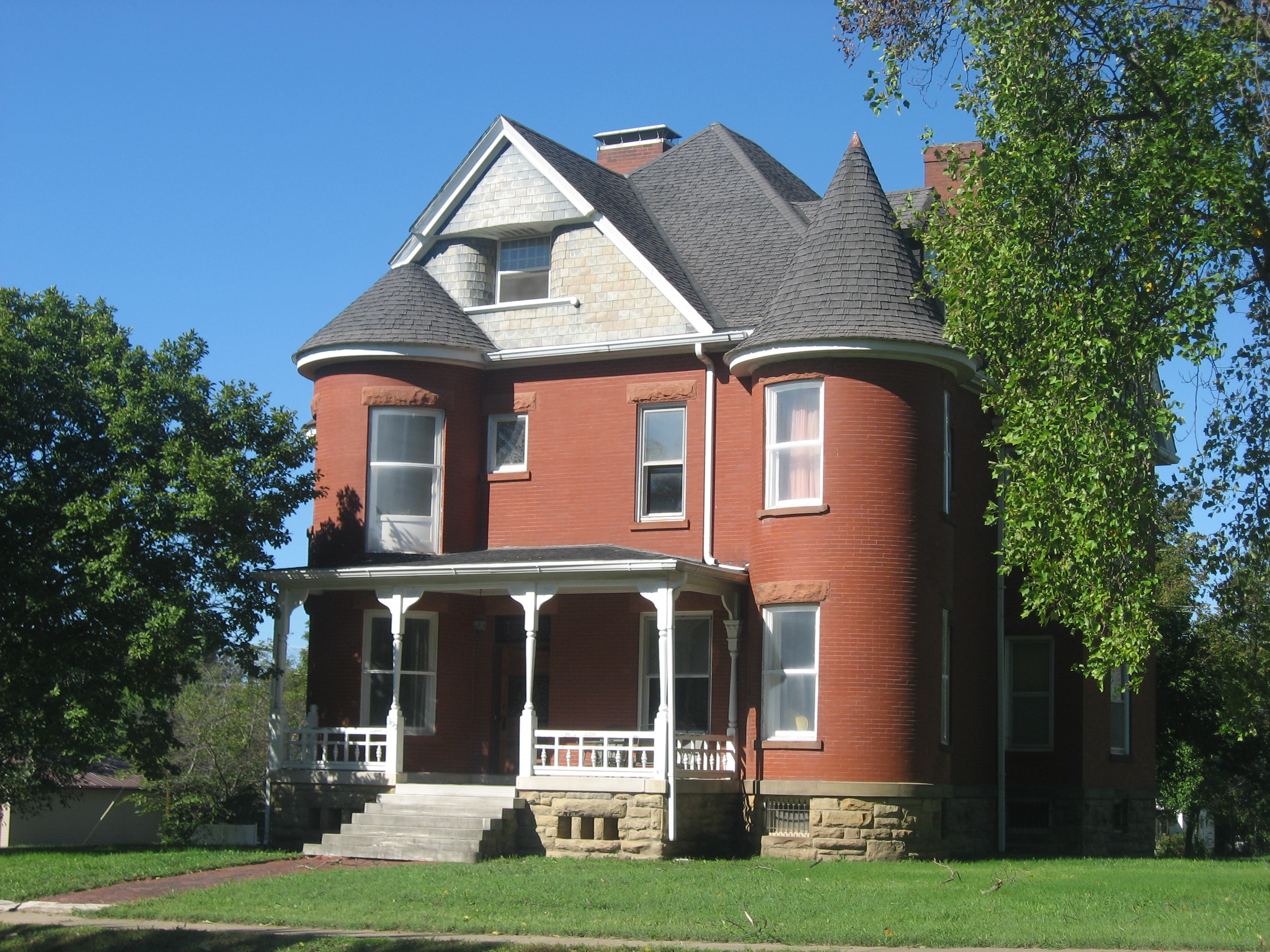

- Location within Illinois Location within the United States
- Location: 300 S. Washington St., McLeansboro, Illinois
- Coordinates: 38°5′33″N 88°32′9″W
- Area: 0.7 acres (0.28 ha)
- Built: 1892
- Built by: Chalon Guard Cloud
- Architect: Frank J. Schlotter or Merritt Reid (probable)
- Architectural style: Queen Anne, Shingle Style, Romanesque architecture
- NRHP reference No.: 09000026
- Added to NRHP: February 18, 2009

The Chalon Guard and Emma Blades Cloud House is a historic house located at 300 S. Washington St. in McLeansboro, Illinois. The house was built circa 1892 for Chalon Guard Cloud, who ran the Cloud State Bank with his father Aaron, and his wife Emma Blades Cloud. The house's design features a distinctive blend of architectural styles; while primarily designed in the Queen Anne style, it also includes elements of the Shingle and Romanesque styles. The house is built of red brick with a limestone foundation; the brick masonry walls of the house are characteristic of Richardsonian Romanesque architecture and represent the only residential use of the style in McLeansboro. Two conical turrets mark the front corners of the house; two other turrets are located on the south side of the home. A large roof gable, which connects to the top of the smaller southern turret, is sided in slate-colored shingles typical of the Shingle Style. The house's front porch, which was added in the early 20th century, features turned columns and a spindlework railing. The house's multi-component roof features several cross gables and three brick chimneys.

The house was owned by NBA player and coach Jerry Sloan from 1982 to 2005. The house was added to the National Register of Historic Places on February 18, 2009.
