= Clarksburg, Illinois =

- Unincorporated community
- Location within Illinois Location within the United States
- Coordinates: 39°19′48″N 88°44′30″W
- Country: United States
- State: Illinois
- County: Shelby
- Elevation: 620 ft (190 m)
- Time zone: UTC-6 (Central (CST))
  - Summer (DST): UTC-5 (CDT)
- Area code: 217
- GNIS feature ID: 406176

Clarksburg is an unincorporated community in Clarksburg Township, Shelby County, Illinois, United States. Clarksburg is located on County Route 7, 5.9 miles (9.5 km) south-southeast of Shelbyville.
