= Horace M. Tallman House =

Historic house in Illinois, United States

- U.S. National Register of Historic Places
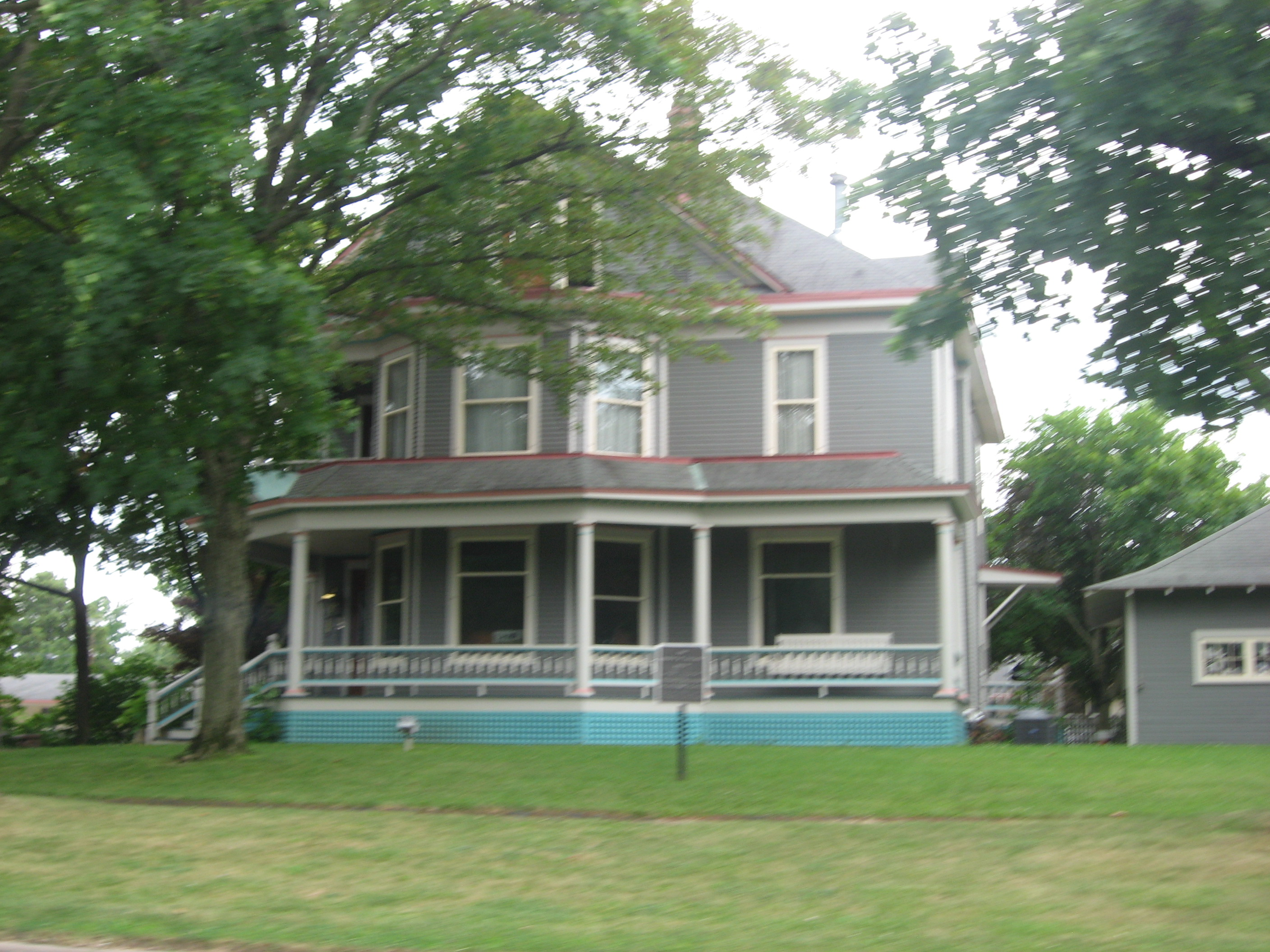

- Location within Illinois Location within the United States
- Location: 816 W. Main, Shelbyville, Illinois
- Coordinates: 39°24′23″N 88°48′11″W
- Area: 0.2 acres (0.081 ha)
- Built: 1905
- Architectural style: Queen Anne
- NRHP reference No.: 88000470
- Added to NRHP: May 6, 1988

The Horace M. Tallman House is a historic house located at 816 W. Main St. in Shelbyville, Illinois. Horace M. Tallman built the Queen Anne house for his family in 1905. Tallman was a farmer and farm implement salesman, and he became the owner of the Ann Arbor Machine Company in 1920. In 1928–29, Tallman invented the pickup hay baler, which automated the process of baling and collecting hay. While Tallman died in 1929, his sons developed and marketed the baler, which became a labor-saving machine which permanently changed farming practices. Tallman's house is the only surviving building connected to Tallman and the invention of the pickup hay baler.

The house was added to the National Register of Historic Places on May 6, 1988.
