= Tri-County Conference (Illinois) =

- Conference: IHSA
- Founded: 1927
- No. of teams: 10
- Region: North Central Illinois (LaSalle, Livingston, Marshall, Putnam, and Woodford counties)

The Tri-County Conference is a high school conference in north central Illinois. The conference participates in athletics and activities in the Illinois High School Association. The conference incorporates 8 small public and 2 small private high schools, with enrollments between 82 and 428 students in LaSalle, Livingston, Marshall, Putnam, and Woodford counties.

== History ==
The first year of competition for the Tri-County was 1927 with ten charter schools: Hennepin, Henry, Hopkins Township in Granville, Lacon, Lostant, Magnolia, Senachwine Township in Putnam, McNabb Swaney, Tonica, and Varna. During the lifetime of the conference, most of these ten very small rural schools have remained in the league in one form or another. Some have left and returned and many of them have consolidated to become new entities. Regardless, the conference has changed many times over the years.

The first two schools to consolidate were Henry and Senachwine Township High Schools. The new high school became known as Henry-Senachwine Consolidated High School beginning in the fall of 1947 and would be located in Putnam, Illinois. The following year, Magnolia High School merged into Swaney High School near the town of McNabb, ceasing the existence of the Magnolia Pirates. In 1949, Varna High School consolidated with Lacon High School to create Mid-County High School, located in Varna. Sparland, a team that was part of the Tri-County but left for the Little 6 Conference in 1958, consolidated with Mid-County High School to form Midland High School in 1995.

Rutland joined the Tri-County in the early 1930s; however, they would leave for the Mid State Conference during a consolidation with the Minonk-Dana School District in 1956. This new high school would be known as Minonk-Dana-Rutland. Toluca and Wenona High Schools joined the Tri-County in the early 1930s; however, in 1992 they consolidated with Minonk-Dana-Rutland to create Fieldcrest High School located in Minonk, Illinois. Fieldcrest remained in the Mid State Conference.

Some small schools would cease operations during the course of time. Original member, Lostant High School in Lostant, Illinois, remained a member of the conference until 1958 when it would join the Little 6 Conference. They would return to the Tri-County in 1961; however, in 1993 the school closed due to financial constraints. Students from Lostant were given options to attend one of four nearby schools: Fieldcrest, Putnam County, Streator, or LaSalle-Peru.

During the 1950s and 60s, there was a push in the state to consolidate rural districts. Several schools in the Tri-County followed the initiative and either merged or consolidated. In 1956, the high schools of Roanoke and Benson, long-time rivals, consolidated to form Roanoke-Benson High School and continue to be a member of the conference. Washburn High School, located in Washburn, Illinois, was a school that had existed in the league since 1929; however, it would consolidate with the high school from Lowpoint to create Lowpoint-Washburn High School in 1952. In 1966, two charter schools, Hennepin and Hopkins Township, would consolidate with previously consolidated Magnolia-Swaney High School to form Putnam County High School.

During the tenure of the Tri-County, schools like Eureka, Bureau Valley, and Peoria Christian joined and left. Another example of a school that would join the league and leave is DePue High School. DePue would leave the Indian Valley Conference in 1994, join the Tri-County, only to leave in 2020 to join the Little Ten Conference. Bradford High School, who joined the league in 1994, was deactivated in 2001 based on low enrollment. Students from Bradford were given the choice of attending Bureau Valley, Henry-Senachwine, or Stark County High Schools.

For nearly a century, the Tri-County has remained in operation with at least six high schools. Currently the league consists of six full members and four partial members, the full members are; Putnam County, Henry-Senachwine, Roanoke-Benson, Streator Woodland, Varna Midland, and Lowpoint-Washburn. Beginning in 2023–24 school year, Peru St. Bede, Dwight and Ottawa Marquette will compete in the Tri-County for all sports except football, which will compete in the newly formed Chicago Prairie Football League. Seneca, also a partial member of the Tri-County, plays in the Vermilion Valley (South) Conference for football.

Locations of Tri-County Conference Schools

== Member schools ==
School	Location	County	Mascot	Colors	Joined	Previous Conference	Enrollment	IHSA Classes 1/2/3/4	IHSA Football Class	IHSA Football Type
Dwight High School	Dwight, IL	Livingston	Trojans	Green, White	2021	Sangamon Valley	264.44	A/1A/1A	2A/3A	11-man Coop
Henry-Senachwine High School	Henry, IL	Marshall	Mallards	Red, Black	1947	—	136.83	A/1A/1A	—	None
Lowpoint-Washburn High School	Washburn, IL	Woodford	Wildcats	Maroon, Gold	1952	—	82.335	A/1A/1A	—	None
Marquette Academy	Ottawa, IL	LaSalle	Crusaders	Navy, Vegas Gold	1994	Big Northern	154	A/1A/1A	1A	11-man
Midland High School	Varna, IL	Marshall	Timberwolves	Dark Green, Silver, Black	1995	—	206.085	A/1A/1A	—	None
Putnam County High School	Granville, IL	Putnam	Panthers	Black, Gold	1966	—	258.35	A/1A/1A	4A	11-man Coop
Roanoke-Benson High School	Roanoke, IL	Woodford	Rockets	Black, White	1956	—	160	A/1A/1A	—	None
Seneca High School	Seneca, IL	LaSalle	Fighting Irish; Lady Irish	Green, White	2018	Interstate Eight	428.5	1A/2A	2A/3A	11-man
St. Bede Academy	Peru, IL	LaSalle	Bruins	Green, White	2023	Three Rivers	282	A/1A/1A	1A	11-man
Woodland High School	Streator, IL	Livingston	Warriors	Red, Black, White	2006	Mid-State	157	A/1A/1A	1A	11-man Coop

== Previous Members ==
School	Location	Mascot	Colors	Year Joined	Year Exited	School In Use	Consolidated	Current District
Hennepin High School	Hennepin, IL	Mallards	Red, White	1927	1966	Yes	Yes	Putnam County
Henry Township High School	Henry, IL	Mallards	Crimson, Black	1927	1947	No	Yes	Henry-Senachwine
Hopkins Township High School	Granville, IL	Hornets	Green, White	1927	1966	No	Yes	Putnam County
Lacon Community High School	Lacon, IL	Lions	Maroon, White	1927	1949	Yes	Yes	Mid-County
Lostant High School	Lostant, IL	Rams	Orange, Blue	1927, 1961	1958, 1993	Yes	No	School Closed
Magnolia High School	Magnolia, IL	Pirates	Maroon, Gold	1927	1948	No	Yes	Magnolia-Swaney
Senachwine Township High School	Putnam, IL	Braves	Unknown	1927	1947	No	Yes	Henry-Senachwine
Swaney High School	McNabb, IL	Pirates	Blue, Gold	1927	1948	Yes	Yes	Magnolia-Swaney
Tonica High School	Tonica, IL	Warriors	Blue, White	1927	1990	Yes	No	School Closed
Varna High School	Varna, IL	Green Dragons	Green, White	1927	1990	No	Yes	Mid-County
Washburn High School	Washburn, IL	Unknown	Unknown	1929	1952	Yes	Yes	Lowpoint-Washburn
Roanoke High School	Roanoke, IL	Unknown	Unknown	1930	1956	Yes	Yes	Roanoke-Benson
Rutland High School	Rutland, IL	Rangers	Maroon, White	1932	1956	No	Yes	Minonk-Dana-Rutland
Toluca High School	Toluca, IL	Wildcats	Purple, Gold, White	1932	1992	Yes	Yes	Fieldcrest
Wenona High School	Wenona, IL	Mustangs	Black, Orange	1932	1992	Yes	Yes	Fieldcrest
Benson High School	Benson, IL	Broncos	Black, Orange	1939	1956	Yes	Yes	Roanoke-Benson
Sparland High School	Sparland, IL	Hilltoppers	Red, White	1939	1958	Yes	Yes	Midland
Magnolia-Swaney High School	McNabb, IL	Pirates	Blue, Gold	1948	1966	Yes	Yes	Putnam County
Mid-County High School	Varna, IL	Bulldogs	Black, White	1949	1995	Yes	Yes	Midland
Bradford High School	Bradford, IL	Panthers	Black, Orange	1994	2001	No	No	School Closed
DePue High School	DePue, IL	Little Giants	Blue, Orange	1994	2020	Yes	No	DCUSD #103
Eureka High School	Eureka, IL	Hornets	Green, White	1995	2006	Yes	No	ECUD #140
Bureau Valley High School	Manlius, IL	Storm	Navy, Columbia	1997	2006	Yes	No	BVCUSD #340
Peoria Christian High School	Peoria, IL	Chargers	Purple, Gold, White	1997	2021	Yes	No	Peoria Christian Schools

Sources:IHSA Conferences, and IHSA Member Schools Directory

=== Membership timeline ===
Full members Sources:Illinois High School Glory Days,

== Boys Basketball Tournament Championships ==
Year	Winning team	Score	Losing team	Score	Regular Season Champions
2025	Seneca	39	Marquette	36	Seneca
2024	Seneca	68	Marquette	54	Marquette
2023	Marquette	59	Seneca	54	Marquette
2022	Midland	49	Seneca	40	Midland
2021	Not held due to COVID-19				Roanoke-Benson
2020	Roanoke-Benson	55	Peoria Christian	51	Roanoke-Benson
2019	Marquette	48	Seneca	39	Marquette
2018	DePue	51	Roanoke-Benson	25	DePue
2017	Marquette	59	Roanoke-Benson	37	Marquette
2016	Marquette	45	Putnam County	43	Marquette, Putnam County
2015	Peoria Christian	75	Marquette	69	Marquette
2014	Putnam County	70	Henry-Senachwine	46	Henry-Senachwine
2013	Putnam County	55	Hall	54	Putnam County
2012	Peoria Christian	59	Putnam County	49	Putnam County, Peoria Christian
2011	Lowpoint-Washburn	49	Midland	45	Putnam County
2010	Midland	64	Woodland	63	Midland
2009	Peoria Christian	48	Putnam County	45	Peoria Christian
2008	Putnam County	51	Roanoke-Benson	40	Putnam County
2007	Putnam County	85	Peoria Christian	65	Putnam County, Peoria Christian, Roanoke-Benson
2006	Marquette	63	Putnam County	60	Putnam County
2005	Putnam County	71	Marquette	64	Putnam County
2004	Eureka	66	Peoria Christian	50	Peoria Christian
2003	Putnam County	68	Eureka	61	Peoria Christian, Eureka
2002	Peoria Christian	66	Putnam County	33	Peoria Christian
2001	St. Bede	62	Midland	58	St. Bede, Eureka
2000	Eureka	73	Putnam County	61	Eureka
1999	Eureka	75	Midland	58	Midland, Bureau Valley, Eureka
1998	Henry	68	Bureau Valley	49	Putnam County, St. Bede
1997	Eureka	49	St. Bede	45	Eureka
1996	Marquette	54	Henry	52	Marquette
1995	Roanoke-Benson	58	Marquette	55	Putnam County
1994	Mid-County	69	Roanoke-Benson	68	Roanoke-Benson
1993	Roanoke-Benson	64	Mid-County	62	Roanoke-Benson
1992	Mid-County	54	Putnam County	51	Mid-County
1991	Lostant	47	Toluca	45	Lowpoint-Washburn
1990	Roanoke-Benson	72	Lowpoint-Washburn	49	Roanoke-Benson
1989	Mid-County	83	Lowpoint-Washburn	75	Mid-County
1988	Lowpoint-Washburn	58	Toluca	52	Roanoke-Benson
1987	Toluca	55	Mid-County	42	Putnam County
1986	Roanoke-Benson	67	Lostant	62	Putnam County, Toluca
1985	Roanoke-Benson	59	Toluca	47	Roanoke-Benson
1984	Toluca	55	Roanoke-Benson	46	Toluca
1983	Toluca	55	Putnam County	47	Mid-County, Toluca, Roanoke-Benson
1982	Putnam County	69	Roanoke-Benson	62	Putnam County
1981	Putnam County	72	Lostant	36	Putnam County
1980	Mid-County	59	Wenona	57	Wenona, Putnam County
1979	Roanoke-Benson	55	Mid-County	52	Roanoke-Benson
1978	Roanoke-Benson	73	Lowpoint-Washburn	62	Roanoke-Benson, Mid-County
1977	Henry	57	Lowpoint-Washburn	54	Henry
1976	Henry	70	Roanoke-Benson	59	Henry, Roanoke-Benson
1975	Roanoke-Benson	54	Lostant	45	Roanoke-Benson
1974	Putnam County	70	Roanoke-Benson	65	Putnam County
1973	Wenona	68	Toluca	55	Wenona
1972	Toluca	56	Wenona	54	Henry
1971	Wenona	56	Henry	47	Toluca
1970	Henry	78	Lowpoint-Washburn	52	Toluca
1969	Toluca	70	Henry	49	Toluca
1968	Putnam County	61	Toluca	60	Putnam County
1967	Wenona	62	Lowpoint-Washburn	51	Putnam County
1966	Wenona	75	Lowpoint-Washburn	58	Toluca
1965	Wenona	67	Toluca	58	Wenona, Mid-County
1964	Toluca	78	Wenona	66	Toluca
1963	Toluca	62	Mid-County	52	Toluca
1962	Toluca	69	Henry	61	Toluca
1961	Toluca	57	Mid-County	54	Toluca
1960	Toluca	57	Mid-County	52	Toluca
1959	Toluca	47	Henry	37	Toluca
1958	Toluca	74	Tonica	63	Toluca
1957	Toluca	52	Tonica	45	Toluca, Tonica
1956	Benson	70	Roanoke	65	Wenona
1955	Wenona	52	Tonica	50	
1954	Wenona	55	Henry	53	
1953	Wenona	62	Mid-County	60	
1952	Mid-County	46	Henry	38	
1951	Wenona	40	Henry	35	
1950	Wenona	59	Toluca	46	
1949	Henry	37	Wenona	35	
1948	Henry	51	Toluca	46	
1947	Toluca	40	Wenona	39	
1946	Henry	37	Hopkins	34	
1945	Toluca	50	Hopkins	23	
1944	Lostant	44	Henry	33	
1943	Henry	38	Toluca	22	
1942	Toluca	47	Wenona	27	
1941	Hopkins	19	Henry	14	
1940	Henry	21	Hopkins	18	
1939	Henry	19	Wenona	16	
1938	Hopkins	20	Wenona	18	
1937	Hopkins	36	Wenona	31	
1936	Hopkins	19	Wenona	13	
1935	Hopkins	25	Tonica	17	
1934	Hopkins	21	Henry	14	
1933	Hopkins	25	Wenona	23	
1932	Wenona	29	Varna	21	
1931	Wenona	26	John Swaney	20	
1930	Wenona	18	John Swaney	17	
1929	Varna	40	Lostant	18	
1928	Lostant	20	Varna	10	
1927	Lostant	23	Tonica	20	

== Tri-County Conference Tournament Championships ==
School	No. of Titles
Toluca	16
Wenona	12
Henry	11
Putnam County	10
Roanoke-Benson	9
Hopkins	7
Marquette	6
Mid-County	5
Lostant	4
Eureka	4
Peoria Christian	4
Lowpoint-Washburn	2
Midland	2
Seneca	2
Varna	1
St. Bede	1
Benson	1
DePue	1
