= Tornado outbreak of April 20, 2004 =

Natural disaster in the US

April 20, 2004 tornado outbreak
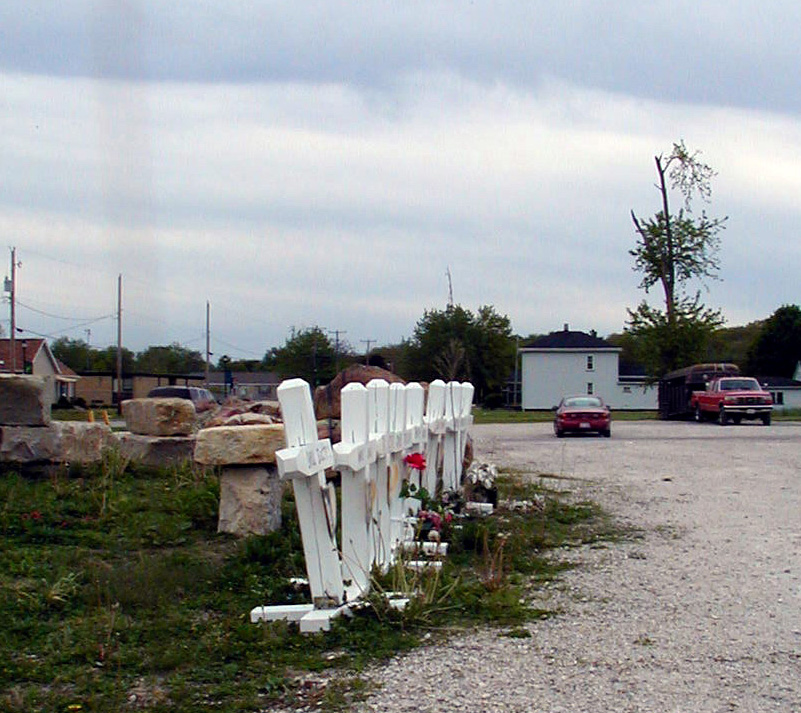
- Memorial crosses, Utica

Meteorological history
- Duration: April 20, 2004

Tornado outbreak
- Tornadoes: 31
- Max. rating: F3 tornado
- Duration: Approximately 4 hours

Overall effects
- Fatalities: 8 (+1 indirect)
- Injuries: 21
- Areas affected: Illinois, Indiana, Iowa
- Part of the tornado outbreaks of 2004

A destructive tornado outbreak devastated parts of the U.S. Upper Midwest on April 20, 2004. A total of 31 tornadoes formed in eastern Iowa, extending into northern and central Illinois and Indiana. A tornado that struck Utica, Illinois, was the only one to cause fatalities. The outbreak was largely unexpected, as the SPC had only predicted a "slight risk" of severe weather in the afternoon of the event.

== Confirmed tornadoes ==
Confirmed tornadoes by Fujita rating
FU	F0	F1	F2	F3	F4	F5	Total
0	18	10	2	1	0	0	31

List of confirmed tornadoes - Tuesday, April 20, 2004
F#	Location	County	Time (UTC)	Path length	Damage
Illinois
F0	NW of Victoria	Knox	2216	unknown	Destroyed one farm building and damaged two other farm buildings. Trees and power lines were downed as well.
F1	E of Wyoming to W of Whitefield	Stark, Marshall, Bureau	2213	unknown	In Stark County, the tornado blew out 5 windows at a house and damaged the roof of a barn. In Marshall County, a barn and a pole barn were destroyed, farm equipment was damaged, and a grain bin was blown into a field. In Bureau County, the tornado struck a farmstead before dissipating, damaging the roof of the farmhouse along with several barns and outbuildings.
F3	Granville/Utica areas	Putnam, LaSalle	2273	15.8 miles	8 deaths - See section on this tornado
F2	N of Utica to Ottawa	LaSalle	2316	9 miles	Multiple-vortex tornado touched down just outside Utica after the main F3 dissipated. East of town, it caused damage to 2 homes, trees, and outbuildings. Part of the roof of a house was torn off. A garage and grain bin were destroyed, and another garage lost its roof. The tornado then crossed I-80, damaging a building and flipping a semi-tractor trailer. The tornado then destroyed a machine shed and downed several power poles and trees. Two houses in this area were damaged before the tornado dissipated, with one sustaining roof damage, and the other losing most of its second story.
F0	E of Utica	LaSalle	2316	2.5 miles	Satellite tornado to the second Utica tornado. Caused no damage.
F1	W of Wedron	LaSalle	2355	unknown	Tornado overturned a shed and a camping trailer, and snapped several trees. A detached garage was completely destroyed.
F0	S of Sheridan	LaSalle	2383	2 miles	Minor tree damage occurred.
F0	SW of Minooka	Grundy	0016	unknown	Tornado struck an industrial complex. A wastewater treatment building was destroyed, with walls blown out and structural beams bent. There was damage to overhead doors, and an air handling unit was torn from a roof of another building. Further east, there was damage to walls and roof of an outbuilding. Antennas was blown down at the fire station on Route 6.
F1	Joliet	Will	0075	1.6 miles	Tornado affected mainly residential areas. Extensive tree damage occurred, and structures sustained minor damage. Roofs were blown off of a few homes and garages were destroyed as well.
F1	S of Kankakee	Kankakee	0056	unknown	A house had its roof torn off, and numerous trees were snapped and uprooted. An empty corrugated grain bin was pushed into a tree. The tornado continued northeast to the Cognis chemical plant where the brick wall of a building fell outward. About 200 feet of chain link fence was torn up. Several cinder block buildings were damaged or destroyed in this complex just northeast of where the fence was taken out. A nearby bus garage sustained roof damage. A barn and several sheds were destroyed as well.
F0	N of Piper City (1st tornado)	Ford	2386	unknown	A grain bin and an outbuilding were damaged.
F0	N of Piper City (2nd tornado)	Ford	2386	unknown	Remained over open country with no damage.
F0	W of Ashkum	Iroquois	2398	5 miles	Remained over open country with no damage.
F2	NW of Hopkins Park	Kankakee	0030	3 miles	Several homes were damaged, a mobile home was destroyed, and large trees were knocked down or damaged. A church lost its roof and some walls. Two irrigation systems were overturned as well.
F0	Grant Park	Kankakee	0105	3 miles	A few homes in town sustained minor roof damage. Part of the roof of the fire station was peeled off, and a fence was damaged. Trees were downed, and a farm building sustained minor damage as well.
F0	SE of Beecher	Will	0130	1.5 miles	Tornado pulled shingles off of two mobile homes, and damaged the roof of a barn.
F1	NW of Tuscola to SW of Pesotum	Douglas, Champaign	1900	unknown	Tornado damaged the front porch of a home, destroyed the garage, damaged a couple of sheds, and blew down several large trees. When the garage collapsed, it damaged a 1975 Corvette, as well as another car and two antique tractors. A nearby abandoned house was damaged as well. Tornado crossed into Champaign County, where it destroyed a barn, as well as several trees and power lines before dissipating.
F0	NW of Sidney	Champaign	1953	unknown	Brief touchdown over open fields.
Iowa
F1	NW of Welton	Clinton	0013	1.3 miles	A machine shed was destroyed, as well as a 100-year-old barn and a hog building. A farmhouse sustained minor shingle and siding damage, and a nearby water tower had its wooden roof torn off.
Indiana
F1	Jamestown	Boone	2266	2 miles	Caused significant damage to a dozen homes in town. 2 homes had their roofs blown completely off and tossed several hundred feet into a corn field. There were 8 minor injuries, including one man whose semi was blown over along Interstate 74.
F0	SW of Lebanon	Boone	2275	unknown	Scattered minor damage occurred.
F1	E of Frankfort	Clinton	2225	3.8 miles	Tornado destroyed 2 garages and a high school scoreboard, and also damaged a barn.
F0	SE of Russiaville	Howard	2275	unknown	A barn was destroyed and a grain bin was overturned.
F1	Kokomo	Howard	2300	.7 miles	Tornado severely damaged a skating rink and trucking company. There was also damage to 3 other homes. 1 minor injury was reported.
F0	W of Amboy	Miami	2340	1 miles	Tornado left swirl marks in a field. No actual damage occurred.
F1	SW of Lincolnville	Wabash	0013	2 miles	Two homes were heavily damaged and a barn was destroyed.
F0	N of Harlansburg	Huntington	0041	3.5 miles	There was minor damage to 5 homes and some trees.
F0	E of Huntington	Huntington	0066	6 miles	Minor tree damage occurred.
F0	Point Isabel area	Grant	0051	unknown	Brief touchdown in a field with damage.
F0	N of Elwood	Madison	0040	unknown	A barn was destroyed.
F0	E of Fairmount	Grant	0043	4 miles	Trees were damaged and power poles were snapped.
Sources: Severe Weather Outbreak of April 20, 2004, Tornado History Project Tornado Map - April 20, 2004, The April 20, 2004 Deadly Tornado Outbreak in Illinois and Indiana

=== Granville–Utica, Illinois ===
Granville–Utica, Illinois
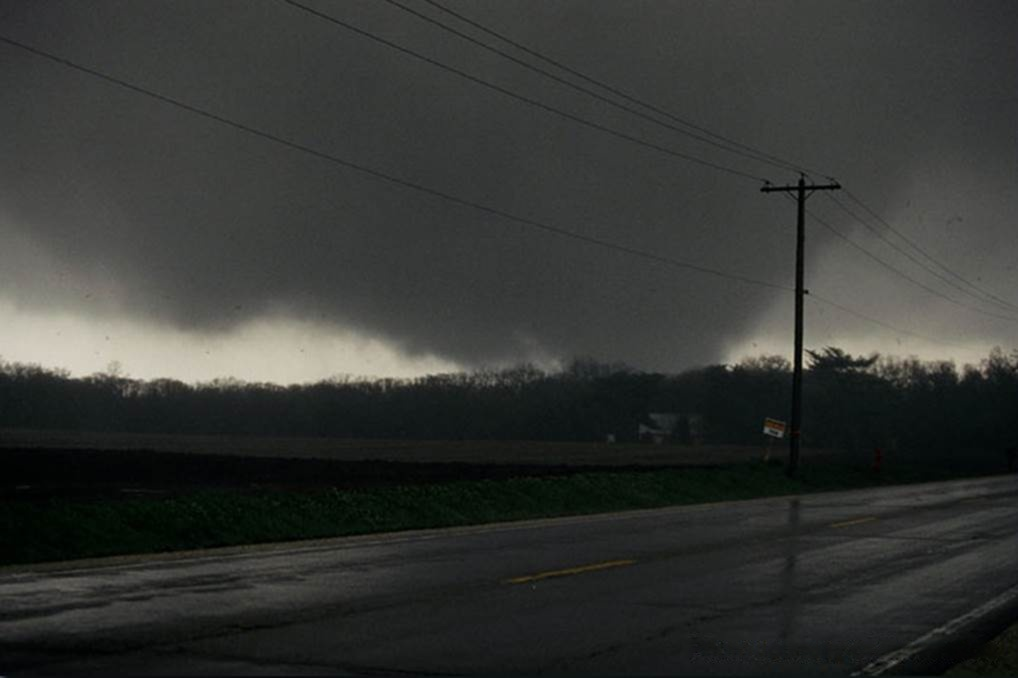
- A photo of the F3 tornado that hit Utica, Illinois on April 20, 2004

Meteorological history
- Formed: April 20, 2004, 5:35 p.m. CDT
- Dissipated: April 20, 2004, 6:17 p.m. CDT
- Duration: 42 minutes

F3 tornado
- on the Fujita scale
- Highest winds: 158–206 mph (254–332 km/h)

Overall effects
- Fatalities: 8 (+1 indirect)
- Injuries: 7
- Damage: $8+ million (2004 USD)

The only fatal tornado of the outbreak touched down in Putnam County, Illinois, north of Florid, before moving east and striking Granville. Witnesses reported a multiple-vortex tornado just before it arrived in Granville. The town was bisected by the half-mile-wide tornado with 12 buildings destroyed, 45 with major damage, and 26 with minor damage (mainly residential). The Granville State National Bank lost its roof, and Hopkins Elementary School lost the roof over the old gymnasium, with damage in nearly all the classrooms. Significant damage also occurred to Granville Drugs, the only drug store in town. In Granville, 5 people were injured by the tornado, including an elderly woman who suffered a heart attack during the tornado and was eventually evacuated via Life Flight to a Peoria hospital. Injuries were low due to the 32 minutes of lead time before the tornado struck Granville. Damage in Granville was estimated to be at least $8 million, with the school suffering at least $3.5 million in damage. Damage in town was rated high-end F2.

The tornado entered LaSalle County, Illinois from Putnam County, approximately 3 miles (5 km) northeast of the town of Standard, producing F0 intensity damage in a wooded area southwest of Peru. As the tornado continued northeast, F2 intensity damage was done to several homes in a subdivision near the intersection of East 250th and 2569th Roads. Several roofs were blown off homes, along with damage to external walls. Significant tree damage was done as well. Path width was estimated at 50 yards (45 m) at this location. The tornado then continued northeast, crossing the Illinois River twice as it moved toward the town of Utica, downing a steel high tension tower on the north bank of the river, immediately west of Illinois Route 251. The tornado moved into the southwest side of Utica, where it was at F0 intensity. Homes along Washington Street only had tree and minor roof damage. A church steeple was damaged between Johnson and Washington streets. Roofs and trees were more severely damaged on the south side of Johnson Street. The tornado rapidly increased to F3 intensity on the north side of Johnson Street, where one home had its roof taken off, and the north walls were blown out. A machinery building was destroyed on the south side of the canal, and a semi-tractor-trailer was blown into the canal. A large grain bin was blown across the canal and flattened. The tornado then moved north of the canal into the heart of town, where several homes were severely damaged, garages were destroyed, and brick buildings collapsed. Eight people died, and seven were rescued from the basement of the turn-of-the-century sandstone Milestone Tap tavern. The structure collapsed when a vehicle was thrown into it. The tornado was approximately 250 yards wide at this point. On the east edge of the vortex along Mill Street, in downtown, buildings suffered damage to facades, roofs, and windows. East of Mill Street, there was damage to trees and minor roof damage. In the northeast section of town, a mobile home was overturned just east of Mill Street. The vortex crossed the railroad tracks and apparently dissipated on a steep bluff on the northeast side of town. At the top of the hill, there were some trees and limbs downed, and some debris from town was deposited.

On June 2, 2004, the Village Clerk's son was stillborn. The clerk, Angela Brown, had worked 16-hour days after the tornado hit until his birth, and she stated her doctors attributed his death in part to stress as a result of this work. In a memorial service on April 19, 2005, the city of Utica recognized him as the ninth victim (though this death is not counted in the official NCDC total).

== See also ==
- List of North American tornadoes and tornado outbreaks
  - List of tornadoes with confirmed satellite tornadoes
