= Cortland Condit House =

Historic house in Illinois, United States

- U.S. National Register of Historic Places
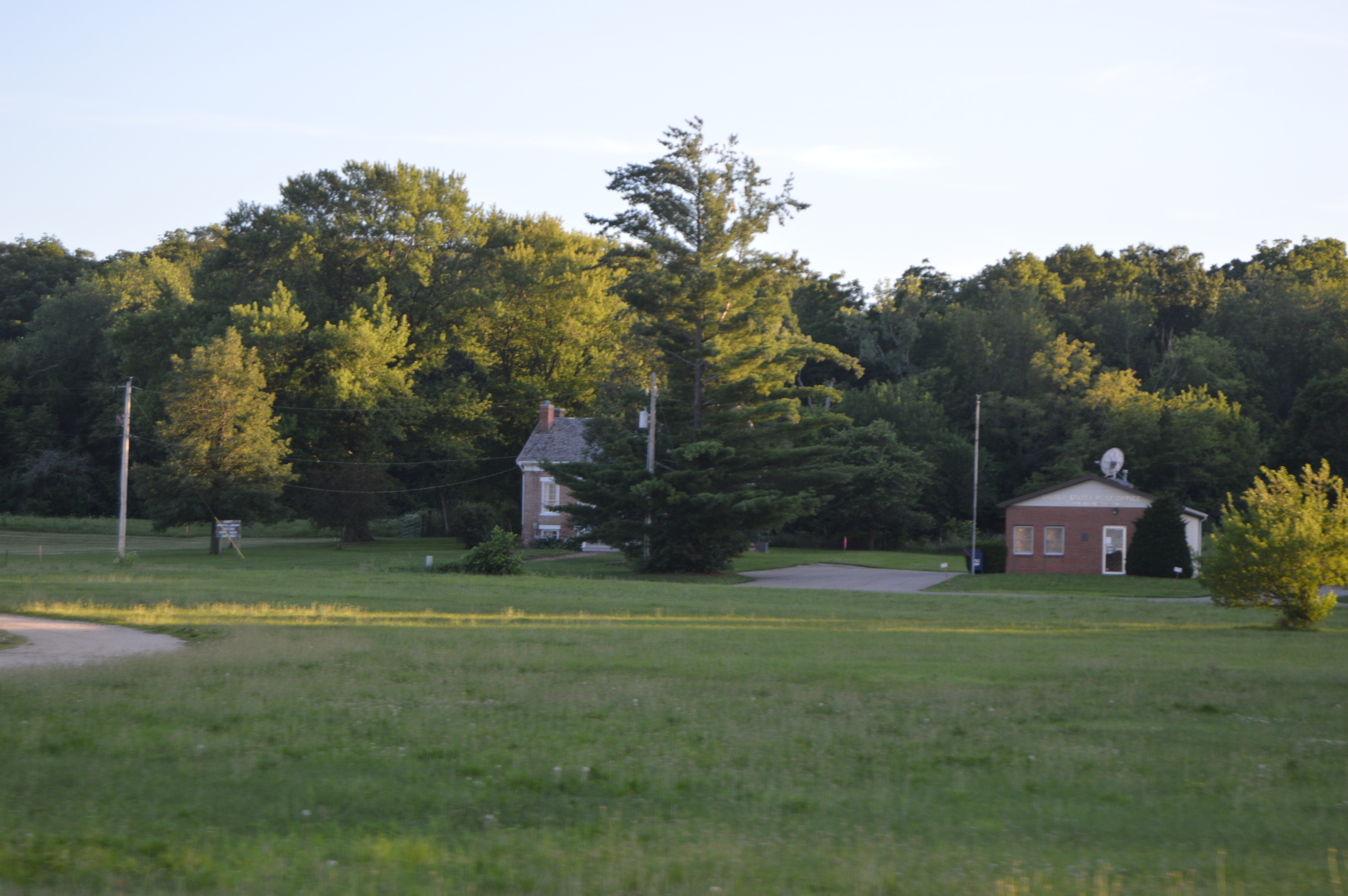
- Condit House (center) and U.S. Post Office (right)

- Location within Illinois Location within the United States
- Location: Center Street, off IL 29, Putnam, Illinois
- Coordinates: 41°10′53″N 89°23′46″W
- Area: less than one acre
- Built: 1849-50
- Architectural style: Greek Revival
- NRHP reference No.: 83000335
- Added to NRHP: September 16, 1983

The Cortland Condit House is a historic house located on Center Street in Putnam, Putnam County, Illinois. The house was built in 1849-50 by Cortland Condit. He was a farmer who came to Putnam County from New York in 1836. Condit founded the community of Putnam, which was originally named Condit in his honor. The Greek Revival house is the oldest brick building in Senachwine Township. The house's front entrance features a portico with square columns and gingerbread-style decoration, while the rear entrance has a brick archway. The house's windows are all six-over-six, as is common in Greek Revival homes. The gable roof features an entablature with cornice returns below its eaves.

The house was added to the National Register of Historic Places on September 16, 1983.
