= Gibault Catholic High School =

American high school in southern Illinois

Location
- 501 Columbia Avenue; Waterloo, Illinois 62298; United States; 38°30′39″N 90°9′24″W

Information
- Type: Private college-preparatory school
- Established: 1966; 60 years ago
- President: David Gregson
- Grades: 9–12
- Enrollment: 162 (2025–26)
- Colors: Maroon, navy, and white
- Nickname: Hawks
- Accreditation: NCA
- Newspaper: The Talon
- Tuition: $12,000 (non-parishioners) $9,600 (parishioners)
- Website: gibaulthawks.com

Gibault Catholic High School is a private, Roman Catholic high school in Waterloo, Illinois. It is part of the Diocese of Belleville.

== History ==
Gibault Catholic High School was established in 1946 as SS Peter and Paul School. It was given its current name in 1966 in honor of Fr. Pierre Gibault.

== Academics ==
Gibault Catholic High School has 10 departments: Business, English, Fine Arts, Math, Physical Education, Practical Arts, Religion, Science, Social Studies, and World Language. Gibault also offers college credits through the Saint Louis University's 1818 Advanced College Credit Program.

== Athletics ==
In 2023, the boys' basketball team won its first state championship, defeating Scales Mound for the Class 1A state title.

In 2013, the boys' baseball team won its first state championship, defeating Putnam County for the Class 1A state title. Later, they would go on to defeat Henry-Senachwine and secure the Class 1A state ritle in 2023 as well, winning 8–0.

Gibault won three consecutive state championships in soccer between 2005 and 2007.

== Notable alumni ==
- John Rheinecker — MLB baseball
