= Mark, Illinois =

Village of Mark
- Location of Mark in Putnam County, Illinois.
- Coordinates: 41°15′47″N 89°15′02″W
- Country: United States
- State: Illinois
- County: Putnam
- Township: Granville

Area
  - Total: 1.07 sq mi (2.76 km^{2})
  - Land: 1.07 sq mi (2.76 km^{2})
  - Water: 0 sq mi (0.00 km^{2})
- Elevation: 692 ft (211 m)

Population (2020)
  - Total: 519
  - Density: 487/sq mi (188.2/km^{2})
- Time zone: UTC-6 (CST)
  - Summer (DST): UTC-5 (CDT)
- ZIP codes: 61340
- FIPS code: 17-46981
- GNIS feature ID: 2399259
- Website: http://www.vil.mark.il.us/

Mark is a village in Putnam County, Illinois, United States. As of the 2020 census, Mark had a population of 519. It is part of the Ottawa Micropolitan Statistical Area. It maintains close ties to neighboring Granville, Illinois.

== History ==
The St. Paul Coal Company opened a shaft and founded the village in 1903. Superintendent Jame Cherry was in charge. The mine was sold to Prairie State Coal in 1928 and remained in operation until 1940.

== Geography ==
According to the 2010 census, the village has a total area of 1.13 square miles (2.9 km^{2}), all land.

== Demographics ==
Historical population
Census	Pop.	Note	%±
1910	1,025		—
1920	1,300		26.8%
1930	472		−63.7%
1940	529		12.1%
1950	449		−15.1%
1960	445		−0.9%
1970	379		−14.8%
1980	424		11.9%
1990	391		−7.8%
2000	491		25.6%
2010	555		13.0%
2020	519		−6.5%
U.S. Decennial Census

As of the census of 2000, there were 491 people, 192 households, and 139 families residing in the village. The population density was 604.9 inhabitants per square mile (233.6/km^{2}). There were 209 housing units at an average density of 257.5 per square mile (99.4/km^{2}). The racial makeup of the village was 98.57% White and 1.43% Native American. Hispanic or Latino of any race were 4.68% of the population.

There were 192 households, out of which 35.4% had children under the age of 18 living with them, 58.3% were married couples living together, 10.9% had a female householder with no husband present, and 27.6% were non-families. 25.0% of all households were made up of individuals, and 10.9% had someone living alone who was 65 years of age or older. The average household size was 2.56 and the average family size was 3.08. In the village, the population was spread out, with 27.7% under the age of 18, 6.9% from 18 to 24, 29.5% from 25 to 44, 20.0% from 45 to 64, and 15.9% who were 65 years of age or older. The median age was 37 years. For every 100 females, there were 87.4 males. For every 100 females age 18 and over, there were 87.8 males.

The median income for a household in the village was $45,208, and the median income for a family was $50,417. Males had a median income of $39,000 versus $18,750 for females. The per capita income for the village was $18,912. About 6.9% of families and 10.3% of the population were below the poverty line, including 17.5% of those under age 18 and none of those age 65 or over.

== Education ==
It is in the Putnam County Community Unit School District 535.
