= Chicago Prairie Football League =

High school football conference in Illinois

- Conference: IHSA
- Founded: 2023
- No. of teams: 5
- Region: Northern Illinois (Cook, DuPage, LaSalle, Livingston, and Will counties)

The Chicago Prairie Football League is a high school football only conference in northern Illinois. The conference participates in the Illinois High School Association. The conference includes five small public and three small private high schools, with enrollments between 150 and 950 students in Cook, DuPage, LaSalle, Livingston, and Will counties.

== Origins ==
The Chicago Prairie Football League has roots in the new Vermilion Valley Conference within the state of Illinois.

For football, the Vermilion Valley was divided into two divisions with six teams each, North and South. The north included Iroquois West and Watseka from the Vermilion Valley, Seneca and Dwight (coop) from the Tri-County Conference and Clifton Central and Momence High Schools from the River Valley Conference. Whereas the south included Bismarck-Henning-Rossville-Alvin, Salt Fork, Oakwood, Westville, Hoopeston Area (coop), and Georgetown-Ridge Farm (coop), all from the Vermilion Valley.

Due to travel time and distance between schools, the Chicago Prairie Football League formed with Dwight, St. Bede, Ottawa Marquette and Seneca coming from the Tri-County as well as Elmwood Park, Ridgewood and Westmont from the Metro Suburban and Walther Christian from the Northeastern Athletic to make up the newly formed 8-team conference tentatively named the Chicago Prairie Football League (CPFL).

In 2024–25, Elmwood Park and Ridgewood would leave the conference for the Upstate Eight Conference. Westmont would leave the conference becoming independent.

Locations of Chicago Prairie Football League Schools

== All-time membership ==
School	Location	County	Mascot	Colors	Other Sports Conference	Enrollment	IHSA Classes 1/2/3/4	IHSA Football Class	IHSA Football Coop
Dwight High School	Dwight, IL	Livingston	Trojans	Green, White	Tri-County	264.44	A/1A/1A	2A/3A	Yes
Marquette Academy	Ottawa, IL	LaSalle	Crusaders	Navy, Vegas Gold	Tri-County	154	A/1A/1A	1A	No
Seneca High School	Seneca, IL	LaSalle	Fighting Irish; Lady Irish	Green, White	Tri-County	428.5	1A/2A	2A/3A	No
St. Bede Academy	Peru, IL	LaSalle	Bruins	Green, White	Tri-County	282	A/1A/1A	1A	No
Walther Christian Academy	Melrose Park, IL	Cook	Broncos	Green, White	Northeastern Athletic	205	A/1A/1A	1A	No

Sources:IHSA Conferences, and IHSA Member Schools Directory
