= Robert Maclay (merchant) =

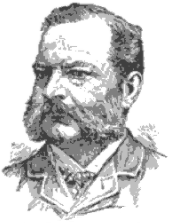
- Born: June 11, 1834; New York, New York
- Died: July 28, 1898 (aged 64); Elberon, New Jersey
- Resting place: Woodlawn Cemetery
- Occupations: Merchant, business executive, civic activist
- Spouse: Georgiana Barmore (m. 1868)
- Children: Robert Maclay (son)

Robert Maclay (1834–1898) was an American merchant, business executive, and civic activist. He engaged in real estate and banking in New York City and was appointed to various posts having to do with urban development.

== Biography ==
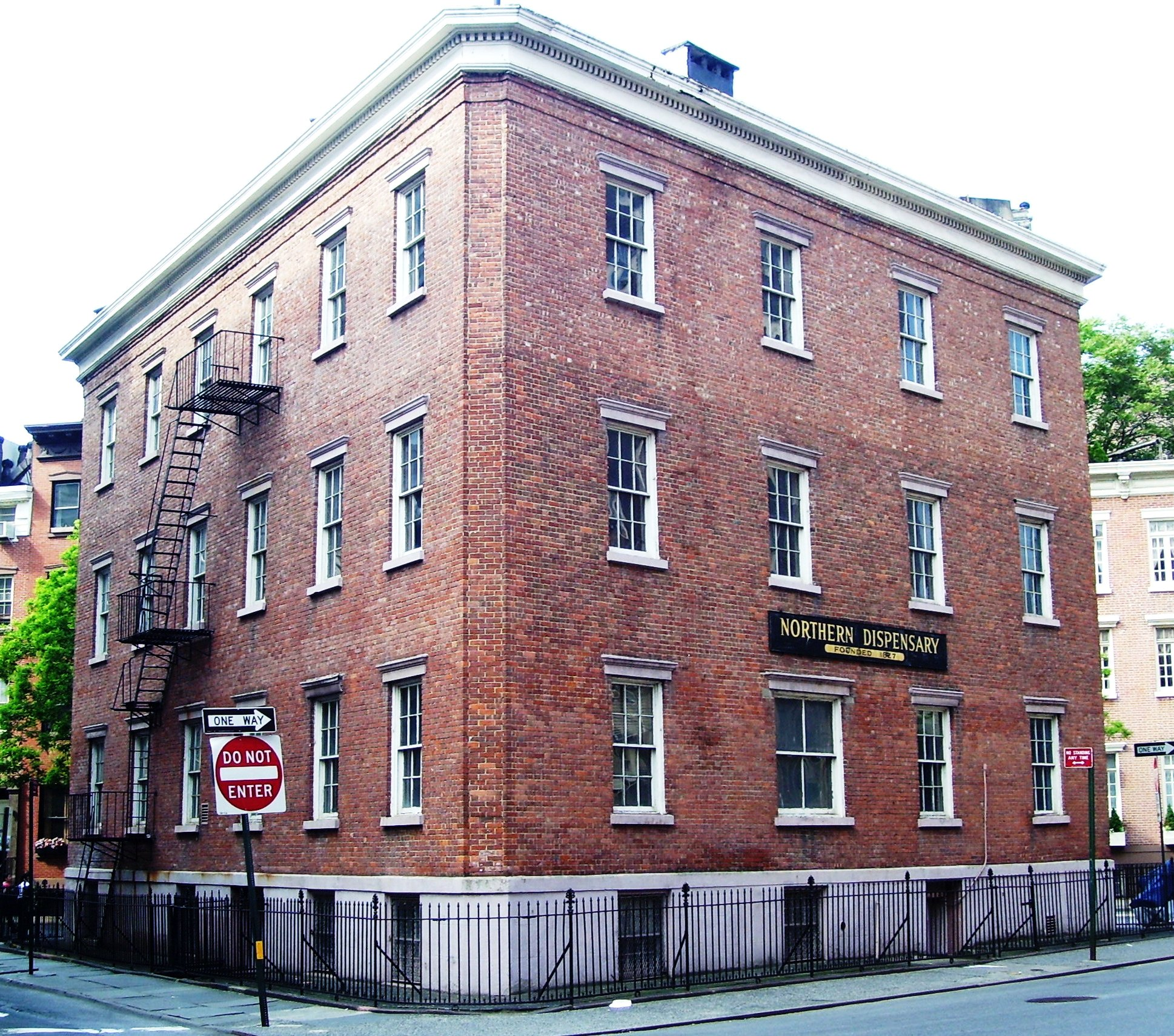
Northern Dispensary

Robert Maclay was a graduate of Judson College, Mount Palatine, Illinois.

He engaged in real estate and banking in New York City and was appointed to various posts related to urban development. Upon the death of his father-in-law, Alfred Barmore, he became president of Knickerbocker Ice Company, the largest ice company in the country.

On April 14, 1892, Maclay was appointed as a member of the Rapid Transit Commission. From 1891 until his death in 1898, he served as Chairman of the Building Commission for the New York City Board of Education. He presided as Chairman of the Building Commission when the American architect Charles B. J. Snyder was elected Superintendent of School Buildings in 1891.

Maclay was a Director of Bowery Savings Bank and a trustee of the Northern Dispensary. He was a trustee of the Madison Avenue Baptist Church and The Manhattan Club and was one of the incorporators of the New York Botanical Garden.

He was a member of New York Historical Society, the New York Athletic Club, the Metropolitan Club, the Grolier Club, the Down Town Association, the Brown Society of Glasgow, and the Advisory Committee of New York University.

== Family ==
Robert Maclay was born in New York City June 11, 1834, to the marriage of Robert Haldane Maclay, MD, and Eliza Maclay (née Labatut).

On May 18, 1868, he married Georgiana Barmore, daughter of Alfred Barmore, former president of the Knickerbocker Ice Company. Robert and Georgiana had two children:

- Alfred Barmore Maclay (1871–1944), the namesake of the Alfred B. Maclay Gardens State Park in Florida.
- Robert Maclay (born 1877). The younger Robert Maclay joined the board of the Consolidated National Bank on October 31, 1905.

The elder Robert Maclay died in Elberon, New Jersey July 28, 1898. He was buried at Woodlawn Cemetery in The Bronx.
