= Rockland Lake =

Rockland Lake may refer to:

== Places ==
- Rockland Lake, a lake in Rockland County, New York
- The unincorporated hamlet of Rockland Lake, New York, a former populated place located on the shores of Rockland Lake
- Rockland Lake State Park, a state park near the Hudson River in Rockland County, New York, within which Rockland Lake is located

== Other ==
- Rockland Lake ice, ice sourced from Rockland Lake largely by the Knickerbocker Ice Company, which dominated ice harvesting and distribution for New York City during the 19th century
