= Putnam County High School =

Public school in Granville, Illinois, US

Coordinates: 41.2659°N 89.2176°W

Location
- 402 East Silverspoon Avenue; Granville, (Putnam County), Illinois 61326; United States

Information
- Type: Public
- Established: 1966
- School district: 535
- Superintendent: Clayton Theisinger
- Principal: Dustin Schrank
- Staff: 22.50 (on an FTE basis)
- Enrollment: 236 (2023–24)
- Student to teacher ratio: 10.49
- Colors: Black and gold
- Athletics conference: Tri-County
- Mascot: Panther
- Nickname: Panthers

Putnam County High School is a public high school located at 402 East Silverspoon, Granville, Illinois. Its mascot is the Panthers, and its teams play in the Tri-County Conference. The superintendent is Clayton Theisinger and the principal is Dustin Schrank.

== Athletics ==
Putnam County competes in the Tri-County Conference for sports but football. Putnam County shares a football co-op with Hall High School, who competes in the Three Rivers Conference. The co-op started in the 2022-2023 school year.

Boys sports: baseball, basketball, cross country, football, golf, track and field, wrestling.

Girls sports: basketball, bowling, cross country, cheerleading, dance, golf, softball, track and field, volleyball, wrestling.
