= Clear Creek Meeting House =

Historic meetinghouse in Illinois, United States

- U.S. National Register of Historic Places
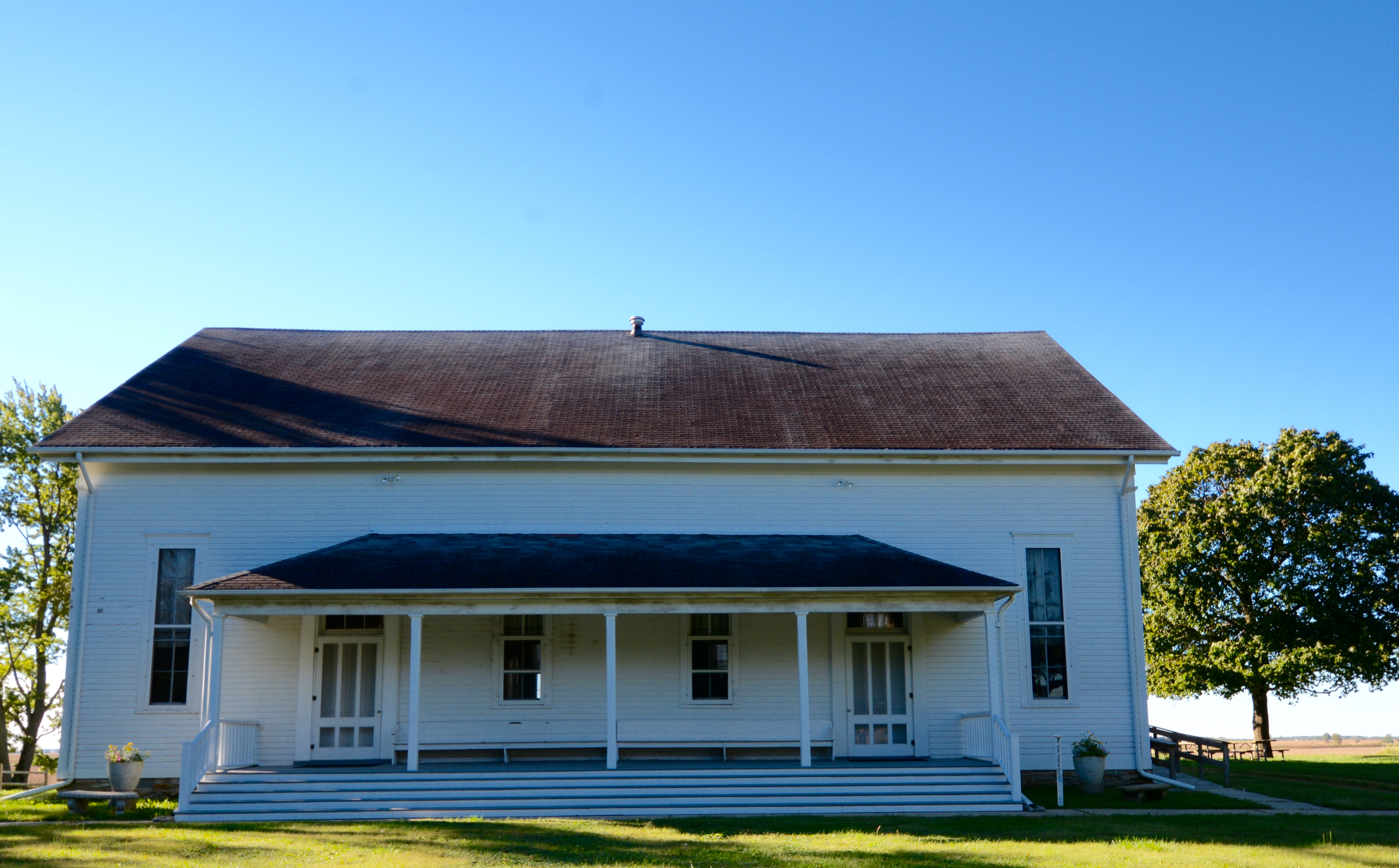

- Location within Illinois Location within the United States
- Location: 14365 N. 350th Ave., McNabb, Illinois
- Coordinates: 41°9′16″N 89°11′36″W
- Area: 1.9 acres (0.77 ha)
- Built: 1875
- Built by: Building Committee, Clear Creek Mtg.
- NRHP reference No.: 92001534
- Added to NRHP: November 5, 1992

The Clear Creek Meeting House is a Friends meeting house located at 14365 N. 350th Ave., southeast of McNabb, in Magnolia Township, Putnam County, Illinois. The meeting house was built in 1875 to house the Illinois Yearly Meeting of the Religious Society of Friends, also known as the Quakers. The Yearly Meeting was the westernmost annual meeting of the Hicksite Friends and attracted followers from several states. The meeting house also hosted the Clear Creek Monthly Meeting, which was attended by local Quakers. The building is typical of American Friends meeting houses; it features two square rooms with plain features both outside and inside. The lack of ornamentation was designed to reflect the Quaker tenet of simplicity. The meeting house is one of the few surviving western Quaker meeting houses which represent this tradition of Quaker architecture.

The meeting house was added to the National Register of Historic Places on November 5, 1992.

== See also ==
- Benjaminville Friends Meeting House and Burial Ground
