= Walnut Grove, Putnam County, Illinois =

Walnut Grove, Illinois
- Unincorporated community
- Location within Illinois
- Coordinates: 41°10′36″N 89°21′39″W
- Country: United States
- State: Illinois
- County: Putnam
- Elevation: 456 ft (139 m)
- Time zone: UTC-6 (Central (CST))
  - Summer (DST): UTC-5 (CDT)
- Area code: 309
- GNIS feature ID: 1719783

Walnut Grove is an unincorporated community in Putnam County, Illinois, United States, located on the western shore of Senachwine Lake.
