= Lowpoint-Washburn High School =

Lowpoint-Washburn Junior/Senior High School

Location
- 508 E. Walnut St. Washburn, Woodford County, Illinois 61570-7539; United States
- Coordinates: 40°55′10.1″N 89°16′51.3″W

Information
- School type: public, Public high school
- School district: Lowpoint-Washburn CUSD 21
- NCES District ID: 1740920
- Superintendent: Robert Bagby (interim)
- CEEB code: 144280
- NCES School ID: 174092004104
- Principal: Greg Geick
- Staff: 15.00 (FTE)
- Grades: 7–12
- Gender: Coeducational
- Enrollment: 158 (2023–2024)
- Average class size: 15.5 (grade 7); 8.0 (grade 8); 11.0 (grades 9–12)
- Student to teacher ratio: 10.53
- Classes offered: math, science, social science: 48 minutes/day each; English/languages: 96 minutes/day
- Campus: 4–12 building
- Area: 102 square miles (260 km^{2})
- Campus type: Village
- Colors: Maroon and gold
- Athletics conference: Tri-County
- Team name: Wildcats
- Illinois Learning Standards overall average: 71.7% meeting or exceeding
- Graduates (2010): 94.1%
- Website: www.lwcusd21.com//

Lowpoint-Washburn Junior/Senior High School is a public junior-senior high school in Washburn, Woodford County, Illinois. It handles seventh through twelfth grade and is in the same building as the Lowpoint-Washburn Community Unit School District 21 offices and Lowpoint-Washburn Middle School (fourth through sixth grades) about 0.3 miles (0.48 km) south of the Marshall County line.

The junior high school and senior high school are referred to separately by some sources and together in some sources, even from the school district. The Illinois School Report Card reports the junior-senior high school as a single school.

Its mascot is a wildcat, with their team names referred to as the Wildcats, and they compete as members of the Tri-County Conference.
