= Senachwine Lake =

Riparian lake in Illinois, U.S.

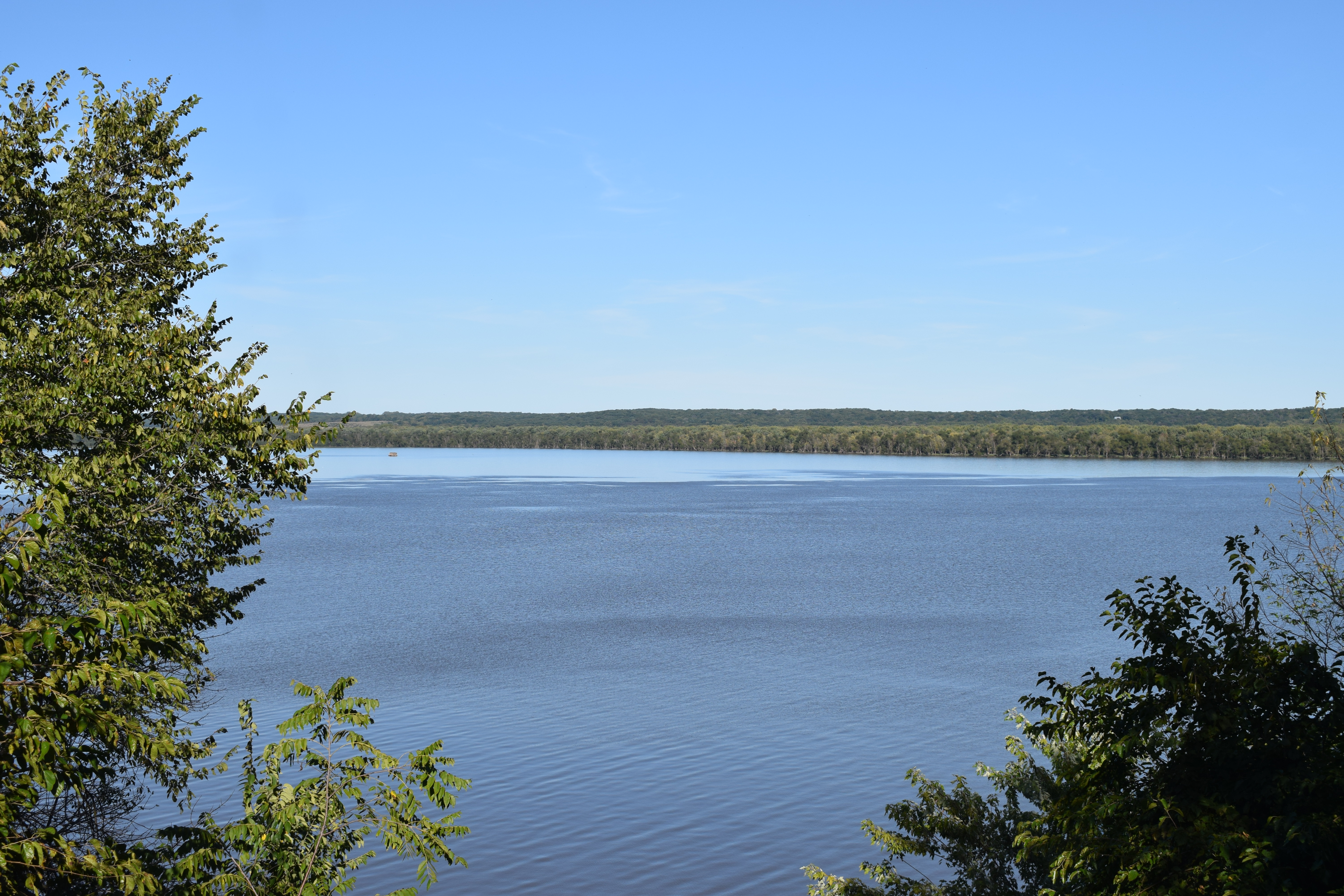
- Lake Senachwine, 2019

- Location within Illinois Location within the United States
- Location: Putnam / Marshall counties, Illinois, United States
- Coordinates: 41°10′30″N 89°20′48″W
- Basin countries: United States
- Surface area: 3,324 acres (1,345 ha)
- Surface elevation: 439 ft (134 m)

Senachwine Lake is a 3,324-acre (13.45 km^{2}) riparian lake that forms part of the valley of the Illinois River. It is located in Putnam and Marshall counties, Illinois. Its elevation is 439 feet (134 m) above sea level. Senachwine Lake is connected by a shallow channel to adjacent Goose Lake, also a backwater lake of the Illinois River.

== Glacial relic ==
The drainage of glacial meltwater at the conclusion of the Wisconsin glacial period left the lower Illinois River valley, including the Senachwine Lake area, as a broad ribbon of relatively impermeable clay and silt bordered by low bluffs.

During the post-glacial springtimes, as the climate of Illinois grew warmer, floods caused by snowmelt tended to fill sections of the valley faster than it could be drained during the rest of the year. Eventually the Illinois River became a braided, slow-moving alluvial river bordered by a string of riverside lakes and wetlands. Senachwine Lake is one of these backwater lakes.

== Backwater lake and fish ==
During prehistoric and early historic times, backwater lakes bordering the Illinois such as Senachwine Lake became highly productive areas for fishing. Native American sites such as Dickson Mounds pay tribute to the civilizations founded on fishing, waterfowling, and the gathering of wetland plants and animals.

During early American frontier years, wetland zones were key areas in the fur trade. Commercial fishing in Lake Senachwine continued until 1900–1910, when toxic waste was injected into the Illinois River through the newly dug Chicago Sanitary and Ship Canal.

== Remediation ==
Efforts to remediate Senachwine Lake have concentrated on mandates to clean up sewage discharges into the Illinois River drainage, and efforts to cut the erosion of Illinois topsoil into the lake and river. Adjacent areas of Putnam County are vulnerable to erosion, as they are heavily cultivated for corn and soybeans.

Senachwine Lake is a local favorite for recreation, with a boat ramp located near Putnam off Illinois Route 29. Fish-eating waterfowl, including egrets, great blue herons, and bald eagles, have returned to the lake.
