= Judson College (Mount Palatine, Illinois) =

Former school in Mount Palatine, Illinois

Coordinates: 42.059825°N 88.290150°W

Judson College, in Mount Palatine, Illinois, United States, was founded as Mount Palatine Academy in 1846, under the auspices of the Baptist denomination. It was chartered by the state of Illinois as a university in the winter of 1850–51, then led by its first president in 1853, and sold under fiscal duress by the Sheriff in 1860.

When the Illinois Central Railroad was built, stopping in Tonica, Illinois, six miles away from Mount Palatine, rapid decline in enrollment ensued at Judson. This institution subsequently became unprofitable and was sold in 1860 to the Catholic community in the vicinity. The sale was conditional on the sole building and property be permanently maintained as a school. Failure to do so would cause the property to revert to the original owners.

Judson College has never been connected to the present-day institution founded under the same name, now called Judson University, an evangelical Christian liberal arts university located in Elgin, Illinois, founded in 1963.

== Alumni ==
- Robert Maclay (1834–1898) — Merchant for New York City, business executive, and New York City politically appointed urban development executive
