= Midland Community Unit School District =

School district in Marshall County, Illinois, United States

Address
- 901 Hilltop Drive Sparland, Illinois, 61565; United States

District information
- Type: Public
- Grades: PreK–12
- NCES District ID: 1700126

Students and staff
- Students: 698

Other information
- Website: www.midland-7.org

Midland Community Unit School District #7 is a school district headquartered in Sparland, Illinois.

It operates Midland Elementary School, Midland Middle School, and Midland High School.

== History ==
The district formed through an act of consolidation circa 1996. Rolf Sivertsen served as the Midland CUSD superintendent until July 1, 2016, as he moved to Canton, Illinois.

In 2016 Gary L. Smith of the Journal Star wrote that there were "sometimes bitter geographic divisions" and cited a case where, in an election to build a new school in Lacon, residents of Lacon gave "overwhelming support" but that people in Sparland and Varna "strongly opposed" the measure. Overall 55% of participants voted in favor in 2016, causing the measure to pass.

On May 16, 2016, L. William "Bill" Wrenn was selected as the superintendent. Wrenn served in this capacity until he died in January 2020. Wrenn planned to finish his term at the end of the 2019–2020 school year.
