= Mount Palatine, Illinois =

- Unincorporated community
- Location within Illinois Location within the United States
- Coordinates: 41°11′33″N 89°09′47″W
- Country: United States
- State: Illinois
- Counties: Putnam, LaSalle
- Townships: Magnolia, Hope
- Elevation: 748 ft (228 m)
- Time zone: UTC-6 (Central (CST))
  - Summer (DST): UTC-5 (CDT)
- Area code: 815
- GNIS feature ID: 414035

Mount Palatine is an unincorporated community in LaSalle and Putnam counties in the U.S. state of Illinois. The community is located about 2 miles (3.2 km) east of McNabb. The town once had shops and a small college, but declined when the Illinois Central chose a location far to the East. Today, the cemetery is a prairie nature preserve.

== See also ==
- Judson College, Mount Palatine, Illinois
