= Tonica, Illinois =

Village in LaSalle County, Illinois

- Village
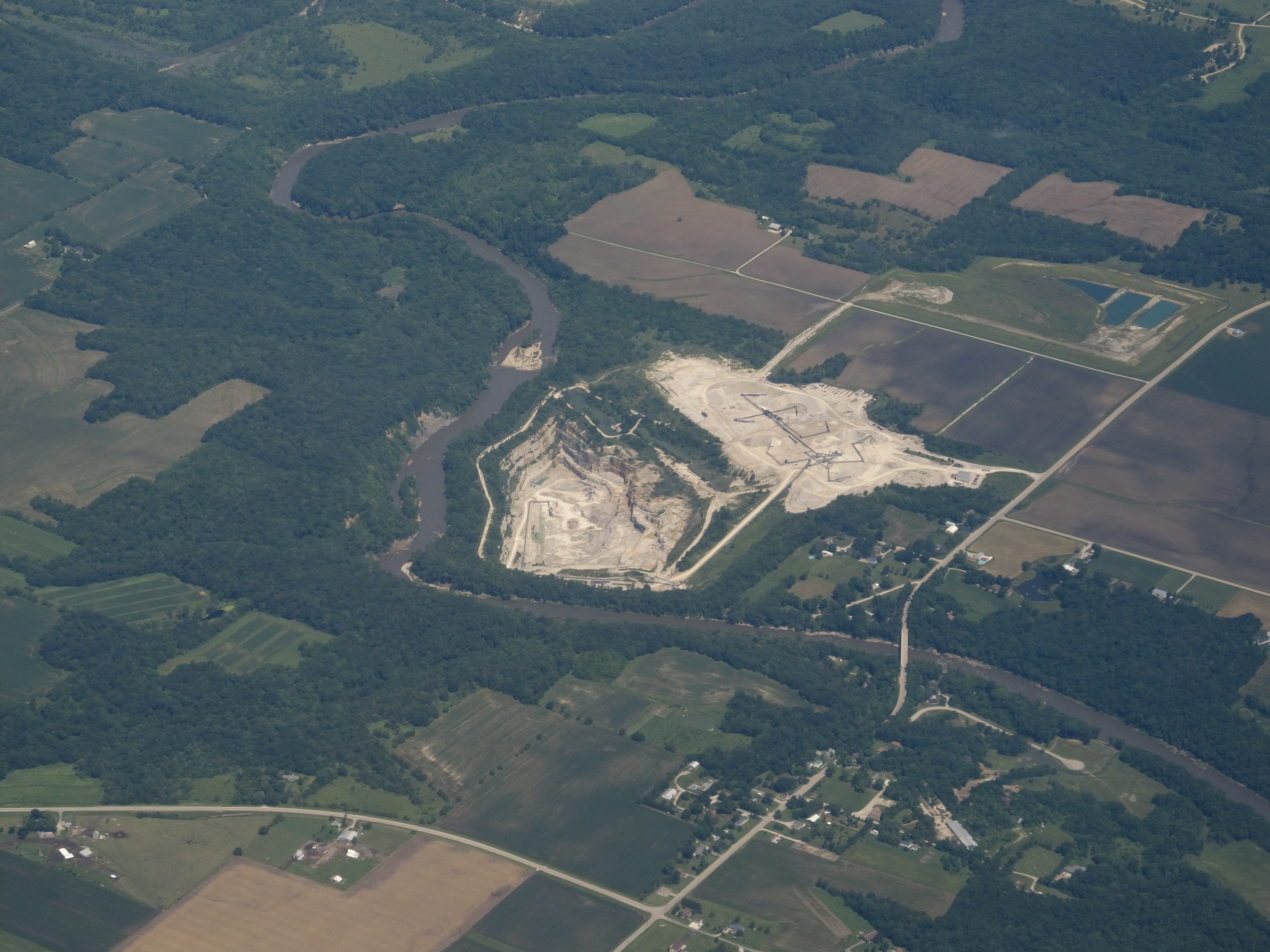
- Aerial view of Tonica

- Location in LaSalle County, Illinois
- Coordinates: 41°12′57″N 89°04′12″W
- Country: United States
- State: Illinois
- County: LaSalle
- Township: Eden

Area
  - Total: 1.36 sq mi (3.53 km^{2})
  - Land: 1.36 sq mi (3.53 km^{2})
  - Water: 0 sq mi (0.00 km^{2})
- Elevation: 666 ft (203 m)

Population (2020)
  - Total: 749
  - Density: 549.4/sq mi (212.12/km^{2})
- Time zone: UTC-6 (CST)
  - Summer (DST): UTC-5 (CDT)
- ZIP code: 61370
- Area code: 815
- FIPS code: 17-75718
- GNIS feature ID: 2399993
- Website: www.tonicavillage.com

Tonica is a village in LaSalle County, Illinois, United States. The population was 749 at the 2020 census, down from 768 at the 2010 census. It is part of the Ottawa Micropolitan Statistical Area.

== History ==
Tonica was originally a small hamlet called Point Republic. The village was founded by Andrew West, the local agent for the Illinois Central Railroad. The tracks arrived May 23, 1853. Tonica was first incorporated on April 3, 1859, then reincorporated on August 16, 1873. The incorporation was certified on October 16, 1901.

Tonica derives its name from the Tunica people that West learned about while growing up in New York State. West likewise named many of the streets in the town after Native American tribes and people.

== Geography ==
Tonica is located in western LaSalle County and Illinois Route 251 passes through the center of the village, leading north 9 miles (14 km) to Peru and south 12 miles (19 km) to Wenona. Interstate 39 passes through the west side of the village, with access from Exit 48 (N 20th Road). I-39 leads north 10 miles (16 km) to Interstate 80 in LaSalle and south 48 miles (77 km) to Interstate 55 at Normal.

According to the 2020 census, Tonica has a total area of 1.36 square miles (3.52 km^{2}), all land.

== Demographics ==
Historical population
Census	Pop.	Note	%±
1880	504		—
1890	473		−6.2%
1900	497		5.1%
1910	483		−2.8%
1920	439		−9.1%
1930	500		13.9%
1940	510		2.0%
1950	585		14.7%
1960	750		28.2%
1970	821		9.5%
1980	695		−15.3%
1990	715		2.9%
2000	685		−4.2%
2010	768		12.1%
2020	749		−2.5%
U.S. Decennial Census

As of the census of 2020, there were 749 people, 328 households, and 207 families residing in the village. The population density was 550.7 inhabitants per square mile (212.6/km^{2}). There were 331 housing units at an average density of 243.4 per square mile (94.0/km^{2}). The racial makeup of the village was 86.78% White, 0.13% Native American, 0.53% Asian,4.94% from other races, and 0.61% from two or more races. Hispanic or Latino of any race were 9.48% of the population.

There were 328 households, out of which 31.4% had children under the age of 18 living with them, 47.9% were married couples living together, 10.4% had a female householder with no husband present, and 36.9% were non-families. 31.7% of all households were made up of individuals, and 6.7% had someone living alone who was 65 years of age or older. The average household size was 2.37 and the average family size was 2.93.

In the village, the population was spread out, with 20.8% under the age of 18, 11.1% from 18 to 24, 24.8% from 25 to 44, 24.0% from 45 to 64, and 12.1% who were 65 years of age or older. The median age was 41.4 years. For every 100 females, there were 112.3 males. For every 100 females age 18 and over, there were 111.3 males.

The median income for a household in the village was $52,206, and the median income for a family was $71,750. Males had a median income of $39,265 versus $32,500 for females. The per capita income for the village was $27,672. About 9.7% of families and 14.4% of the population were below the poverty line, including 21.0% of those under age 18 and 10.6% of those age 65 or over.

== Education ==
The village has its own grade school, Tonica Grade School (K-8).

== Notable people ==
- Arthur R. Hall, former University of Illinois football player and head coach

== See also ==
- Mount Palatine, Illinois, an unincorporated community, six miles away from Tonica
- Judson College (Mount Palatine, Illinois), disestablished in the 1860s
