= Marquette Academy =

Location
- 1000 Paul Street (High School); 1110 LaSalle Street (Elementary); 1110 LaSalle Street (Early Education); Ottawa, Illinois 61350; United States; 41°21′1″N 88°50′22″W

Information
- Type: parochial, private
- Motto: Catholic Education since 1859
- Denomination: Roman Catholic
- Established: 1859
- Founder: Sisters of Mercy
- Authority: Diocese of Peoria
- Oversight: Diocese of Peoria
- Superintendent: Dr. Jerry Sanderson (Interim)
- President: Msgr. Philip Halfacre
- Dean: Mr. Michael Hall, Mr. Todd Glade
- Principal: Brooke A. Rick
- Chaplain: Fr. Wilson
- Staff: 26
- Faculty: 51
- Grades: Pre-K–12
- Gender: co-educational
- Campus: 2 Buildings
- Campus type: Closed
- Colors: Navy Blue; Vegas Gold
- Slogan: We are more than a school, we are MARQUETTE.
- Fight song: Marquette Loyalty
- Athletics conference: Tri County, Northeastern Athletic (football only)
- Mascot: Crusader
- Team name: (Lady) Crusaders
- Rival: St. Bede Academy Serena Township High School
- Accreditation: North Central Association of Colleges and Schools
- Newspaper: The Shield
- Yearbook: Memorare
- Website: www.marquetteacademy.net

Marquette Academy is a private, Roman Catholic high school in Ottawa, Illinois. It is located in the Roman Catholic Diocese of Peoria.

== History ==
Marquette High School was originally known as St. Joseph's. It began teaching grade school and high school level courses in 1859. The name was later changed to St. Xavier Academy in 1900 when the school became an all-girls high school.

In 1946, the school became a co-ed facility known as Ottawa Catholic High School. This only lasted three years, when the name was changed to Marquette High School in honor of Fr. Jacques Marquette.

The original St. Xavier's building served as the high school facility until 1991, when it was torn down. A new addition was built after the demolition to replace the original building and was connected to the wing that was built in 1949 when the school became a co-ed high school.

In the Fall of 2010, Marquette High School combined with the two privately funded Catholic Grade Schools in Ottawa, St. Patrick and St. Columba, and formed Marquette Academy, which house Pre-K through twelfth grades in three separate buildings. The high school campus remained the same, kindergarten through eighth grades are in the former St. Columba building, while preschool is in the early childhood center at St. Patrick's.

In the Fall of 2015, the early childhood and elementary combined into one building. They are now both housed at the former St. Columba building.

== Supporting parishes ==
The following parishes are feeder parishes to Marquette Academy. Their pastors serve as members of the Pastor's Board.

St. Columba, Ottawa; St. Patrick's, Ottawa; St. Francis, Ottawa; St. Mary's, Grand Ridge; St. Michael's, Streator; St. Joseph's, Marseilles; St. Patrick's, Seneca; St. Patrick's, Ransom; St. Theresa's, Earlville; St. Joseph's, Wedron

== Athletics ==
Marquette Academy High School is a member of the Tri-County Conference and the Northeastern Athletic Conference for football, and currently competes in 12 sports. The Marquette football team recently went undefeated in their new conference (9-0). They won the first round of the IHSA playoffs against Chicago Luther North (44-8). In the second round the crusaders lost to Forreston in overtime (35-34).

Boys Sports - Football, Baseball, Basketball, Cross Country, Track & Field, Golf, Bowling, Wrestling

Girls Sports - Volleyball, Softball, Basketball, Cross Country, Track & Field, Poms, Bowling, Cheerleading

== Notable alumni ==
- Bob McGrath is an actor and singer best known for his portrayal of Bob on Sesame Street.
- Guy Hoffman is a former professional baseball player.
- Bob Guyette is a former pro basketball player.
