= Woodland High School (Illinois) =

Location
- 5800 E 3000 North Rd. Streator, Illinois; United States; 41°3′38.1″N 88°49′3.3″W

Information
- Type: Public
- Faculty: 14.00 (FTE)
- Grades: Pre-12
- Enrollment: 144 (2022-23)
- Student to teacher ratio: 10.29
- Color
- Mascot: Warrior
- Website: www.woodland5.net

Woodland High School is a small public high school located at 5800 E 3000 North Road in Streator, Illinois, USA. Its athletic teams play in the Tri-County Conference. Its mascot is the Warriors.
