= Midland High School (Illinois) =

School in Varna, Illinois, United States

Location
- 1830 Illinois State Route 17; Varna, Marshall County, Illinois 61375; United States; 41.02700°N 89.2911°W

Information
- Type: Comprehensive Public High School
- School district: Midland Community Unit School District
- Superintendent: Jeremy Gauwitz
- Principal: Jordan Farris
- Faculty: 13.00 (FTE)
- Grades: 9–12
- Enrollment: 195 (2023–2024)
- Student to teacher ratio: 15.00
- Campus type: Rural
- Colors: Dark Green, Silver, Black
- Athletics conference: Tri-County
- Mascot: Timberwolves
- Website: Midland School District

Midland High School (MHS), also known as Varna Midland, is a public four-year high school located at 1830 Illinois State Route 17 outside of Varna, Illinois, a village in Marshall County, Illinois, in the Midwestern United States. MHS serves the communities of Varna, Lacon, and Sparland. The campus is located 30 miles northeast of Peoria, Illinois, and serves a mixed village and rural residential community.

== Academics ==
Potential reference/citation:

Midland High School offers academics in all of the major fields of study (Math, Science, English, and Literature) as well as other, more diverse areas of academia.

=== Math ===
Students are offered multiple levels of mathematics classes. These classes include Pre-Algebra, Algebra I, Geometry, Algebra II, Advanced Math, Advanced Placement Calculus, and Physics.

=== Science ===
The science department has at least one newly upgraded science lab/lecture classroom, featuring a Smart Board and high-tech lab tables. Courses include: Earth Science, Physical Science, Biology, Chemistry, Anatomy and Physiology, and Advanced Placement Biology.

=== English/Literature ===
Midland's English/Literature department offers classes which include English I, English II, English II, and English IV.

=== History ===
Students are offered a variety of history courses as well. These classes include: Geography, World History, and American History (required to graduate).

=== Agriculture ===
The agriculture department of Midland High School partners with Midland's FFA group to compete in FFA competitions and bring home awards based on the students' broad and detailed understanding of the agricultural world around them.

=== Foreign Language ===
Midland offers one foreign language through the school: Spanish. The department offers four levels of the language course as well as a Spanish Club for extracurricular learning.

=== Visual Arts & Technology ===
This school offers two full computer labs (one used as a classroom setting), a half lab in the media center, and laptops available for classroom teachers to check out for specific classes. The technology classes are the Newspaper and Yearbook classes (called "Technology Applications" in the class catalog).

=== Music ===
Midland offers both choirs and bands to students at the school. Two levels of choir are offered: Chamber Choir for women's voices in a small ensemble setting and a class choir in a smaller time period for any type of voice. The choir frequently goes on tour (they visit New York City every 4 years where they perform) and integrate music theory and world music into their lessons. The band program is offered one hour a day but includes many extracurriculars. Students in band play for the basketball games in the winter.

== Athletics ==
Midland High School competes in the Tri-County Conference and is a member school in the Illinois High School Association. Their mascot is the Timberwolves, with school colors of dark green, silver, and black. The school has no state championships on record in team athletics and activities. Due to their small enrollment, MHS coops with nearby Henry-Senachwine High School for Boys and Girls Cross Country, and Boys and Girls Track and Field. Midland also offers Scholastic bowl that also competes in the Little Tri County, as well as golf, baseball, basketball, girls basketball, softball, bass fishing, and volleyball.

== History ==
Midland High School was formed out of the 1995 consolidation of Sparland High School and Mid-County High School (a successor of the Varna High School and Lacon High School consolidation after World War II). Surrounding communities may have also possessed high schools at some time which were consolidated into the current MHS (Potential reference/citation:).
