= Roanoke-Benson High School =

Location
- 208 West High Street; Roanoke, Illinois; United States; 40°48′05″N 89°11′57″W

Information
- Type: Public
- School district: Roanoke-Benson CUSD #60
- Principal: Michael Tresnak
- Teaching staff: 16.10 (on FTE basis)
- Grades: 9 to 12
- Enrollment: 143 (2023–2024)
- Student to teacher ratio: 8.88
- Colors: Black and white
- Athletics conference: Tri-County Conference
- Mascot: Rockets
- Nickname: RB
- Team name: Rockets
- Website: www.rb60.com

Roanoke-Benson High School is a comprehensive high school located at 208 West High Street, in Roanoke, Illinois. The school is a member of the Tri-County Conference, and compete under the name Rockets.
