= Charles T. Wardlaw =

American civic leader

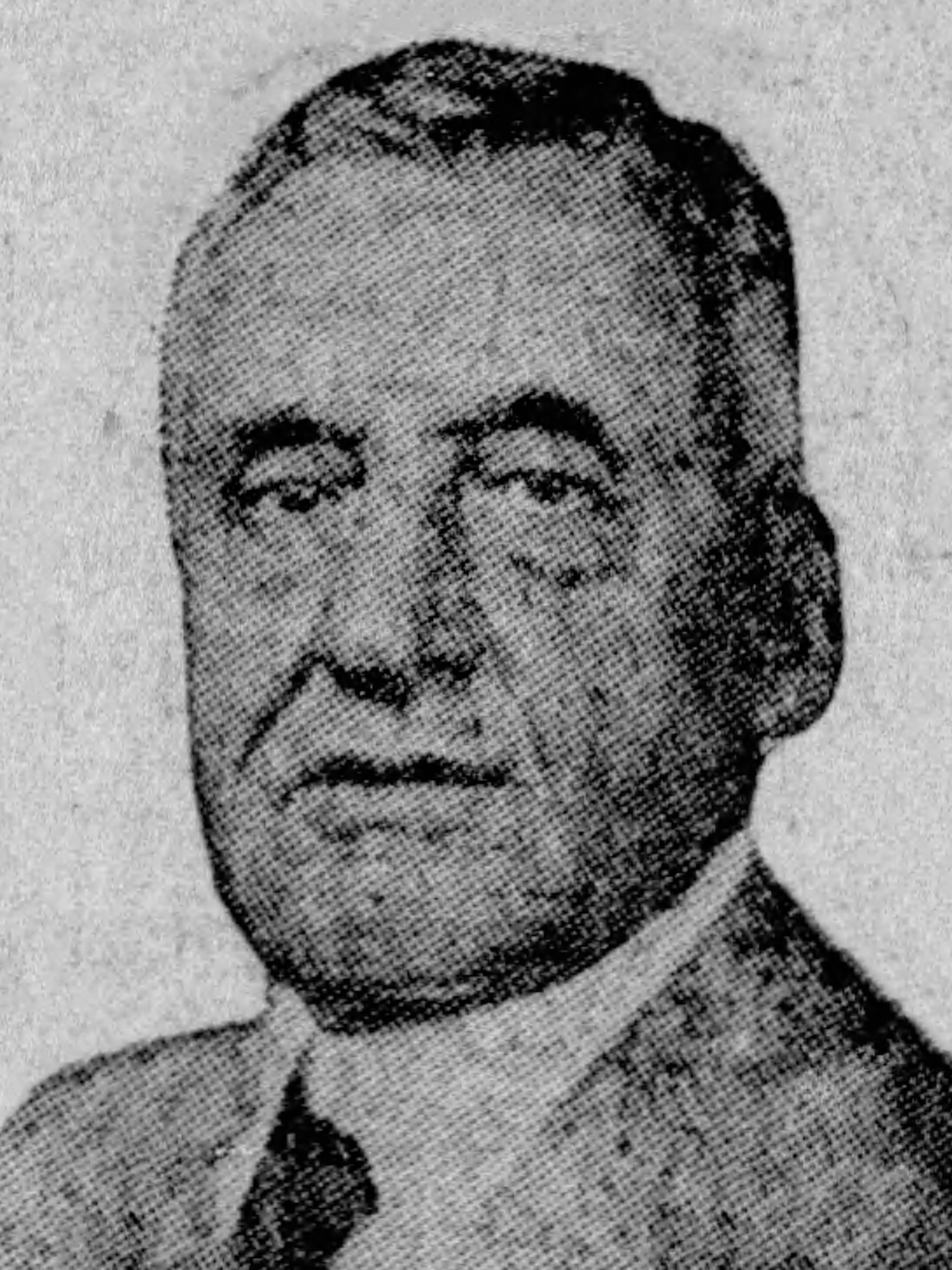
- Wardlaw in 1923
- Born: June 30, 1858; Granville, Illinois United States
- Died: February 24, 1928 (aged 69); Los Angeles, California
- Occupation(s): Politician, banker and financier
- Spouse: Pamella R. Wardlaw
- Children: 2

Charles T. Wardlaw (June 30, 1858 – February 24, 1928) was an American politician and financier. He was a politician in Dawes County, Nebraska, and a financier and civic leader in Los Angeles, California.

== Early life ==
Wardlaw was born on June 30, 1858, in Granville, Illinois, to A. F. and Nancy J. Wardlaw.

== Career ==
In 1900, Wardlaw was county clerk in Dawes County, Nebraska, where he was also chairman of the county Democratic Committee. He was also affiliated with a newspaper there called The Chadronian.

Wardlaw was in the railroad service, being at different times an agent, a dispatcher and freight and passenger agent. He was a manager of the "great California-Mexico Ranch" and then moved to the San Fernando Valley in 1919, where he became a banker and a financier. Along with Harry Chandler and M.H. Sherman, he was a subdivider of the first building tract in Van Nuys, California.

== Personal life and death ==
He died of a heart attack in his home on Van Nuys Boulevard on February 24, 1928, being survived by his wife, Pamella R. Wardlaw, a son, John Richardson Wardlaw, and a daughter, Mrs. Eva Wardlaw. Day.
