= DePue High School =

Location
- 204 Pleasant Street, PO Box 800; DePue, Bureau County, Illinois 61322; United States; 41.3230°N 89.3069°W

Information
- Type: Comprehensive Public High School
- School district: DePue Community Unit School District 103
- Principal: Susan Bruner
- Teaching staff: 8.80 (FTE)
- Grades: 9–12
- Enrollment: 98 (2023–2024)
- Average class size: 30
- Student to teacher ratio: 11.14
- Campus type: Rural, fringe
- Colors: Blue, orange
- Mascot: Little Giants
- Website: DePue Schools

DePue High School, or DHS, is a public four-year high school located at 204 Pleasant Street in De Pue, Illinois, a village in Bureau County, Illinois, in the Midwestern United States. DHS serves the community and surrounding area of DePue. The campus is located 25 miles west of Ottawa, Illinois, and serves a mixed village and rural residential community. The village is 89% Hispanics/Latino.

== Academics ==
Potential reference/citation:

== Athletics ==
DePue High School, a member of the Tri-County Conference, and a member school in the Illinois High School Association. Their mascot is the Little Giants, with school colors of blue and orange. The school has no state championships on record in team athletics and activities.

Although DHS' possesses a small enrollment, they do not coop for sports, instead focusing on one sport per season: In the fall, Boys Soccer and Girls Volleyball; in the winter, Boys and Girls Basketball; in the spring, Boys and Girls Track and field and Girls Soccer.

== History ==
DePue High School has no known consolidations in the recent past. Surrounding communities may have possessed high schools at some time which were consolidated into the current DHS. Potential reference/citation:

The School was visited by the governor of Illinois on the 22nd of July 2004 to promote the No Child Left Behind Act.
