= Henry-Senachwine High School =

Location
- 1023 College Avenue; Henry, Marshall County, Illinois 61537; United States; 41.1157°N 89.3679°W

Information
- Type: Comprehensive Public High School
- School district: Henry-Senachwine Community Unit School District
- Principal: Brock Zinke
- Teaching staff: 17.55 (FTE)
- Grades: 9–12
- Enrollment: 152 (2023–2024)
- Student to teacher ratio: 8.66
- Campus type: Small city
- Colors: Red, Black
- Athletics conference: Tri-County
- Mascot: Mallards
- Website: Henry-Senachwine High School

Henry-Senachwine High School, or HSHS, is a public four-year high school located at 1023 College Street in Henry, Illinois, a village in Marshall County, Illinois, in the Midwestern United States. HSHS serves the communities of Henry and Putnam. The campus is located 30 miles northeast of Peoria, Illinois, and serves a mixed village and rural residential community. Their rivals are the Midland Timberwolves.

Since July 1, 2001, the school is one of three options for students of Bradford Community Unit School District 1, which, after that date, no longer covered high school.

== Academics ==
In 2023 75% of the graduating class enrolled in college.

Potential reference/citation:

== Athletics ==
Henry-Senachwine High School competes in the Tri-County Conference and is a member school in the Illinois High School Association. Their mascot is the Mallards, with school colors of red and black. The school has no state championships on record in team athletics and activities. Due to their small enrollment, HSHS coops with nearby Midland High School for Boys and Girls Cross Country, and Boys and Girls Track and Field.

== History ==
Henry-Senachwine High School was formed out of the 1947 consolidation of Henry (Township) High School and Senachwine (Township) High School in Putnam, Illinois. Henry participates in the Tri-county conference and under the late coach Steve Self they had multiple formidable seasons and in his second stint with the team he had a 100-69 record.

== Notable alumni ==
- Brian Allard, Former MLB player (Texas Rangers, Seattle Mariners)
