= Florid, Illinois =

- Unincorporated community
- Location within Illinois
- Coordinates: 41°13′43″N 89°16′51″W
- Country: United States
- State: Illinois
- County: Putnam
- Elevation: 699 ft (213 m)
- Time zone: UTC-6 (Central (CST))
  - Summer (DST): UTC-5 (CDT)
- Area code: 309
- GNIS feature ID: 408472

Florid is an unincorporated community in Putnam County, Illinois, United States, located about 4 miles (6.4 km) southeast of Hennepin.

== History ==
Florid was founded in1835. The early settlement contained stores, churches, a post office, a school, and a "cluster of dwellings". By the 1880s, Florid had "fallen into decay".
