= Putnam, Illinois =

- Unincorporated community
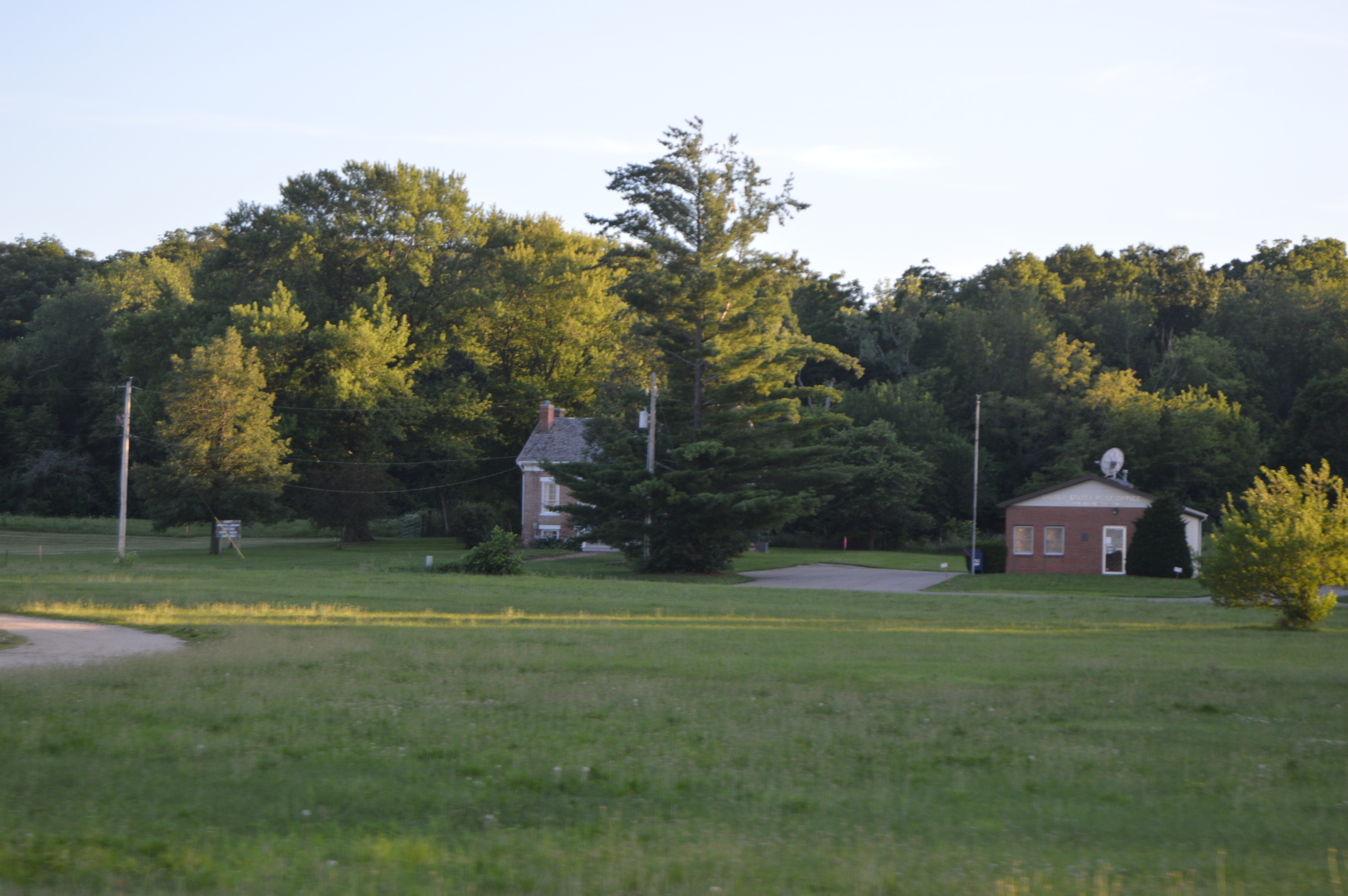
- Historic Cortland Condit House, now a library (center), and U.S. Post Office (right)

- Location within Illinois
- Coordinates: 41°11′06″N 89°23′47″W
- Country: United States
- State: Illinois
- County: Putnam
- Elevation: 518 ft (158 m)
- Time zone: UTC-6 (Central (CST))
  - Summer (DST): UTC-5 (CDT)
- ZIP Code: 61560
- Area codes: 815 & 779
- GNIS feature ID: 416295

Putnam is an unincorporated community in Putnam County, Illinois, United States. The community is located to the west of Senachwine Lake along Illinois Route 29, north of Henry. This village of some 100 people was originally called Senachwine, after the great Indian Chief Senachwine.

Putnam is the only village in Putnam County on the west side of the Illinois River. It had an 8-year Grade School, whose students graduated to go to Henry-Senachwine High School in nearby Henry, Illinois, which had a gymnasium converted from an earlier Church. Currently, there is no open school in the village. In the mid-1900s the town also had a Library, Auto Mechanic's Garage, Grocery Store, Post Office, community Town Hall, a non-denominational Christian Church, a Trucking Company, Diner, and a Fire Station, along with the Grain Elevator and Church which still exist. In later years a large Auction House was located on the south side of town, along with a Convenient store gas station. The Putnam Christian Church celebrated its 150 anniversary in the summer of 2016.

Locals use the conveniently located hill next to the church to sled in the winter. The town's main attraction, "The Swimmin' Hole", is located just north of the town.
