= Senachwine Township, Putnam County, Illinois =

Coordinates: 41°11′27″N 89°23′59″W

Senachwine Township
- Township
- Location in Putnam County

- Putnam County's location in Illinois
- Country: United States
- State: Illinois
- County: Putnam
- Established: November 8, 1855

Area
  - Total: 40.07 sq mi (103.8 km^{2})
  - Land: 31.86 sq mi (82.5 km^{2})
  - Water: 8.21 sq mi (21.3 km^{2}) 20.49%

Population (2010)
  - Estimate (2016): 712
  - Density: 23.4/sq mi (9.0/km^{2})
- Time zone: UTC-6 (CST)
  - Summer (DST): UTC-5 (CDT)
- FIPS code: 17-155-68627

Senachwine Township is located in Putnam County, Illinois. As of the 2010 census, its population was 745 and it contained 651 housing units.

Senachwine is named for an Indian chief whose hunting grounds and home were located in the township.

== Geography ==
According to the 2010 census, the township has a total area of 40.07 square miles (103.8 km^{2}), of which 31.86 square miles (82.5 km^{2}) (or 79.51%) is land and 8.21 square miles (21.3 km^{2}) (or 20.49%) is water.

== Demographics ==
Historical population
Census	Pop.	Note	%±
2016 (est.)	712
U.S. Decennial Census
