= Knickerbocker Ice Company =

19th-century New York company

The Knickerbocker Ice Company was an ice company based in New York State during the 19th century.

== Early history ==
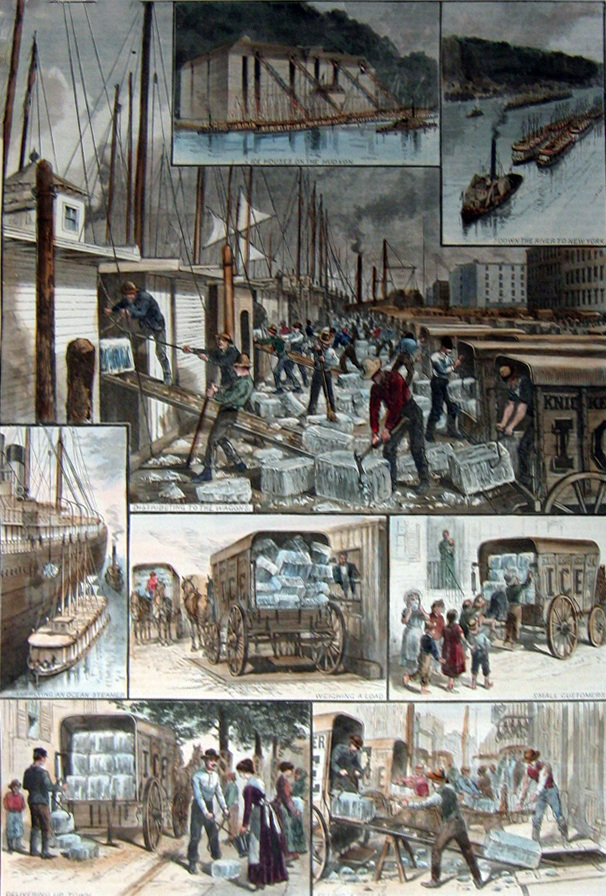
The ice trade around New York; from top: ice houses on the Hudson River; ice barges being towed to New York; barges being unloaded; ocean steamship being supplied; ice being weighed; small customers being sold ice; the "uptown trade" to wealthier customers; an ice cellar being filled; by F. Ray, Harper's Weekly, 30 August 1884

When John J. Felter, John G. Perry, and Edward Felter started selling ice taken from the Hudson Lake and sold it in New York City, it became so profitable that the group created a company called Barmore, Felter, and Company. The success of this company prompted other ice businesses to come together in order to compete and these formed the Knickerbocker Ice Company. The Ice trade company, was founded in 1831 on the eastern bank of Rockland Lake in the hamlets of Congers and Valley Cottage in Rockland County, New York. It rapidly became a commercial success because it was the cleanest and purest ice of the Hudson River Valley region. Icehouses could be found along the Hudson River and on lakes from the Catskills to Albany making the Hudson River Valley the largest producer of ice in the area. Aware of the purity of the ice, numerous companies purchased land around Rockland Lake hoping to gain complete control of the lake.

In 1855, the Knickerbocker Ice Company was incorporated from the consolidation of the surrounding companies, which each brought valuable techniques to improve the harvesting of ice. When the gravity rail was built in 1856 and purchased its former rival, the Washington Ice Company, as a tow company in 1869 then purchased the entire company for the then astronomical sum of $1.1 million.

=== Facilities ===
During this time, the company owned dozens of steamboats, 75 ice barges, and employed 3,000 workers, which was economically important because the ice industry opened up more jobs for the hundreds and thousands of people who were looking to find work in the booming industries that resulted from the Industrial Revolution.

As the company grew and the demand for ice increased, the Knickerbocker Ice Company needed to build more icehouses to store its products and to fill them more efficiently. Before steam-powered conveyor belts, which were generally found in large icehouses, the company used ice cakes moved by either man or horse to fill the houses, which was extremely time consuming. By using conveyor belts, the workers simply had to load the ice onto the belts. New York City was the home of numerous hotels, businesses, and restaurants that consumed more ice than any other city in the United States. By 1882, the Knickerbocker Ice Company was the largest ice company supplying New York City and maintained storage facilities at West 43rd Street, West 20th Street, Bank Street, 432 Canal Street, Delancey street, East 33rd Street, 92nd street, and East 128th Street.

It is estimated New York City consumed 285,000 tons of ice per year, most of it purchased from Rockland Lake, resulting in the nickname the “Icehouse of New York City”. Not only did the Knickerbocker Ice Company own ice houses on Rockland Lake, its success as a company and diverse means of transportation allowed it to purchase more houses along the Hudson River to expand its empire. With the invention of artificial ice, the Knickerbocker Ice Company was on the decline by 1900. It closed to the public in 1924.

== Early growth ==
Frederic Tudor, of Boston, is believed to have created the first commercially owned icehouses and shipped ice internationally for profit. While Tudor encouraged the ice industry to expand, there was still no proper way to store ice and people had not yet needed it apart from their daily lives. At the time, hotels and butchers were the only purchasers of ice and used it to preserve their food in the summer, leaving people to speculate the ice industry was doomed for failure. Alfred Barmore rescued and revolutionized the industry by incorporating saws and horsepower to harvest ice more quickly and efficiently, and in larger quantities than before. Companies caught onto these techniques rather quickly and on top of that inventors created a way to insulate ice for longer periods of time raising the demand for ice. Upon Barmore's death, his son-in-law Robert Maclay became president of the Knickerbocker Ice Company.

== Icehouses ==
Icehouses were used at the time to keep the ice insulated. There were two components of an icehouse: a wooden icehouse, and a powerhouse constructed of wood or brick. They were usually painted white to yellow to reflect the sunlight and keep the ice from melting. Icehouses were doubled walled and insulated with sawdust, wood shavings, or straw to prevent heat from melting the ice during the warmer months.

== Scandals ==
In 1896, the Knickerbocker Ice Company and other major ice companies consolidated into a natural trust that led to speculation that it was trying to fix the prices of its products. When this occurred, the price of ice doubled, setting off a wave of unrest and demonstrations by the public who felt they were being taken advantage of. At the center of this scandal was New York Mayor Robert Anderson Van Wyck and numerous city officials. Van Wyck was accused of conspiring to create an ice monopoly and it is believed the mayor and his brother were given $1.7 million in the trust’s stock. In 1900, Van Wyck and the suspected city officials appeared before Justice William Jay Gaynor and told the court that Charles W. Morse, President of the American Ice Company, advised him to purchase these stocks, which he said, he never did. This scandal was the reason Van Wyck was not re-elected for another term the following year.

President Wesley M. Oler took the stand for the company in 1911 when detectives traveled to Rockland Lake to find the icehouses packed with ice but no workers to load the product onto barges to New York City. The lack of workers had to do with the two dollars they were getting paid when small, independent companies were paying double what bigger companies like Knickerbocker were paying their employees. Oler took to the stand to tell the court he was paying his workers properly and was even paying them extra for the work they did on Sundays, but the workers rebelled. When detectives dug deeper into the situation, they discovered Oler secretly made deals with other companies to purchase ice when they were suffering from deficiencies. Oler came up with numerous excuses why he was conducting the Knickerbocker Ice Company’s business in such a way. He explained it was cheaper to transport ice in smaller quantities to meet the demands of clients than to purchase more rail cars and transport everything at once. Also, the 1890s was an exceptionally warm winter which was a major setback for the ice industry since there was not much ice to sell to consumers. Oler told the court he searched for skilled workers to harvest ice during the warm season but was unsuccessful, which is the why these complications occurred while he was president of the company.

== Decline and demise ==
The use of electricity led to the decline of the Hudson River Valley’s most successful ice company of the 19th century. When the company was first established in the 1830s, the ice industry had not yet peaked, the icebox had not yet been invented, allowing for the storage of ice at home. With the advent of iceboxes, ice could last for about a week, keeping food fresh.

The 1900s began the decline of the Knickerbocker Ice Company and other ice companies across the Hudson River Valley. Inventors had devised ways to use electricity to refrigerate food. Although expensive, it was a product that would eventually be found in everyone’s home by the 1920s. Along with fractional horsepower motors for electric powered refrigerators, artificial ice was also created so that households no longer needed to call their local “iceman” to deliver their block of ice to their homes. The Knickerbocker Company resisted the change. Robert Maclay articulated this position when he said, "the cost of manufacturing such ice, even without the additional cost of making a chemically pure article, precludes the prospect of ever bringing it profitably into competition with ice formed by nature's own hand."

The last block of ice was harvested from Rockland Lake in 1924 and the Knickerbocker Ice Company closed to the public. Two years later during the demolition of the remaining icehouses, one that was still filled with sawdust to insulate the ice caught fire and destroyed almost all of Rockland Lake Village. Twenty years later, an abandoned icehouse in Washington Heights, Manhattan burned on December 13, 1946, destroying an adjacent apartment building at 2525 Amsterdam avenue at 184th street and killing 37 people.

== Legacy ==
The Palisades Interstate Park Commission acquired a large extent of property around Rockland Lake State Park and along the Hudson River in 1963 to preserve the Knickerbocker Ice Company’s accomplishments and contributions to the ice industry. There is a historical plaque at the foundation of what is left of the company from the fire in 1926. Rockland Lake State Park held the first annual Knickerbocker Ice Festival in 2007, when co-founders Robert Patalano and Timothy Englert fabricated an ice sculpture replicating the famous ice house along the shoreline. The sculpture lasted for five weeks before melting. The festival's ice sculpting competitions, history walking tours around the lake, food vendors, and other events commemorated the ice harvesting history and its transformation of Rockland County.

== See also ==
- List of ice companies
