= St. Bede Academy =

Location
- 24 West U.S. Highway 6 Peru, Illinois 61354; United States; 41°19′18″N 89°9′58″W

Information
- Type: Private, College-preparatory; Day & Boarding
- Motto: Ut in omnibus glorificetur Deus (That in All Things God May Be Glorified)
- Denomination: Roman Catholic
- Established: 1890
- Oversight: Diocese of Peoria
- Superintendent: Eve Postula
- Principal: David Lawrence
- Chaplain: Fr. Dominic Garramone, O.S.B.
- Grades: 9–12
- Gender: Coeducational
- Enrollment: 285 (2023)
- Campus: Rural
- Campus size: 800-acre (3.2 km^{2})
- Colors: Green and White
- Athletics conference: Tri-County Conference
- Team name: Bruins or Lady Bruins
- Accreditation: North Central Association of Colleges and Schools
- Yearbook: The Bedan Way
- Tuition: $6,850
- Affiliation: Benedictine
- Website: www.st-bede.com

Saint Bede Academy is a private, four-year, Catholic high school located in Peru, Illinois. The academy is operated by Benedictine monks of Saint Bede Abbey who participate as teachers, administrators, and staff members.

The school is accredited by the State of Illinois, the North Central Association, and the Office of Catholic Education of the Roman Catholic Diocese of Peoria.

== History ==
St. Bede Abbey and Academy were founded in 1890 by six monks tasked with establishing a Benedictine teaching institution where young men could receive a Catholic education. The school was dedicated on October 12, 1891 as an all-boys boarding school, remaining as such until 1973, at which time it became a coeducational institution.

In 1981, the boarding program ceased, and the former dormitory rooms were converted into additional class and office space.

St. Bede resumed its boarding program in 2007. Ten percent of the student population consists of boarding students. Currently, St. Bede houses male and female boarders in separate houses located on-campus. Both houses operate under the care of a married couple who live with and supervise the boarders.

The original school building is still in use. It has undergone numerous renovations since it was built over one hundred years ago. In 2018 the Perino Science Center was constructed as an addition to the north face of the Academy. The school's continued maintenance and capital development has always depended heavily on the monetary contributions of its over-7000 alumni and other donors. The school operates several fundraising events such as an annual auction and phone-a-thon to help bridge the difference between tuition and actual operating costs.

== Academic life ==
The school operates on a fixed daily schedule of eight periods of forty-three minutes. Students are required to enroll in seven courses per semester. The school year is divided into two 18-week semesters. Additionally, students must garner at least 25 academic credits to graduate, as well as complete 25 hours of service work per academic year.

== Student profile ==
As of the 2024–25 school year, Saint Bede Academy had an enrollment of 271 students. The school reported a student-faculty ratio of 11.5:1 and an average class size of 16.9 students.

== Athletics ==
St. Bede competes in the Three Rivers Conference for all sports. Beginning in 2023-24 school year, St. Bede will compete in the Tri-County Conference for all sports except football, which will compete in the newly formed Chicago Prairie Conference.

Boys sports: Baseball, Basketball, Bowling, Cross Country, Football, Golf, Swimming, Tennis, Track, Weightlifting, Wrestling.

Girls sports: Basketball, Bowling, Cheerleading, Cross Country, Golf, Softball, Swimming, Tennis, Track, Volleyball, Weightlifting.

The softball team won the IHSA Class 1A state championship in 2023.

== Campus ==
The 800 acre St. Bede campus includes the school, its attached monastery, a church, a football field with stands, a baseball field with stands, a basketball stadium/theater, an outdoor 400 meter track, a soccer field, the Saint Bede Abbey Press building, the boarding houses, and much open space, including an apple orchard, as well as corn and soybean fields.

=== Facility ===
The school is a five-level brick building with dozens of classrooms and offices. The building can be perceived in halves, with the north half containing most of the classrooms and the south half containing most of the offices.

The main administrative office is located on the first floor. There are computer labs on the first and second floors. The art department takes up most of the third floor. The science labs and classrooms are located in the Perino Science Center. Lockers are located on the second and third levels of the building. There is a tunnel that connects the main building with the gym, where physical education classes are held.

=== Saint Bede Abbey ===
St. Bede Abbey, attached to the school, is the permanent residence of twelve monks who live according to the Rule of Saint Benedict.

The Abbey, like the Academy, was founded in 1890 by a group of six monks who were sent from St. Vincent Archabbey in Latrobe, Pennsylvania to spread the Benedictine tradition. By 1910, the community of monks had grown large enough to become independent from St. Vincent's and thus elected their first abbot. The population of monks peaked in the middle of the twentieth century, and has since declined to its current population of 32.

The current abbot is Philip Davey, OSB, who succeeded former abbot Claude Peifer, OSB, in June 2011. Abbot Peifer, likewise, succeeded Abbot Roger Corpus, OSB, in 2003.

=== Abbey Church ===
The Abbey Church is a multi-purpose building containing a general assembly area, students' chapel, theater/lecture hall, lounge, kitchenette, and conference rooms. The students use the Abbey Church for Eucharistic liturgies, prayer services, penance services, classes, plays, and meetings.

=== Library ===
The St. Bede Academy library is a multilevel facility consisting of two large reading rooms on two levels joined by four levels of stacks. The theology library consists of the upper reading room and the top level of the stacks. The academy library consists of the lower reading room and three levels of stacks. The academy collection totals 20,000 volumes and the monastery collection contains 19,000 volumes.

=== Student refectory ===
The student refectory, located on the main floor of the school building, provides hot lunch and snack items daily to students. Students remain on campus during lunchtime. The refectory was renovated during the summer of 1997 to restore the original tin ceiling which had been covered over for years. Ceiling fan/light fixtures now hang to provide an atmosphere of former days at the Academy. A commons area located in the Perino Science Center is a gathering place for students where students go to meet socially, study. etc. Refreshments are always available in the PSC vending area.

=== Notable alumni ===
- Andrew J. Bacevich – Professor at Boston University and Johns Hopkins, author and historian, Princeton-West-Point
- J. A. Happ – Pitcher for New York Yankees, Northwestern University
- James Massey – Professor at University of Notre Dame, MIT and ETH Zurich
- Michael Stuart – sports physician and orthopedic surgeon

== Sexual abuse cases ==
In 1991, Rev. Samuel D. Pusateri, a Benedictine priest who served at St. Bede Academy, pleaded guilty to the criminal sexual assault of a 17-year-old student. According to the 2023 report released by the Illinois Attorney General, despite Pusateri's conviction and six-year prison sentence, he continued to serve in ministry roles until as late as 2018. The report also notes that the Diocese of Peoria did not publicly list him as a credibly accused priest until the Attorney General's investigation prompted a reassessment of past cases. The report further observed a broader pattern of denial and minimization within the clergy in response to allegations of abuse.

In its 2023 report, the Illinois Attorney General also documented allegations involving Rev. Kenneth J. Roberts, a priest of the Diocese of Dallas who served as a retreat leader for the Diocese of Peoria. According to the report, during an Emmaus Days retreat at Saint Bede Abbey in the 1980s, Roberts took a fifth- or sixth-grade boy from a confessional service through the school and into the office of Saint Bede Academy's principal, where Roberts forcibly held and repeatedly kissed him. The report states that Rev. Samuel D. Pusateri served as the abbey liaison for the retreat. The Diocese of Peoria acknowledged Roberts as credibly accused of child sexual abuse within the diocese only after the Attorney General's investigation had begun, despite the survivor having reported the abuse to the diocese more than a decade earlier.
