= Magnolia Township, Putnam County, Illinois =

Coordinates: 41°08′31″N 89°13′41″W

Magnolia Township
- Township
- Location in Putnam County

- Putnam County's location in Illinois
- Country: United States
- State: Illinois
- County: Putnam
- Established: November 8, 1855

Area
  - Total: 43.4 sq mi (112 km^{2})
  - Land: 42.26 sq mi (109.5 km^{2})
  - Water: 1.13 sq mi (2.9 km^{2}) 2.60%

Population (2010)
  - Estimate (2016): 1,005
  - Density: 25.2/sq mi (9.7/km^{2})
- Time zone: UTC-6 (CST)
  - Summer (DST): UTC-5 (CDT)
- FIPS code: 17-155-46123

Magnolia Township is located in Putnam County, Illinois. As of the 2010 census, its population was 1,066 and it contained 532 housing units.

== Geography ==
According to the 2010 census, the township has a total area of 43.4 square miles (112 km^{2}), of which 42.26 square miles (109.5 km^{2}) (or 97.37%) is land and 1.13 square miles (2.9 km^{2}) (or 2.60%) is water. The village of McNabb is located in the north of the township and the village of Magnolia is located in its south.

== Demographics ==
Historical population
Census	Pop.	Note	%±
2016 (est.)	1,005
U.S. Decennial Census
