= McNabb, Illinois =

Village of McNabb
- Location of McNabb in Putnam County, Illinois.
- Coordinates: 41°10′37″N 89°12′35″W
- Country: United States
- State: Illinois
- County: Putnam
- Township: Magnolia

Area
  - Total: 0.18 sq mi (0.46 km^{2})
  - Land: 0.18 sq mi (0.46 km^{2})
  - Water: 0 sq mi (0.00 km^{2})
- Elevation: 689 ft (210 m)

Population (2020)
  - Total: 275
  - Density: 1,549.4/sq mi (598.24/km^{2})
- Time zone: UTC-6 (CST)
  - Summer (DST): UTC-5 (CDT)
- ZIP codes: 61335
- FIPS code: 17-45850
- GNIS feature ID: 2399298
- Website: http://www.villageofmcnabb.org/

McNabb is a village in Putnam County, Illinois, United States. As of the 2020 census, McNabb had a population of 275. It is part of the Ottawa Micropolitan Statistical Area. Just outside of McNabb is the Clear Creek Meeting House, one of the few surviving western Quaker meeting houses. The Meeting House once hosted local abolitionists, such as Benjamin Lundy.

In 1900, the Indiana, Illinois, and Iowa Railroad wanted a station in Magnolia Township. Hon. J. M. McNabb, at that time county judge, promoted it and the resulting station and town were named after him. Today the Toluca, Marquette & Northern Railroad also runs through the town.

== Geography ==
According to the 2010 census, McNabb has a total area of 0.2 square miles (0.52 km^{2}), all land.

== Demographics ==
Historical population
Census	Pop.	Note	%±
1960	176		—
1970	246		39.8%
1980	342		39.0%
1990	310		−9.4%
2000	310		0.0%
2010	285		−8.1%
2020	275		−3.5%
U.S. Decennial Census

As of the census of 2000, there were 310 people, 125 households, and 91 families residing in the village. The population density was 1,555.4 inhabitants per square mile (600.5/km^{2}). There were 129 housing units at an average density of 647.2 per square mile (249.9/km^{2}). The racial makeup of the village was 100.00% White.

There were 125 households, out of which 34.4% had children under the age of 18 living with them, 62.4% were married couples living together, 5.6% had a female householder with no husband present, and 26.4% were non-families. 24.0% of all households were made up of individuals, and 12.0% had someone living alone who was 65 years of age or older. The average household size was 2.48 and the average family size was 2.92.

In the village, the population was spread out, with 25.2% under the age of 18, 7.7% from 18 to 24, 30.3% from 25 to 44, 24.2% from 45 to 64, and 12.6% who were 65 years of age or older. The median age was 37 years. For every 100 females, there were 103.9 males. For every 100 females age 18 and over, there were 103.5 males.

The median income for a household in the village was $51,389, and the median income for a family was $55,357. Males had a median income of $32,083 versus $22,143 for females. The per capita income for the village was $20,374. About 5.7% of families and 5.6% of the population were below the poverty line, including 12.3% of those under age 18 and none of those age 65 or over.

== Education ==
It is in the Putnam County Community Unit School District 535.
