= Granville, Illinois =

Village of Granville
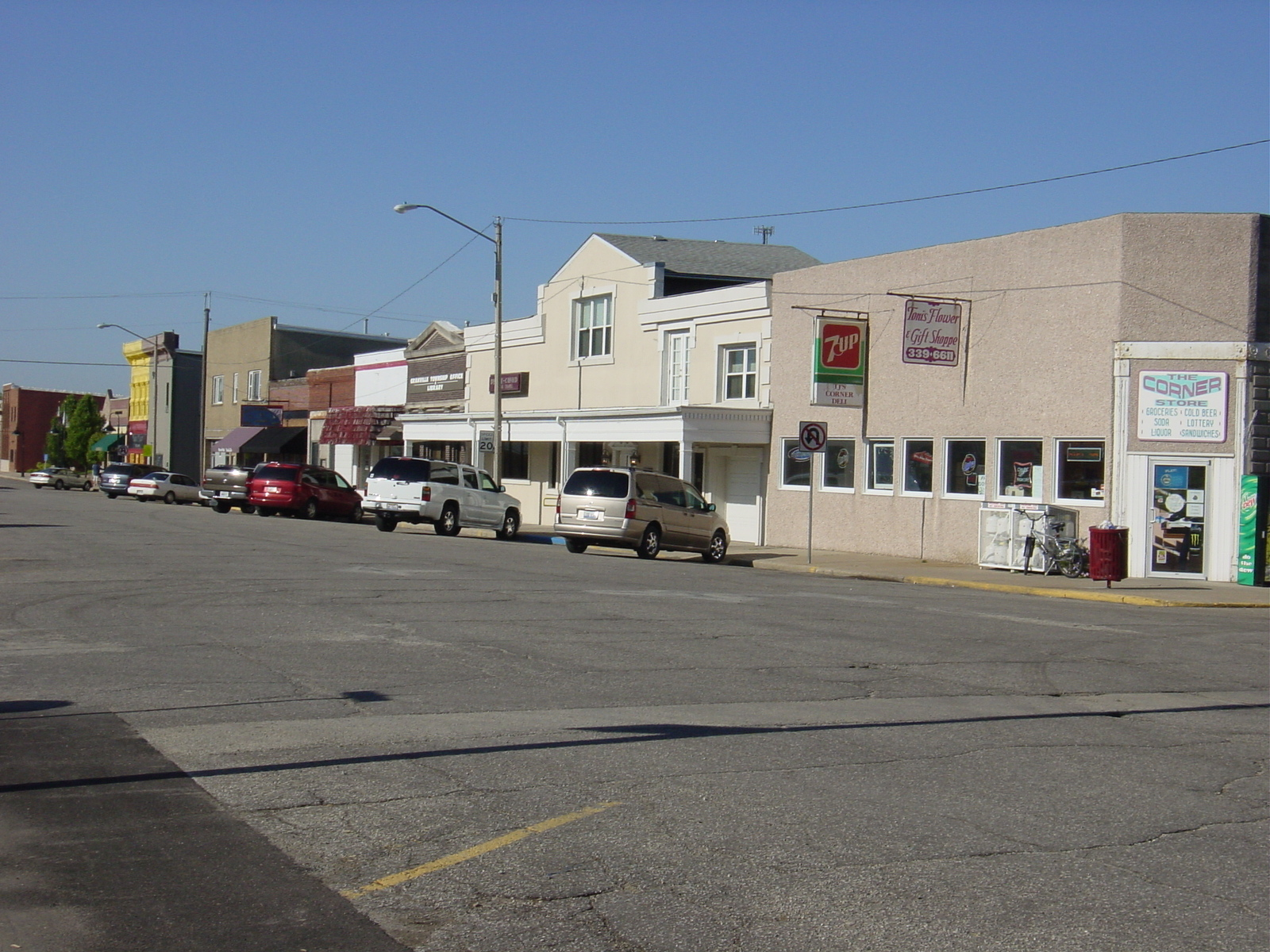
- Downtown Granville, Illinois

- Location of Granville in Putnam County, Illinois.
- Coordinates: 41°15′57″N 89°13′50″W
- Country: United States
- State: Illinois
- County: Putnam
- Township: Granville

Area
  - Total: 1.31 sq mi (3.38 km^{2})
  - Land: 1.31 sq mi (3.38 km^{2})
  - Water: 0 sq mi (0.00 km^{2})
- Elevation: 682 ft (208 m)

Population (2020)
  - Total: 1,359
  - Density: 1,040.0/sq mi (401.53/km^{2})
- Time zone: UTC-6 (CST)
  - Summer (DST): UTC-5 (CDT)
- ZIP code: 61326
- FIPS code: 17-31017
- GNIS feature ID: 2398194
- Website: villageofgranvilleil.gov

Granville is a village in Putnam County, Illinois, United States. As of the 2020 census, Granville had a population of 1,359. It is the largest community in Putnam County. It is part of the Ottawa Micropolitan Statistical Area.

== History ==
The village of Granville is named after Granville, Massachusetts. The founding of the St. Paul Mine in neighboring Mark in 1903 and the Berry Mine in nearby Standard in 1905 caused Granville to expand from a farming center to become a commercial center in a coal mining region.

On April 20, 2004, Granville was struck by a series of tornadoes, which destroyed the local primary school, the high school baseball diamond, and numerous houses.

== Geography ==
According to the 2010 census, the village has a total area of 0.97 square miles (2.5 km^{2}), all land.

== Demographics ==
Historical population
| Census | Pop. | Note | %± |
|---|---|---|---|
| 1880 | 260 | | — |
| 1890 | 148 | | −43.1% |
| 1900 | 320 | | 116.2% |
| 1910 | 1,391 | | 334.7% |
| 1920 | 1,427 | | 2.6% |
| 1930 | 949 | | −33.5% |
| 1940 | 1,038 | | 9.4% |
| 1950 | 978 | | −5.8% |
| 1960 | 1,048 | | 7.2% |
| 1970 | 1,232 | | 17.6% |
| 1980 | 1,537 | | 24.8% |
| 1990 | 1,407 | | −8.5% |
| 2000 | 1,414 | | 0.5% |
| 2010 | 1,427 | | 0.9% |
| 2020 | 1,359 | | −4.8% |
U.S. Decennial Census

=== 2020 census ===
As of the 2020 census, Granville had a population of 1,359. The median age was 43.6 years. 19.1% of residents were under the age of 18 and 22.8% of residents were 65 years of age or older. For every 100 females there were 101.6 males, and for every 100 females age 18 and over there were 94.9 males age 18 and over.

0.0% of residents lived in urban areas, while 100.0% lived in rural areas.

There were 600 households in Granville, of which 25.2% had children under the age of 18 living in them. Of all households, 48.5% were married-couple households, 17.3% were households with a male householder and no spouse or partner present, and 26.3% were households with a female householder and no spouse or partner present. About 29.7% of all households were made up of individuals and 14.0% had someone living alone who was 65 years of age or older.

There were 654 housing units, of which 8.3% were vacant. The homeowner vacancy rate was 2.1% and the rental vacancy rate was 9.5%.

Racial composition as of the 2020 census
| Race | Number | Percent |
|---|---|---|
| White | 1,232 | 90.7% |
| Black or African American | 10 | 0.7% |
| American Indian and Alaska Native | 5 | 0.4% |
| Asian | 9 | 0.7% |
| Native Hawaiian and Other Pacific Islander | 1 | 0.1% |
| Some other race | 30 | 2.2% |
| Two or more races | 72 | 5.3% |
| Hispanic or Latino (of any race) | 107 | 7.9% |

=== 2000 census ===
As of the census of 2000, there were 1,414 people, 591 households, and 395 families residing in the village. The population density was 1,476.8 inhabitants per square mile (570.2/km^{2}). There were 626 housing units at an average density of 653.8 per square mile (252.4/km^{2}). The racial makeup of the village was 97.88% White, 0.42% African American, 0.07% Native American, 0.42% Asian, 0.71% from other races, and 0.50% from two or more races. Hispanic or Latino of any race were 3.39% of the population.

There were 591 households, out of which 29.8% had children under the age of 18 living with them, 54.8% were married couples living together, 8.1% had a female householder with no husband present, and 33.0% were non-families. 30.5% of all households were made up of individuals, and 17.3% had someone living alone who was 65 years of age or older. The average household size was 2.39 and the average family size was 2.95.

In the village, the population was spread out, with 24.8% under the age of 18, 7.6% from 18 to 24, 24.7% from 25 to 44, 25.8% from 45 to 64, and 17.0% who were 65 years of age or older. The median age was 40 years. For every 100 females, there were 86.1 males. For every 100 females age 18 and over, there were 84.2 males.

The median income for a household in the village was $41,548, and the median income for a family was $55,093. Males had a median income of $41,932 versus $21,364 for females. The per capita income for the village was $20,074. About 3.6% of families and 4.1% of the population were below the poverty line, including 5.5% of those under age 18 and 6.2% of those age 65 or over.

== Education ==
It is in the Putnam County Community Unit School District 535.

== Notable people ==
- Edward K. Hall (1870–1932), football coach
- Red Ruffing (1905–1986), professional baseball
- Charles T. Wardlaw (1858–1928), politician
