= Granville Township, Putnam County, Illinois =

Coordinates: 41°15′31″N 89°13′07″W

Granville Township
- Township
- Location in Putnam County

- Putnam County's location in Illinois
- Country: United States
- State: Illinois
- County: Putnam
- Established: November 8, 1855

Area
  - Total: 45.52 sq mi (117.9 km^{2})
  - Land: 44.68 sq mi (115.7 km^{2})
  - Water: 0.83 sq mi (2.1 km^{2}) 1.82%

Population (2010)
  - Estimate (2016): 2,726
  - Density: 65.7/sq mi (25.4/km^{2})
- Time zone: UTC-6 (CST)
  - Summer (DST): UTC-5 (CDT)
- FIPS code: 17-155-31030

Granville Township is located in Putnam County, Illinois. As of the 2010 census, its population was 2,934 and it contained 1,318 housing units.

== History ==
Granville Township is named after Granville, Massachusetts.

== Geography ==
According to the 2010 census, the township has a total area of 45.52 square miles (117.9 km^{2}), of which 44.68 square miles (115.7 km^{2}) (or 98.15%) is land and 0.83 square miles (2.1 km^{2}) (or 1.82%) is water.

== Demographics ==
Historical population
Census	Pop.	Note	%±
2016 (est.)	2,726
U.S. Decennial Census
