= Putnam County, Illinois =

County in Illinois, United States

- County
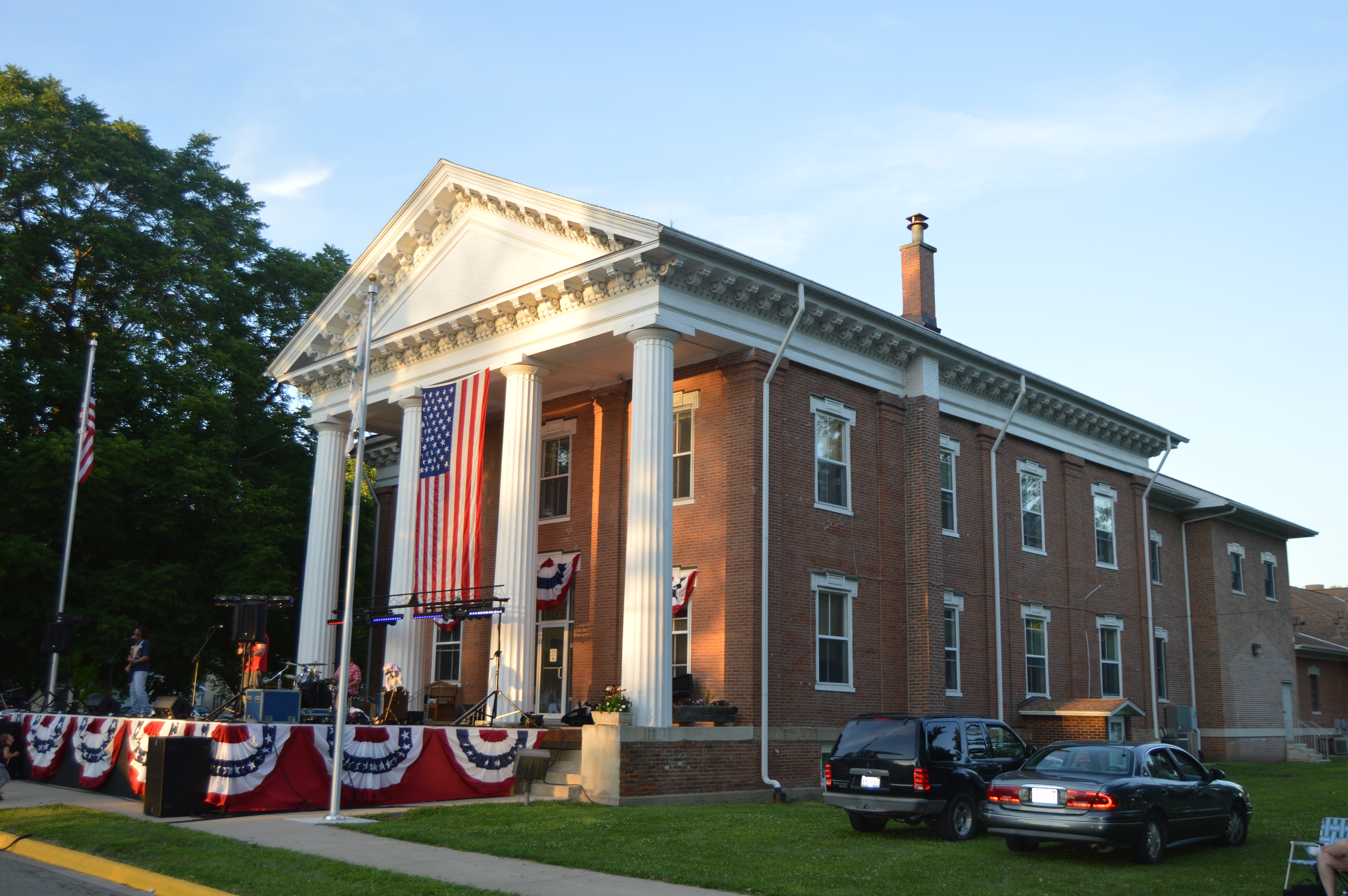
- Putnam County Courthouse, Hennepin

- Location within the U.S. state of Illinois
- Coordinates: 41°12′N 89°17′W
- Country: United States
- State: Illinois
- Founded: 1825
- Named for: Israel Putnam
- Seat: Hennepin
- Largest village: Granville

Area
  - Total: 172 sq mi (450 km^{2})
  - Land: 160 sq mi (410 km^{2})
  - Water: 12 sq mi (31 km^{2}) 7.0%

Population (2020)
  - Total: 5,637
  - Estimate (2025): 5,619 ▼
  - Density: 35/sq mi (14/km^{2})
- Time zone: UTC−6 (Central)
  - Summer (DST): UTC−5 (CDT)
- Congressional districts: 14th, 16th
- Website: putnamil.gov

Putnam County is the least extensive county in the U.S. state of Illinois. According to the 2020 United States census, it had a population of 5,637. The county seat is Hennepin. The county was formed in 1825 out of Fulton County and named after Israel Putnam, who was a general in the American Revolution. Putnam County is part of the Ottawa, IL Micropolitan Statistical Area.

== Geography ==
According to the U.S. Census Bureau, the county has a total area of 172 square miles (450 km^{2}), of which 160 square miles (410 km^{2}) is land and 12 square miles (31 km^{2}) (7.0%) is water. It is the smallest county in Illinois by area.

=== Climate and weather ===
Hennepin, Illinois

Climate chart (precipitation, max. and min. temperature)
J	F	M	A	M	J	J	A	S	O	N	D
1.1 30 13	1.2 36 19	2.2 48 29	3.2 62 39	3.6 73 50	4.2 83 59	3.8 86 64	4.3 84 62	3.6 77 53	2.7 65 41	2.5 49 31	2 36 19
- █ Average max. and min. temperatures in °F
- █ Precipitation totals in inches
- Source: The Weather Channel
Metric conversion
J	F	M	A	M	J	J	A	S	O	N	D
29 −1 −11	29 2 −7	55 9 −2	82 17 4	92 23 10	107 28 15	96 30 18	110 29 17	92 25 12	69 18 5	63 9 −1	52 2 −7
- █ Average max. and min. temperatures in °C
- █ Precipitation totals in mm

In recent years, average temperatures in the county seat of Hennepin have ranged from a low of 13 °F (−11 °C) in January to a high of 86 °F (30 °C) in July, although a record low of −30 °F (−34 °C) was recorded in January 1999 and a record high of 104 °F (40 °C) was recorded in June 1988. Average monthly precipitation ranged from 1.14 inches (29 mm) in January to 4.32 inches (110 mm) in August.

=== Major highways ===
- Interstate 180
- Illinois Route 18
- Illinois Route 26
- Illinois Route 29
- Illinois Route 71
- Illinois Route 89

=== Adjacent counties ===
- Bureau County (northwest)
- LaSalle County (east)
- Marshall County (south)
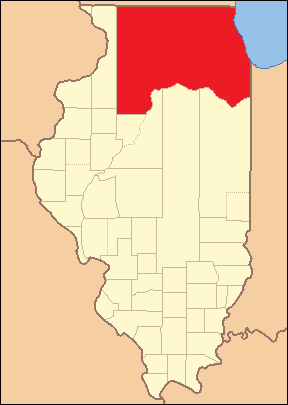
Putnam County at the time of its creation in 1825

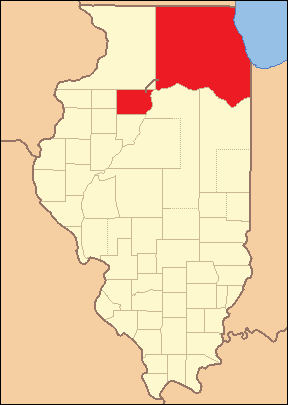
The county split in two portions, 1827-1831

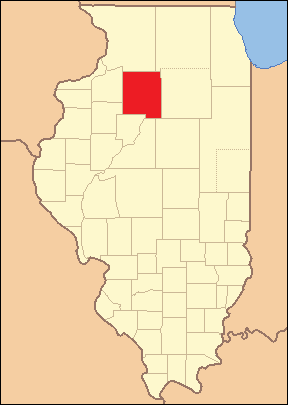
Putnam County between 1831 and 1837

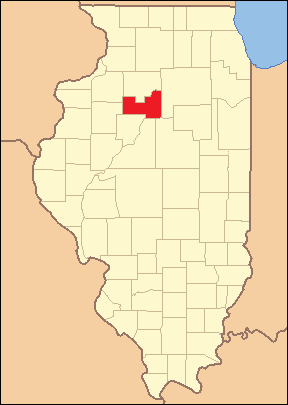
Putnam between 1837 and 1839

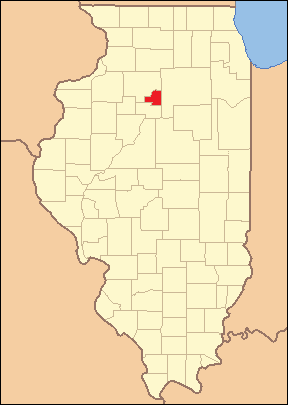
Putnam in 1839, reduced to its present borders

== Demographics ==
Historical population
Census	Pop.	Note	%±
1840	2,131		—
1850	3,924		84.1%
1860	5,587		42.4%
1870	6,280		12.4%
1880	5,554		−11.6%
1890	4,730		−14.8%
1900	4,746		0.3%
1910	7,561		59.3%
1920	7,579		0.2%
1930	5,235		−30.9%
1940	5,289		1.0%
1950	4,746		−10.3%
1960	4,570		−3.7%
1970	5,007		9.6%
1980	6,085		21.5%
1990	5,730		−5.8%
2000	6,086		6.2%
2010	6,006		−1.3%
2020	5,637		−6.1%
2025 (est.)	5,619	▼	−0.3%
U.S. Decennial Census; 1790-1960 1900-1990; 1990-2000 2010

=== 2020 census ===
As of the 2020 census, the county had a population of 5,637. The median age was 47.0 years. 19.2% of residents were under the age of 18 and 22.5% of residents were 65 years of age or older. For every 100 females there were 102.0 males, and for every 100 females age 18 and over there were 100.4 males age 18 and over.

The racial makeup of the county was 91.8% White, 0.5% Black or African American, 0.2% American Indian and Alaska Native, 0.3% Asian, 0.1% Native Hawaiian and Pacific Islander, 2.3% from some other race, and 4.8% from two or more races. Hispanic or Latino residents of any race comprised 6.2% of the population.

Less than 0.1% of residents lived in urban areas, while 100.0% lived in rural areas.

There were 2,426 households in the county, of which 25.9% had children under the age of 18 living in them. Of all households, 53.8% were married-couple households, 17.8% were households with a male householder and no spouse or partner present, and 20.8% were households with a female householder and no spouse or partner present. About 27.1% of all households were made up of individuals and 12.9% had someone living alone who was 65 years of age or older.

There were 3,057 housing units, of which 20.6% were vacant. Among occupied housing units, 82.2% were owner-occupied and 17.8% were renter-occupied. The homeowner vacancy rate was 2.4% and the rental vacancy rate was 9.9%.

=== Racial and ethnic composition ===
Putnam County, Illinois – Racial and ethnic composition Note: the US Census treats Hispanic/Latino as an ethnic category. This table excludes Latinos from the racial categories and assigns them to a separate category. Hispanics/Latinos may be of any race.
Race / Ethnicity (NH = Non-Hispanic)	Pop 1980	Pop 1990	Pop 2000	Pop 2010	Pop 2020	% 1980	% 1990	% 2000	% 2010	% 2020
White alone (NH)	6,039	5,569	5,817	5,654	5,073	99.24%	97.19%	95.58%	94.14%	89.99%
Black or African American alone (NH)	6	9	37	31	26	0.10%	0.16%	0.61%	0.52%	0.46%
Native American or Alaska Native alone (NH)	5	6	14	5	7	0.08%	0.10%	0.23%	0.08%	0.12%
Asian alone (NH)	2	7	16	13	18	0.03%	0.12%	0.26%	0.22%	0.32%
Native Hawaiian or Pacific Islander alone (NH)	x	x	0	1	4	x	x	0.00%	0.02%	0.07%
Other race alone (NH)	1	1	0	1	8	0.02%	0.02%	0.00%	0.02%	0.14%
Mixed race or Multiracial (NH)	x	x	31	49	153	x	x	0.51%	0.82%	2.71%
Hispanic or Latino (any race)	32	138	171	252	348	0.53%	2.41%	2.81%	4.20%	6.17%
Total	6,085	5,730	6,086	6,006	5,637	100.00%	100.00%	100.00%	100.00%	100.00%

=== 2010 census ===
As of the 2010 census, there were 6,006 people, 2,509 households, and 1,734 families residing in the county. The population density was 37.5 inhabitants per square mile (14.5/km^{2}). There were 3,074 housing units at an average density of 19.2 per square mile (7.4/km^{2}). The racial makeup of the county was 96.6% white, 0.5% black or African American, 0.2% Asian, 0.1% American Indian, 1.4% from other races, and 1.1% from two or more races. Those of Hispanic or Latino origin made up 4.2% of the population. In terms of ancestry, 46.5% were German, 16.7% were Irish, 16.3% were Italian, 10.9% were Polish, 10.1% were English, 5.1% were Swedish, and 3.5% were American.

Of the 2,509 households, 27.7% had children under the age of 18 living with them, 57.6% were married couples living together, 7.2% had a female householder with no husband present, 30.9% were non-families, and 26.0% of all households were made up of individuals. The average household size was 2.39 and the average family size was 2.85. The median age was 45.2 years.

The median income for a household in the county was $56,458 and the median income for a family was $68,875. Males had a median income of $50,205 versus $31,886 for females. The per capita income for the county was $27,004. About 6.2% of families and 10.9% of the population were below the poverty line, including 21.8% of those under age 18 and 5.4% of those age 65 or over.

== Communities ==
=== Villages ===
- Granville
- Hennepin
- Magnolia
- Mark
- McNabb
- Standard

=== Unincorporated communities ===
- Florid
- Mount Palatine (partially in LaSalle)
- Putnam
- Walnut Grove

=== Townships ===
Putnam County is divided into four townships:

- Granville
- Hennepin
- Magnolia
- Senachwine

== Politics ==
Prior to 1988, Putnam County was a Republican Party stronghold in presidential elections, backing the Republican candidate in all but three elections from 1892 to 1984. From 1988 to 2012, the county consistently backed Democratic Party presidential candidates, but none fared better than Illinois resident Barack Obama's 56.9% in 2008. However, he failed to win a majority of the county's votes four years later despite winning it overall in his 2012 reelection bid. This foreshadowed what was to come in the 2016 election, as the county swung 21.8 points Republican to back Donald Trump over Illinois-born Hillary Clinton by a margin of 19.9%.

United States presidential election results for Putnam County, Illinois
Year	Republican		Democratic		Third party(ies)	
Year	No.	%	No.	%	No.	%
1892	561	49.04%	514	44.93%	69	6.03%
1896	706	58.06%	479	39.39%	31	2.55%
1900	738	60.29%	450	36.76%	36	2.94%
1904	753	65.03%	355	30.66%	50	4.32%
1908	834	62.99%	413	31.19%	77	5.82%
1912	583	39.88%	424	29.00%	455	31.12%
1916	1,444	62.48%	785	33.97%	82	3.55%
1920	1,623	74.04%	362	16.51%	207	9.44%
1924	1,364	61.50%	260	11.72%	594	26.78%
1928	1,387	61.10%	869	38.28%	14	0.62%
1932	1,050	39.61%	1,554	58.62%	47	1.77%
1936	1,435	49.47%	1,437	49.53%	29	1.00%
1940	1,778	59.56%	1,195	40.03%	12	0.40%
1944	1,521	63.48%	865	36.10%	10	0.42%
1948	1,405	60.15%	905	38.74%	26	1.11%
1952	1,691	62.56%	1,010	37.37%	2	0.07%
1956	1,724	65.28%	913	34.57%	4	0.15%
1960	1,457	55.63%	1,160	44.29%	2	0.08%
1964	1,131	45.42%	1,359	54.58%	0	0.00%
1968	1,351	53.93%	988	39.44%	166	6.63%
1972	1,665	59.74%	1,112	39.90%	10	0.36%
1976	1,572	53.13%	1,344	45.42%	43	1.45%
1980	1,959	57.38%	1,158	33.92%	297	8.70%
1984	1,912	56.02%	1,487	43.57%	14	0.41%
1988	1,516	48.30%	1,601	51.00%	22	0.70%
1992	969	29.29%	1,574	47.58%	765	23.13%
1996	987	35.71%	1,425	51.56%	352	12.74%
2000	1,437	45.20%	1,657	52.12%	85	2.67%
2004	1,623	48.42%	1,704	50.84%	25	0.75%
2008	1,378	41.23%	1,900	56.85%	64	1.92%
2012	1,502	47.79%	1,559	49.60%	82	2.61%
2016	1,767	56.78%	1,147	36.86%	198	6.36%
2020	1,993	58.70%	1,338	39.41%	64	1.89%
2024	2,014	60.16%	1,254	37.46%	80	2.39%

== Education ==
K-12 school districts which cover portions of the county include Henry-Senachwine Consolidated Unit School District 5 and Putnam County Community Unit School District 535. Additionally, two small portions are in the Princeton Elementary School District 115 and the Princeton High School District 500.

== See also ==
- National Register of Historic Places listings in Putnam County
- Putnam County, New York
