= National Register of Historic Places listings in Stephenson County, Illinois =

Location of Stephenson County in Illinois

This is a list of the National Register of Historic Places listings in Stephenson County, Illinois.

This is intended to be a complete list of the properties and districts on the National Register of Historic Places in Stephenson County, Illinois, United States. Latitude and longitude coordinates are provided for many National Register properties and districts; these locations may be seen together in a map.

There are 16 properties and districts listed on the National Register in the county, and two former listings.

This National Park Service list is complete through NPS recent listings posted July 31, 2026.

== Current listings ==
| | Name on the Register | Image | Date listed | Location | City or town | Description |
|---|---|---|---|---|---|---|
| 1 | John H. Addams Homestead | John H. Addams Homestead | April 17, 1979 (#79000871) | 425 N. Mill St. 42°23′26″N 89°38′16″W | Cedarville | |
| 2 | AF and AM Lodge 687, Orangeville | AF and AM Lodge 687, Orangeville | May 9, 2003 (#03000354) | 203 W. High St. 42°28′06″N 89°38′44″W | Orangeville | |
| 3 | James Bruce Round Barn | James Bruce Round Barn | February 23, 1984 (#84001157) | S of Freeport; 42°15′07″N 89°38′57″W | Freeport | |
| 4 | Central House | Central House | May 20, 1999 (#99000585) | 210 W. High St. 42°28′09″N 89°38′47″W | Orangeville | |
| 5 | Charles Fehr Round Barn | Charles Fehr Round Barn | February 23, 1984 (#84001152) | NE of Orangeville; 42°29′46″N 89°31′20″W | Orangeville | |
| 6 | Gerald Harbach Round Barn | Gerald Harbach Round Barn | February 23, 1984 (#84001155) | US 20; 42°19′40″N 89°44′04″W | Eleroy | |
| 7 | Chris Jensen Round Barn | | February 23, 1984 (#84001150) | 11723 W. Galena Rd. 42°23′30″N 89°50′06″W | Lena | Demolished |
| 8 | Kellogg's Grove | Kellogg's Grove | June 23, 1978 (#78001191) | SE of Kent; 42°17′46″N 89°53′13″W | Kent | |
| 9 | Lena Water Tower | Lena Water Tower | February 20, 1997 (#97000034) | 201 Vernon St. 42°22′49″N 89°49′41″W | Lena | |
| 10 | Dennis Otte Round Barn | Dennis Otte Round Barn | February 23, 1984 (#84001164) | E of Eleroy; 42°20′01″N 89°44′16″W | Eleroy | |
| 11 | People's State Bank | People's State Bank | August 20, 2004 (#04000868) | 300 W. High St. 42°28′15″N 89°38′49″W | Orangeville | |
| 12 | William Ritzman House | William Ritzman House | October 27, 2000 (#00000949) | 10715 IL 26 N 42°27′33″N 89°38′30″W | Orangeville | |
| 13 | Soldiers' Monument | Soldiers' Monument | June 1, 1998 (#98000461) | 15 N. Galena Ave. 42°17′52″N 89°37′19″W | Freeport | |
| 14 | Stephenson County Courthouse | Stephenson County Courthouse | January 17, 1974 (#74002284) | Courthouse Sq. 42°17′53″N 89°37′19″W | Freeport | Demolished; the building shown is the new courthouse, which was built on the site of the old one |
| 15 | Oscar Taylor House | Oscar Taylor House | May 11, 1984 (#84001165) | 1440 S. Carroll Ave. 42°17′04″N 89°36′54″W | Freeport | |
| 16 | Union House | Union House | May 11, 2000 (#00000472) | 207 W. High St. 42°28′06″N 89°38′45″W | Orangeville | |

== Former listing ==
| | Name on the Register | Image | Date listed | Date removed | Location | City or town | Description |
|---|---|---|---|---|---|---|---|
| 1 | Clyde Leek Round Barn | | February 23, 1984 (#84001161) | December 8, 1995 | N Dakota Rd. | Dakota | |
| 2 | Freeport City Hall | Freeport City Hall | June 7, 2016 (#16000329) | January 2, 2020 | 230 W. Stephenson St. 42°17′51″N 89°37′24″W | Freeport | |

== See also ==
- List of National Historic Landmarks in Illinois
- National Register of Historic Places listings in Illinois
