= Lobdell =

Lobdell is a surname. Notable people with the surname include:

- Jared Lobdell (1937–2019), American author
- Joe Lobdell (born 1983), American football player
- Scott Lobdell (born 1963), American comic book writer and screenwriter
- Frank Lobdell (1912-2013), American painter

== Other ==
- Lobdell, an unincorporated community in West Baton Rouge Parish, Louisiana
