= Boeke =

Boeke is a surname. Notable people with the surname include:

- Harry Boeke (1883–1936), American businessman and politician
- Jet Boeke (born 1948), Dutch children's author
- Jim Boeke (1938–2014), American football player
- Kees Boeke (1884–1966), Dutch educator
- Kees Boeke (musician) (born 1950), Dutch musician

== See also ==
- Mongolian wrestling
