= Gennings Dunker =

American football player (born 2003)

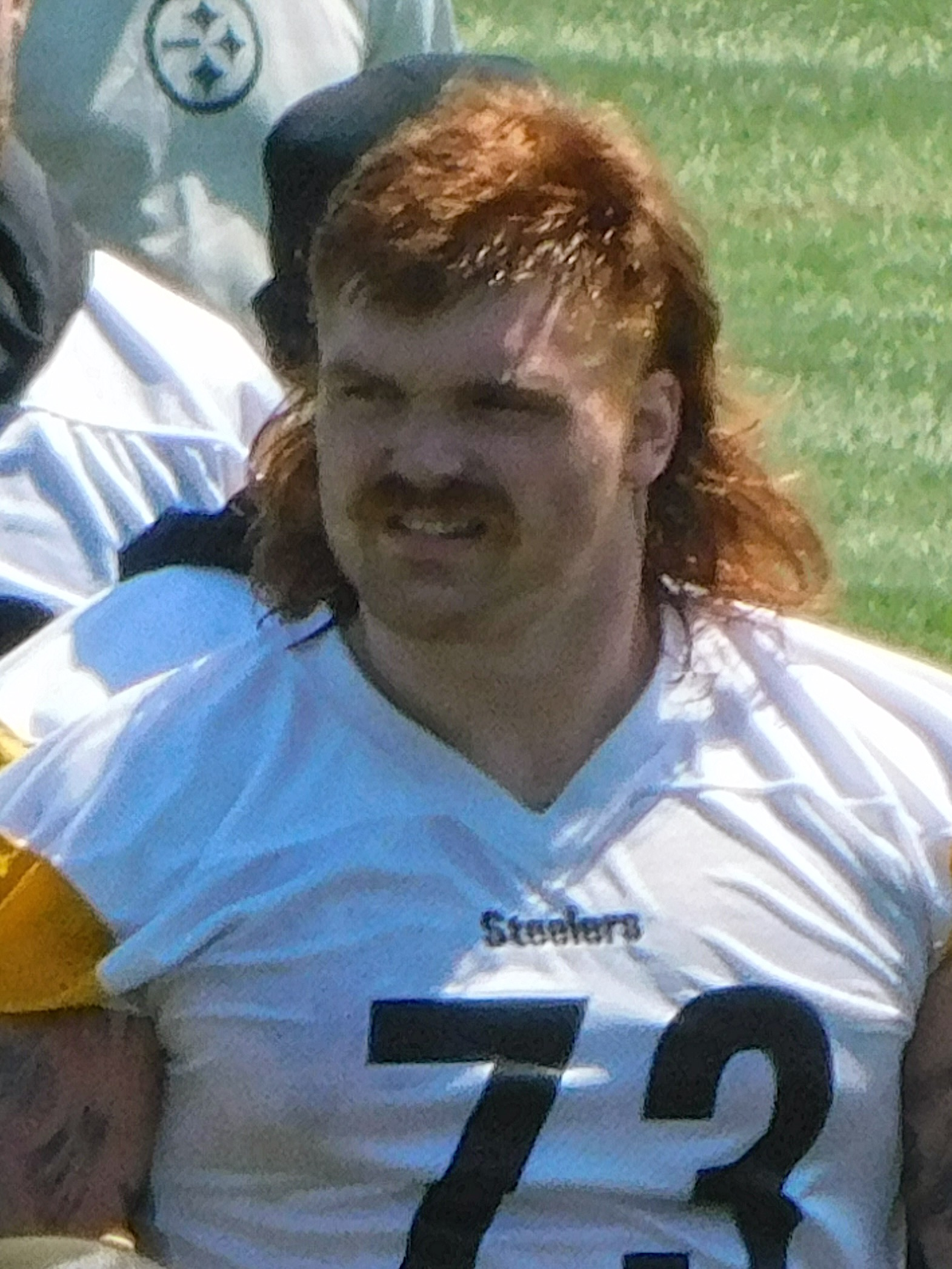
- Dunker in 2026

No. 73 – Pittsburgh Steelers
- Position: Offensive guard
- Roster status: Injured reserve/designated for return

Personal information
- Born: May 8, 2003 (age 23); Norwalk, Iowa, U.S.
- Listed height: 6 ft 5 in (1.96 m)
- Listed weight: 319 lb (145 kg)

Career information
- High school: Lena-Winslow (Lena, Illinois)
- College: Iowa (2021–2025)
- NFL draft: 2026: 3rd round, 96th overall pick

Career history
- Pittsburgh Steelers (2026–present)

Awards and highlights
- Joe Moore Award (2025) (Note: As part of the Iowa Hawkeyes offensive line); First-team All-Big Ten (2025); Second-team All-Big Ten (2024)
- Stats at Pro Football Reference

Gennings Michael Dunker (born May 8, 2003) is an American professional football offensive guard for the Pittsburgh Steelers of the National Football League (NFL). He played college football for the Iowa Hawkeyes and was selected by the Steelers in the third round of the 2026 NFL draft.

== Early life ==
Gennings Dunker was born on May 8, 2003 in Norwalk, Iowa. He grew up in the Des Moines area before moving to Lena, Illinois with his family when he was eight years old. Dunker played youth football in Dakota, Illinois, as his hometown of Lena had no youth leagues. Dunker attended Lena-Winslow High School in Lena, and later committed to play for the University of Iowa.

== College career ==
After redshirting his first year in 2021, Dunker played in 12 games with one start in 2022. As a sophomore in 2023, he became a starter and started all 13 games at right tackle. As a junior in 2024, he started 11 games, missing two due to injury. Dunker returned to Iowa for his senior year in 2025,, starting all 13 games and earning first-team All-Big Ten honors while the Iowa offensive line received the Joe Moore Award. He started 38 games during his career at Iowa.

== Professional career ==
Pre-draft measurables
| Height | Weight | Arm length | Hand span | Wingspan | 40-yard dash | 10-yard split | 20-yard split | 20-yard shuttle | Three-cone drill | Vertical jump | Broad jump | Bench press |
|---|---|---|---|---|---|---|---|---|---|---|---|---|
| 6 ft 5 in (1.96 m) | 319 lb (145 kg) | 33 1/2 in (0.85 m) | 10 in (0.25 m) | 6 ft 10 1/8 in (2.09 m) | 5.18 s | 1.83 s | 3.03 s | 4.63 s | 7.58 s | 32.5 in (0.83 m) | 9 ft 0 in (2.74 m) | 29 reps |
All values from NFL Combine/Pro Day

Dunker was selected by the Pittsburgh Steelers in the third round, 96th overall, of the 2026 NFL draft.
