= Oneco, Illinois =

Oneco
- Unincorporated community
- Location of Oneco within Illinois Oneco (the United States)
- Coordinates: 42°29′15″N 89°39′51″W
- Country: United States
- State: Illinois
- County: Stephenson
- Township: Oneco
- Elevation: 840 ft (260 m)
- Time zone: UTC-6 (CST)
  - Summer (DST): UTC-5 (CDT)
- Zip code: 61060
- Area code: 815
- GNIS feature ID: 415121

Oneco is an unincorporated community in Stephenson County, Illinois, and is located along IL Rt. 26, north of Freeport.

== Geography ==
Oneco is north of Freeport off Illinois Route 26 approximately 1-1/4 miles south of the Wisconsin-Illinois border, and is also one mile north of Orangeville. Oneco is in the Orangeville Community Unit School district.

== History ==
This small town was settled in its present place because it was at the bottom of a basin, which helped protect them from the harsh winter winds. Native Americans came and helped settle the village, in an attempt to make peace with the settlers and have shelter for the winter as well.
