= Central House (Orangeville, Illinois) =

- U.S. National Register of Historic Places
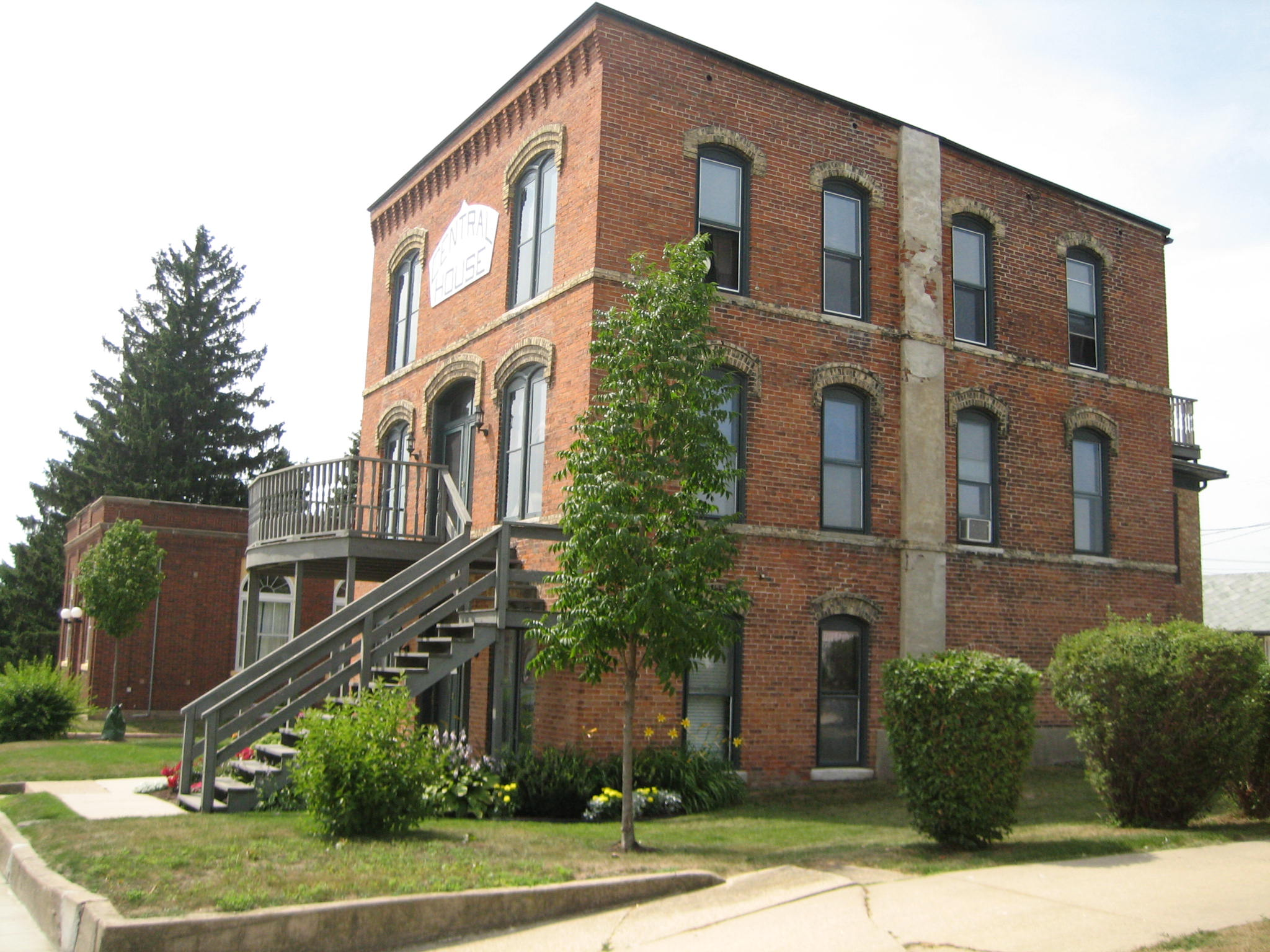
- Front and side of the Central House

- Location within Illinois Location within the United States
- Location: 210 W. High St., Orangeville, Illinois
- Coordinates: 42°28′9″N 89°38′47″W
- Area: less than one acre
- Architect: John Bower
- Architectural style: Italianate
- NRHP reference No.: 99000585
- Added to NRHP: May 20, 1999

Central House is an 1860s hotel building located in the 800-person village of Orangeville, in Stephenson County, Illinois, United States. The building was built by Orangeville founder John Bower and operated as a hotel from its construction until the 1930s, when it was converted for use as a single family residence. The three-story building was the first commercial brick structure in downtown Orangeville. Architecturally, the building is cast in a mid-19th-century Italianate style. Central House was added to the U.S. National Register of Historic Places in 1999.

== Location ==
Central House stands at a T-intersection in the central business district of the 800 person village of Orangeville, Illinois, United States. Orangeville, in Stephenson County, is about two miles (3.2 km) from the Illinois–Wisconsin border. High Street slopes uphill from the Richland Creek and is populated by historic, 19th-century buildings. At the summit of High Street's slope is the Central House]. In total, four of the five structures on the National Register of Historic Places in Orangeville, are found along High Street; the Union House, People's State Bank and the Orangeville Masonic Hall are the other two. Other historic buildings in the approximately three block area include the 1888 Musser Building, and the 1906 Wagner Building.

== History ==
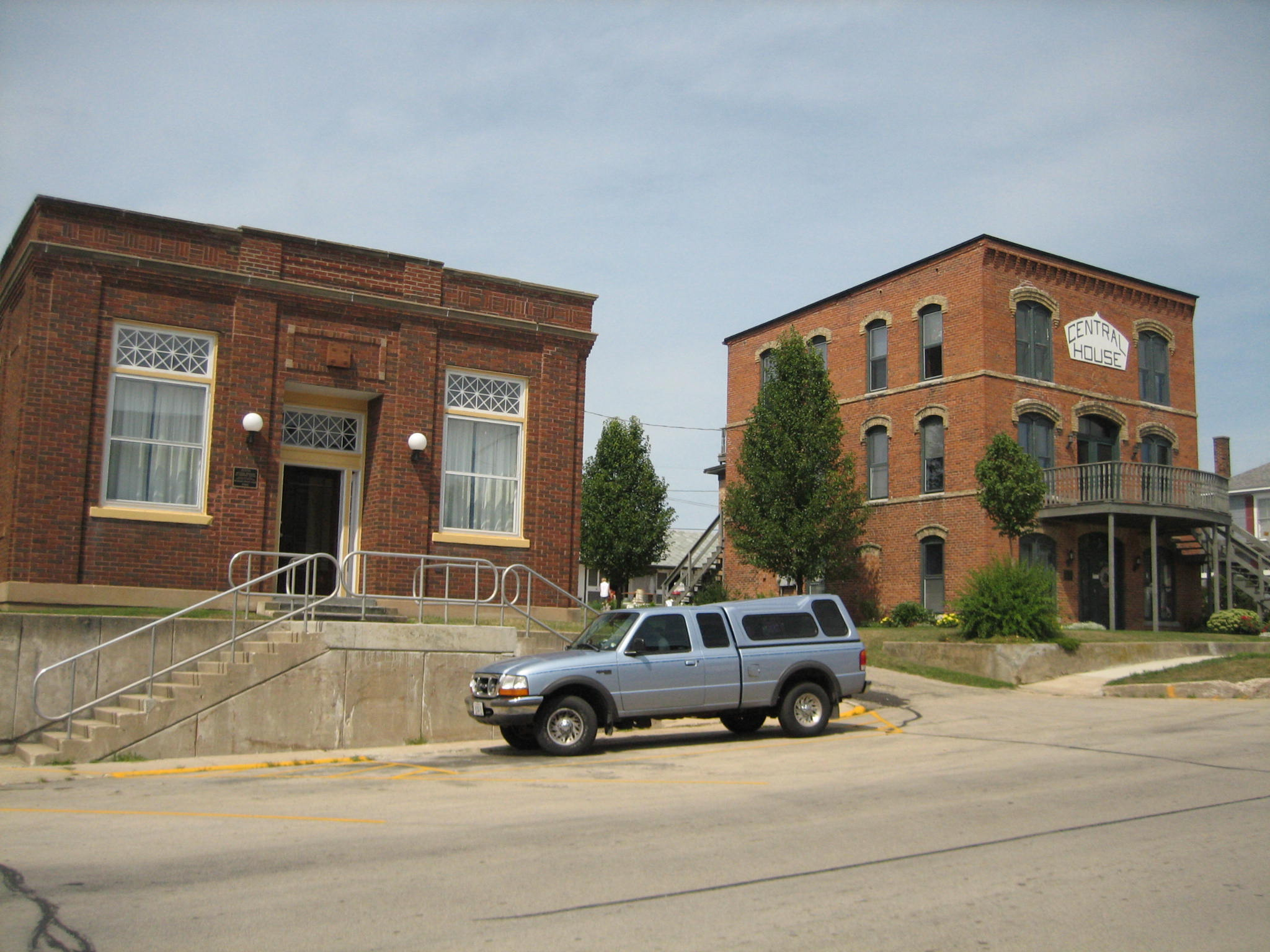
The People's State Bank, next door to the Central House.

Central House was constructed in 1888, by John Hoyman, the son in law of town founder John Bower. John Bower had initially built a hotel at the same site in 1867, but it burned to the ground in 1887. It was the first brick commercial building, and the second brick building to be built in Orangeville. From the time it was constructed, until the 1930s, Central House operated as a hotel. During the 1930s the building was converted for use as a single-family residence, a function it retains at present. Though Central House has undergone multiple periods of renovations and alterations it still maintains its historic integrity.

When the new hotel was built in 1888, the hotel affixed a large wooden sign adorned with "Central House" to the front facade; the original was removed during the 1920s. Before the turn of the 20th century the building's partial basement was added on. The home underwent several changes in 1911. They included: the addition of indoor plumbing, the construction of a 10-by-13-foot (3.0 by 4.0 m) utility room at the structure's rear, the construction of a separate kitchen building, and the removal of an attached shed on the west facade. Central House did not have electricity until 1920. The kitchen was moved to the main building during the 1940s, and between 1950 and 1952 the second floor balcony was removed. The heating system evolved from potbelly stoves to a radiator hot water system in the 1920s, and during the 1960s gas heaters replaced that system.

== Architecture ==
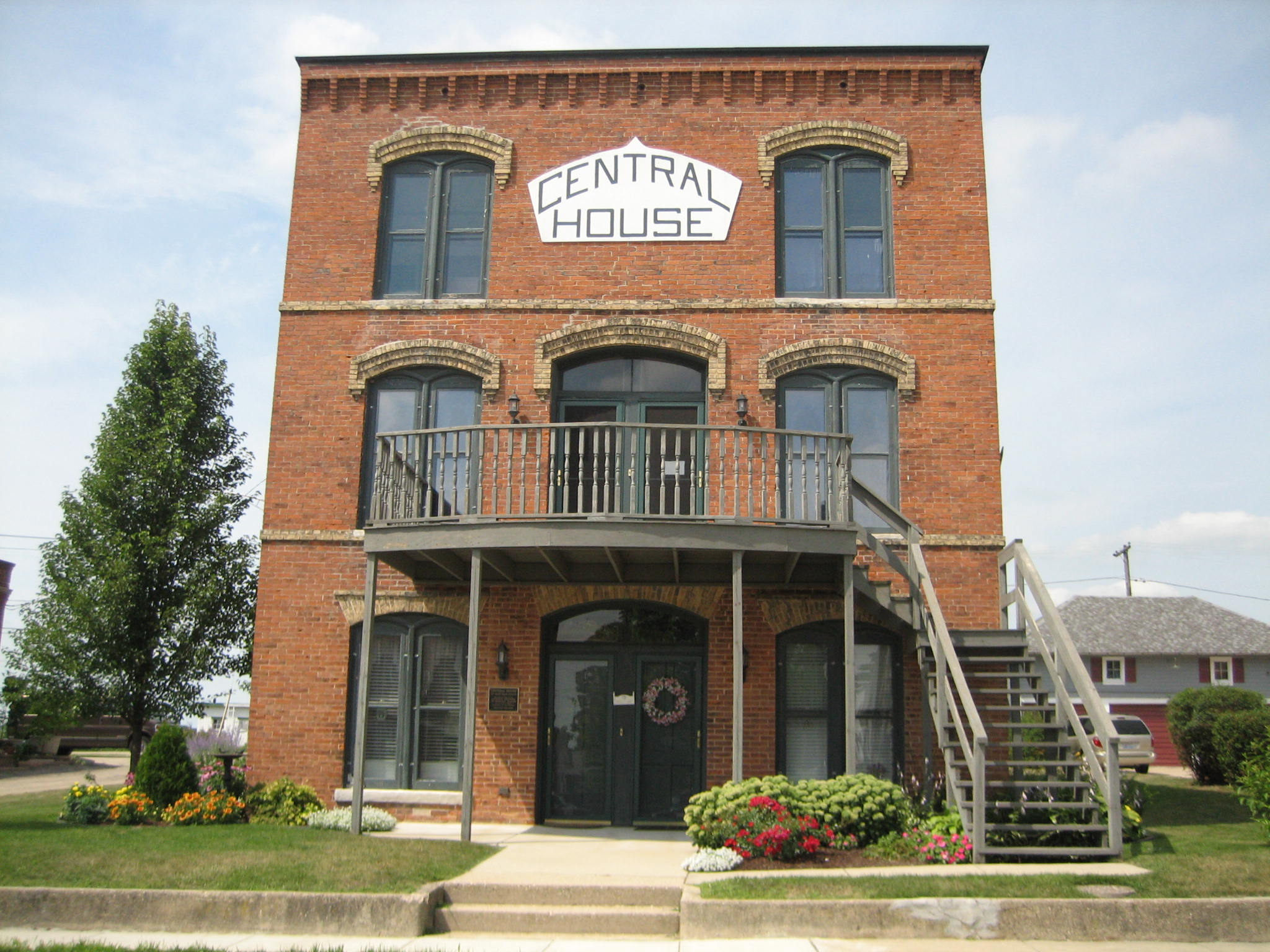
The original sign was removed during the 1920s and the original balcony removed in the 1950s.

The 28-by-33-foot (8.5 by 10.1 m) building stands three stories, and features a partial basement and twenty rooms. Ten of the rooms were specifically designed as bedrooms. The brick building sits on a stone foundation and is cast in a mid-19th-century Italianate style. The hotel building itself features arched segmented one over one windows on all facades and floors. The wooden-framed windows are either all original or could be restored to original appearance. The windows have shallow hood moldings made of soft brick and are all double hung. The original porch and balcony, removed for reasons unknown during the 1950s, measured 18 feet (5.5 m) across and 10 feet (3 m) deep. The property of the Central House has one outbuilding, a five-bay garage that dates to around the 1910s. The garage has had one roof replacement but maintains its historic integrity.

== Significance ==
Central House is commercially significant for its role as a meeting place for citizens of Orangeville and travelers alike. It provided lodging and dining facilities for more than 60 years, and its construction was with the intention of being the central commercial building in Orangeville. The building remains one of the oldest surviving buildings in Orangeville and is the village's only hotel in its history. It is also the only three-story building within the Orangeville central business district. For its local significance in the area of architecture the building was added to the U.S. National Register of Historic Places on May 20, 1999.

== See also ==
- Charles Fehr Round Barn
