= Oneco Township, Illinois =

Oneco Township
- Township
- Location in Stephenson County
- Coordinates: 42°29′08″N 89°39′47″W
- Country: United States
- State: Illinois
- County: Stephenson

Government
  - Supervisor: James R. Setterstrom

Area
  - Total: 27.44 sq mi (71.1 km^{2})
  - Land: 27.44 sq mi (71.1 km^{2})
  - Water: 0 sq mi (0 km^{2}) 0%
- Elevation: 823 ft (251 m)

Population (2010)
  - Estimate (2016): 1,270
  - Density: 48.5/sq mi (18.7/km^{2})
- Time zone: UTC-6 (CST)
  - Summer (DST): UTC-5 (CDT)
- FIPS code: 17-177-56120

Oneco Township is located in Stephenson County, Illinois. As of the 2010 census, its population was 1,331 and it contained 587 housing units. The village of Orangeville, and the unincorporated community of Oneco are located in this township.

== Geography ==
Oneco is Township 29 North, Range 7 and 8 (part) East of the Fourth Principal Meridian.

According to the 2010 census, the township has a total area of 27.44 square miles (71.1 km^{2}), all land.

== Demographics ==
Historical population
Census	Pop.	Note	%±
2016 (est.)	1,270
U.S. Decennial Census
