= AF and AM Lodge 687 =

Building in Illinois, United States

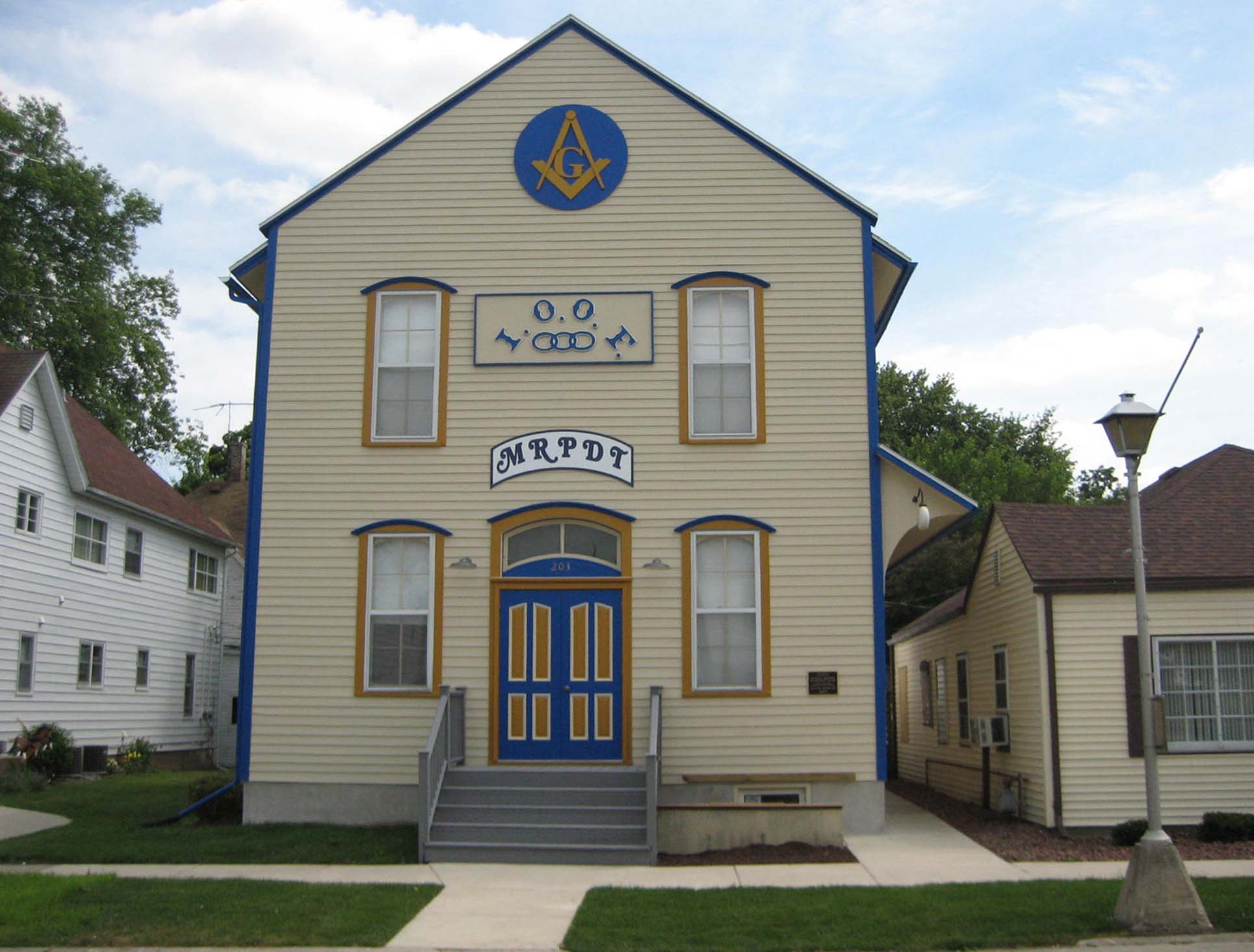
- Interactive map of the AF and AM Lodge 687 area

General information
- Architectural style: Italianate
- Location: 203 West High Street, Orangeville, Stephenson County, Illinois, Orangeville, USA
- Completed: 1896
- Renovated: 1903

Technical details
- Floor count: 3
- AF and AM Lodge 687, Orangeville
- U.S. National Register of Historic Places
- Location within Illinois Location within the United States
- Coordinates: 42.4685°N 89.6457°W
- Area: less than one acre
- Built: 1896; 1900
- Architectural style: Italianate
- NRHP reference No.: 03000354
- Added to NRHP: May 9, 2003

The Ancient Free and Accepted Masons Lodge 687 (AF and AM), also known as the Independent Order of Odd Fellows J.R. Scruggs Lodge 372, is a building constructed in 1876 as a Masonic Hall. It is located in downtown Orangeville, Illinois, United States, a small village in Stephenson County. The building, originally built by the local Masonic Lodge, was bought by the locally more numerous Independent Order of Oddfellows fraternal organization in 1893. The building has served all of Orangeville's fraternal organizations for more than 125 years, from the time it was built. The two-story, front gabled building has Italianate architecture elements. It had a rear wing added to it in 1903. By 2003, the first floor has been returned to use as a community center, holding dinner theatre and other community functions, much as the building had originally served the community until first floor space was rented out for commercial use in the late 19th century. The building was listed on the U.S. National Register of Historic Places in 2003. The building is the home of the Mighty Richmond Players Dinner Theatre (MRPDT) dinner theatre which seats 54 persons and has scheduled four different productions for the 2010 season. A $150,000 renovation of the building was recently completed. The building was listed on the National Register of Historic Places as AF and AM Lodge 687, Orangeville in 2003.

== Location ==
The building is located in the central business district, along High and Main Streets, of the 800 person village of Orangeville, Illinois, United States. Orangeville is located about two mile (3 km) away from the Illinois–Wisconsin border, in Stephenson County. The Masonic Hall is one lot west of the intersection of High Street and East Street, High Street is the main thoroughfare through downtown Orangeville. The lot, on the south side of West High Street, is east, across the alley from John Bower's house, the Union House. Along with Union House, and the Masonic Hall, four of five sites in Orangeville listed on the U.S. National Register of Historic Places are found on High Street.

High Street slopes uphill from the Richland Creek and is populated by historic, 19th-century buildings. At the summit of High Street's slope is the Central House, which is another of the High Street structures listed on the National Register. The other listing is the 1926 People's State Bank. Other historic buildings in the approximately three block area include the 1888 Musser Building, and the 1906 Wagner Building.

== History ==
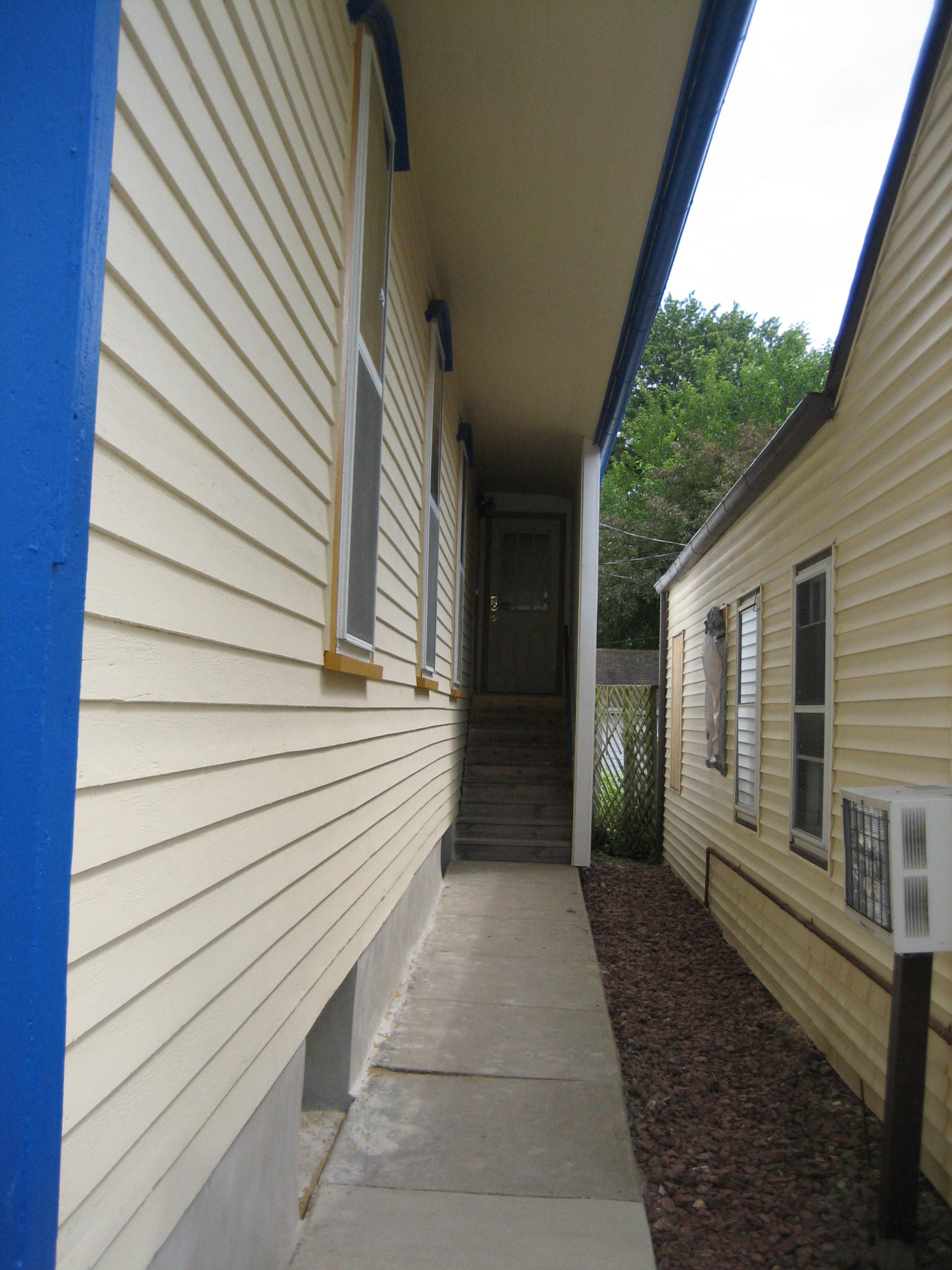
The overhang along the west facade was added in 1903

The original (front) portion of the building was constructed in 1876 and has a full basement. Several alterations were made in 1903 including the addition of large rear wing to the building as well as an overhang above the first floor windows along the entire length of the west facade. The building was originally constructed to serve as the meeting hall for the local Ancient Free and Accepted Masons Lodge (AF and AM), but from its opening it has always been utilized by all of Orangeville's fraternal organizations. The AF and AM Lodge 687 of Orangeville built the building at a cost of US$2,500 just four years after the chapter was organized in 1872.

The Independent Order of Oddfellows, J.R. Scruggs Lodge 372 (IOOF) had met in the hall since its construction and began to experience and upswing in membership while the AF and AM membership was declining. In 1893 the Masons sold the hall to the IOOF for $1,800, though they continued to rent the building and meet there as they had before.

== Architecture ==
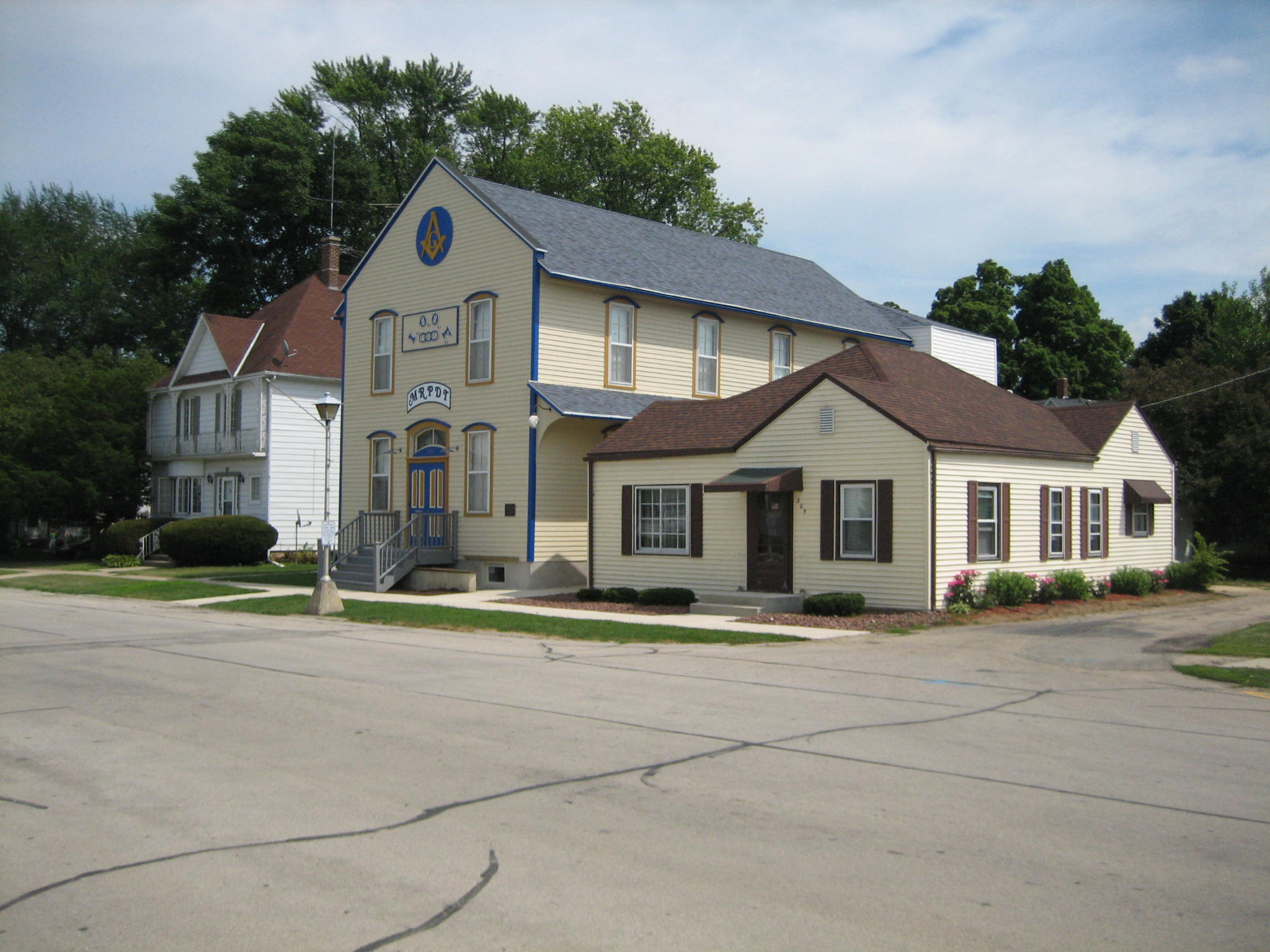
The two-story front gabled lodge viewed from in front of the People's State Bank

The lodge is a two-story front gabled structure which features two rectangular sections. The first, and original section measures 45 by 30 feet (13.7 by 9.1 m) and the 1903 addition at the rear measures 15 by 32 feet (4.6 by 9.8 m); both sections are rectangular. The wooden building is clad in clapboard and stand on a fieldstone foundation, paint scrapings indicate the building had always been white, until recently.

== Significance ==
The AF and AM Lodge in Orangeville has served the area for more than 125 years as a social meeting place for different fraternal organizations. From the time it was constructed to the present, the Orangeville Masonic Hall has served its intended function. For its role in the social history of and as an entertainment and recreation facility, the AF and AM Lodge 687 building was added to the U.S. National Register of Historic Places on May 9, 2003.
