= People's State Bank (Orangeville, Illinois) =

- U.S. National Register of Historic Places
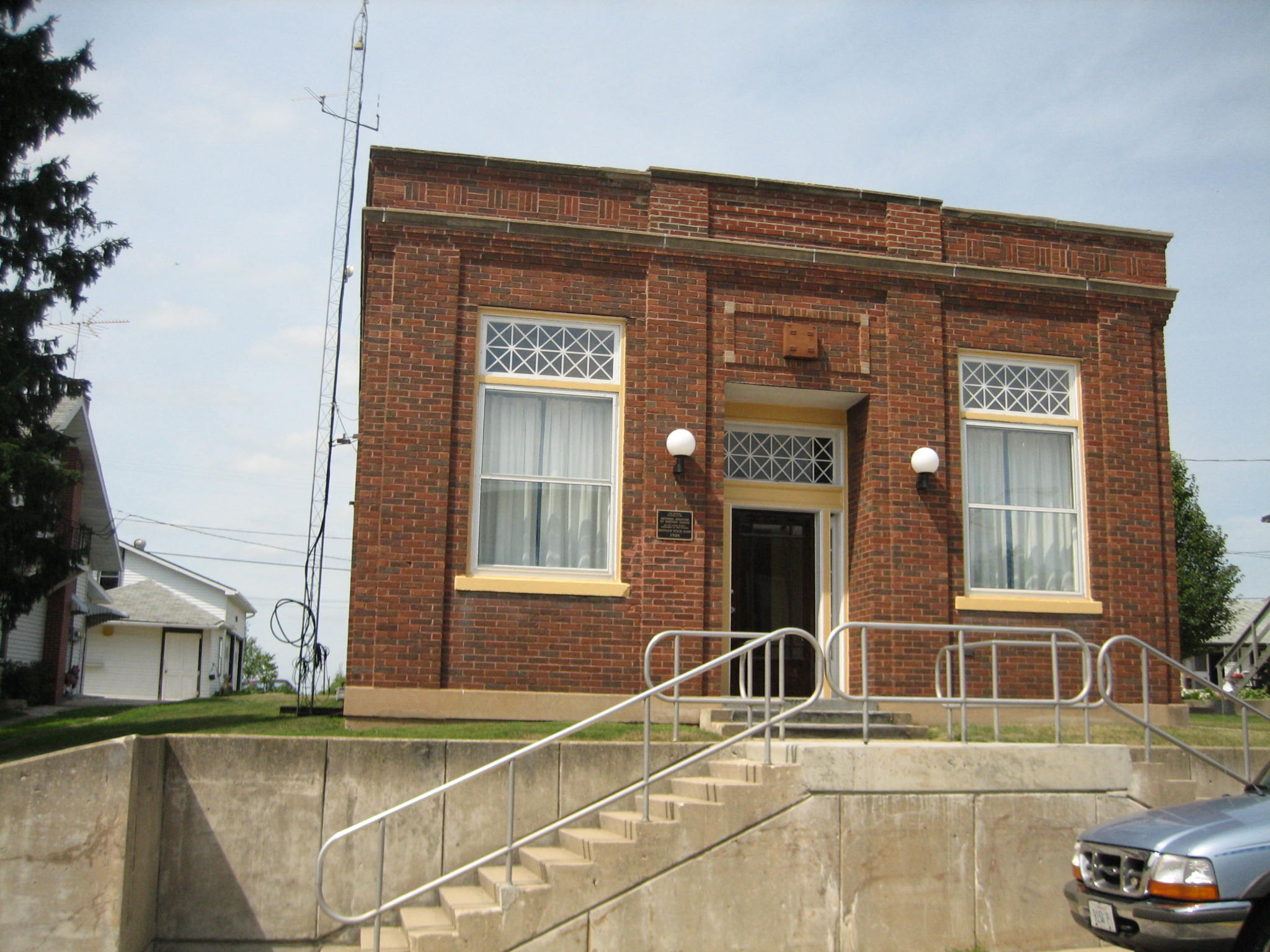

- Location within Illinois Location within the United States
- Location: 300 W. High St., Orangeville, Illinois
- Coordinates: 42°28′7″N 89°38′41″W
- Area: less than one acre
- Built: 1926
- Architectural style: Commercial style, Classical Revival
- NRHP reference No.: 04000868
- Added to NRHP: August 20, 2004

The People's State Bank building is located in the Stephenson County village of Orangeville, Illinois, United States. The structure was erected in 1926 when two Orangeville banks merged to form the People's State Bank. It operated until 1932 when it became overwhelmed by an economic disaster caused by the Great Depression and the bypassing of downtown Orangeville by an important route. The building is cast in the Commercial style and features Classical Revival detailing, common for banks of the time period. The building was added to the U.S. National Register of Historic Places in 2004.

== Location ==
The People's State Bank is located in the 800 person village of Orangeville, about two miles (3 km) from the Illinois–Wisconsin border in Stephenson County, Illinois. The building is located in the primary business district, along High and Main Streets, in downtown Orangeville. High Street slopes uphill from the Richland Creek and is populated by historic, 19th-century buildings. At the summit of High Street's slope is the Central House, which is listed on the National Register of Historic Places. In total, four of the five structures on the National Register in Orangeville, are found along High Street; the Union House and the Orangeville Masonic Hall are the other two. Other historic buildings in the approximately three block area include the 1888 Musser Building, and the 1906 Wagner Building.

== History ==
The People's State Bank building was constructed in 1926 when two of the three state banks in Orangeville merged. The area had enjoyed success as a commercial hub in the years preceding the bank's construction. In 1928, just before the onset of the Great Depression, Illinois State Highway 74 (later Illinois Route 26) was rerouted through the eastern part of Orangeville, bypassing the downtown business district. Though the district no longer had a major thoroughfare passing through it many of the business were able to survive, at least initially. By 1928 the decline in the business community of Orangeville was evident; the bypass, coupled with the depression continued to negatively affect the village. In 1932 the People's State Bank, the last open bank in Orangeville, closed its doors.

The American Legion Post #720 bought the bank building after its closure and it served as the American Legion Meeting Hall until 1956. A group of local residents purchased the building in 1956 with the intention of restarting a bank in Orangeville. Until 1980, the People's State Bank building once again operated as a financial institution under the name Orangeville Community Bank. A radio repair and sales business bought the structure in 1980 and held it until the business closed, leaving the premises vacant, in August 2002. An organization called A Community Together bought the bank from the radio business and in turn sold it to John and Caryl Buford in October 2003.

== Architecture ==
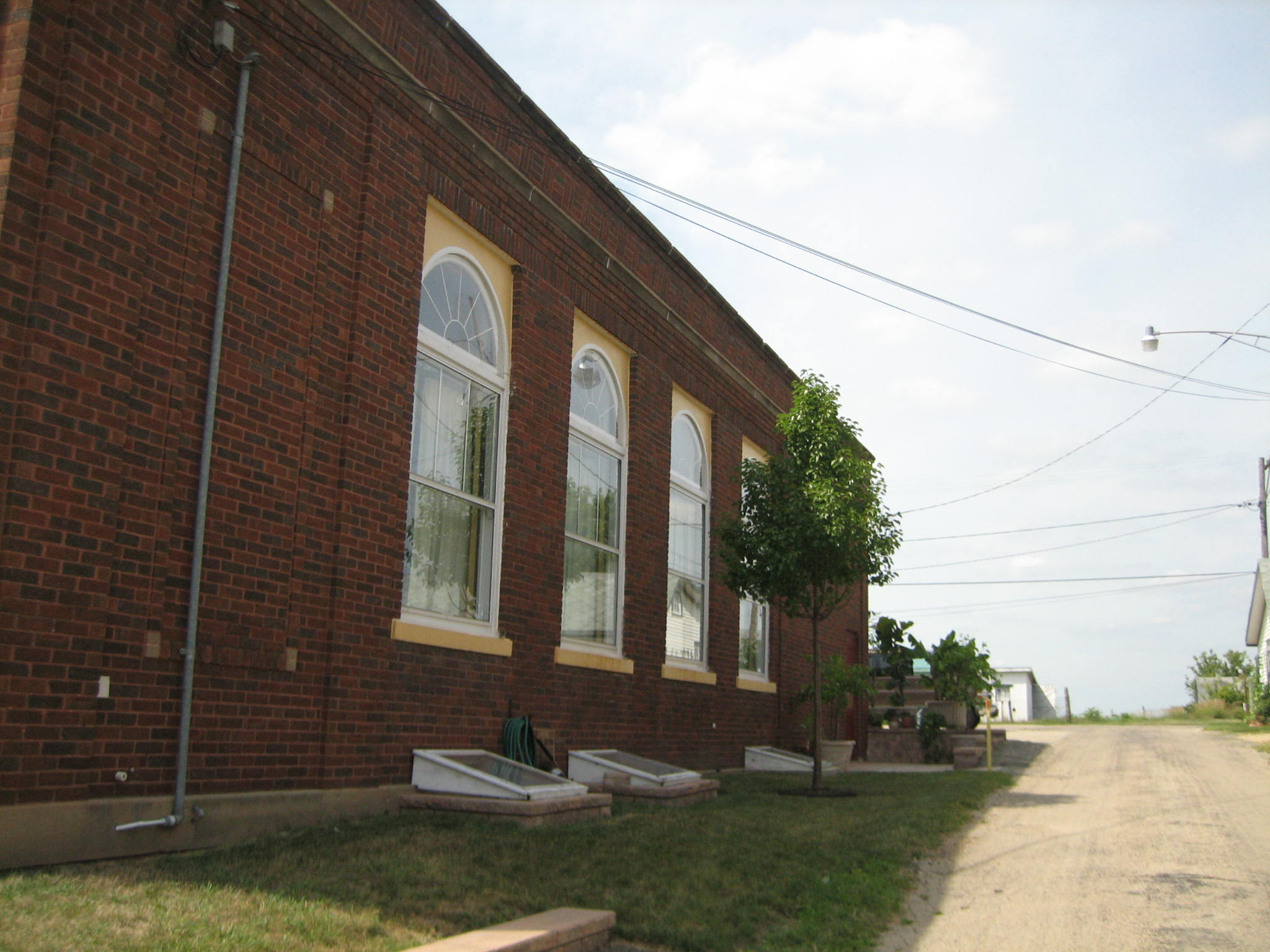
The semi-circular fanlight windows and the brick divides, which resemble pilasters, are among the Classical Revival details in the building.

The People's State Bank was cast in the commercial style of architecture and has detailing heavily influenced by Classical Revival, a popular style for bank buildings at the time. The building, a one-story structure, stands on a concrete foundation with 12 inch (30 cm) thick walls, and a full basement. The Classical detailing is emphasized through the use of brick, glass, and concrete throughout the building. The simple design exhibits several Classical Revival influences, among them: its masonry construction, giving it a sturdy appearance, its symmetry, the brick divides on the wall which resemble pilasters, and the semi circular fanlights on the above the east and west facade windows. The size of the interior lobby further emphasized the feeling of solidity, which banks wished to convey to their customers.

The 30 foot (9 m) by 64 foot (20 m) rectangular building is composed of brick and features terrazzo flooring. The building is the most ornate of the commercial buildings in downtown Orangeville and is situated on the area's second highest lot. The main entrance, a large wooden, glass paneled door, is recessed and central on the symmetrical south (front) facade of the building. The original door is surrounded by sidelights and topped by a diamond patterned transom window. Flanking the central doorway on each side is a one over one window, each displaying the same diamond patterned transoms as the door.

== Significance ==
The People's State Bank was the last major commercial building constructed in historic downtown Orangeville, Illinois. Prior to World War II Classical architecture was popular in commercial and civic buildings and the People's State Bank provides an example of a one-story, stand alone commercial style block building adorned with Classical details. For its architectural significance the People's State Bank building was listed on the U.S. National Register of Historic Places on August 20, 2004.

== See also ==
- Charles Fehr Round Barn
- Union House
