= Freeport City Hall =

- Formerly listed on the U.S. National Register of Historic Places
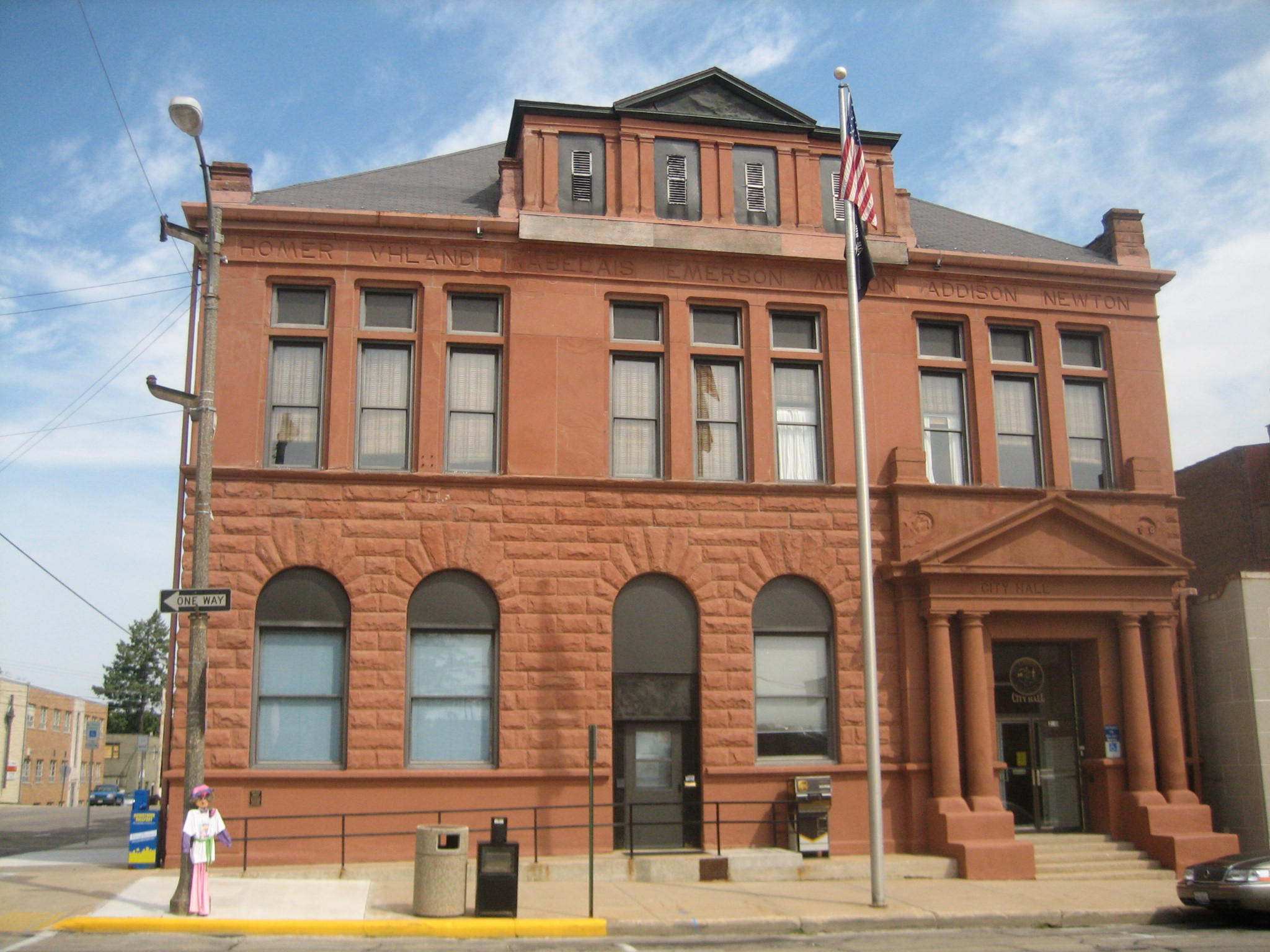

- Location within Illinois Location within the United States
- Location: 230 W. Stephenson St., Freeport, Illinois
- Coordinates: 42°17′51″N 89°37′24″W
- Built: 1899
- Architect: David S. Schureman
- Architectural style: Richardsonian Romanesque
- NRHP reference No.: 16000329

Significant dates
- Added to NRHP: June 7, 2016
- Removed from NRHP: January 2, 2020

The Freeport City Hall, located at 230 West Stephenson Street, was the historic city hall of Freeport, Illinois.

== History ==
The city hall was built in 1899 to replace the previous city hall, which the city built in 1868 and had outgrown. The city hall served the city continuously from its opening until 2011, when city government moved elsewhere due to safety issues; it also held the city's police and fire departments for a time. It was also the site of several civil rights milestones for the city, as its first African-American alderman was elected and its first African-American police officer hired during the building's tenure.

The building was added to the National Register of Historic Places on June 7, 2016.

After moving out of the city hall the local government attempted to sell the property but was unsuccessful. In December 2018, the building was demolished. It was delisted from the National Register in 2020.

== Design and construction ==
Architect David S. Schureman designed the Richardsonian Romanesque building; his design included a red stone exterior, a barrel ceiling decorated with frescoes, and a main staircase with an iron balustrade. The building's frieze lists the names of important figures in science and literature; the first letters of each name spell out Schureman's name, a loophole he exploited when city leaders denied his request to put his name on the cornerstone.
