= William Ritzman House =

Historic house in Illinois, United States

- U.S. National Register of Historic Places
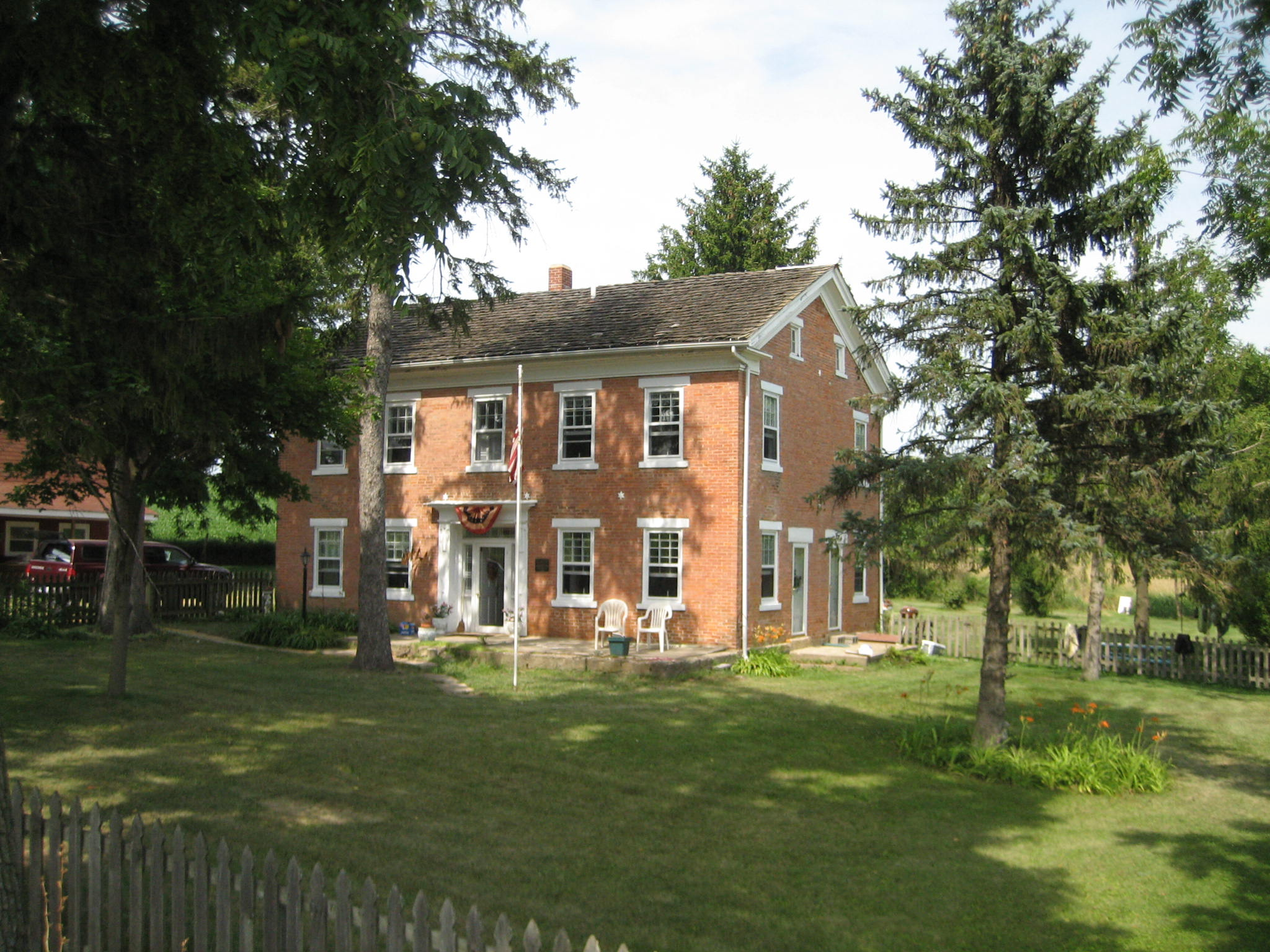
- Front of the house

- Location within Illinois Location within the United States
- Interactive map showing the location of William Ritzman House
- Location: 10715 Illinois Route 26, N., Orangeville, Illinois
- Coordinates: 42°27′33″N 89°38′30″W
- Area: less than one acre
- Built: 1847
- Architectural style: Greek Revival
- NRHP reference No.: 00000949
- Added to NRHP: October 27, 2000

The William Ritzman House is a historic house just outside the corporate village limits of Orangeville, Illinois. The house was built around 1847 and is of brick construction in the Greek Revival style. It was added to the U.S. National Register of Historic Places in 2000.

== History ==
The William Ritzman House was built in around 1847 by settler William Ritzman, originally from Union County, Pennsylvania. Ritzman was a lieutenant during the Mexican War and eventually became one of Orangeville's leading citizens. Beginning in 1974 the house underwent a restoration that lasted more than 25 years and returned the house to its original state.

== Architecture ==
The Greek Revival Ritzman House was built by an unknown contractor during a time period when Greek Revival style was becoming popular in the Midwest. The brick Ritzman House incorporates several elements common to Greek Revival structures including: a low-pitch gable roof, cornice lines with a wide trim band, and an elaborate door surround with a narrow transom line and sidelights. The Ritzman House belongs to a class of Greek Revival homes that lack front porches, this occurs in about 20 percent of residential Greek Revival architecture.

== Historic significance ==
The Ritzman House is a locally significant example of Greek Revival architecture. It maintains a high degree of architectural integrity despite undergoing many changes through the years. During an architectural survey of area rural Greek Revival houses, the Ritzman house was one of 26 surveyed across ten small towns, and one of four considered "worthy of note". The William Ritzman House was added to the National Register of Historic Places October 23, 2000.

== Bibliography ==
- McAlester, Virginia & Lee. A Field Guide to American Houses, Alfred A. Knopf, Inc, New York: 1984, pp. 178–95, (ISBN 0394739698).
