= Harry Boeke =

American businessman and politician

Harry C. Boeke (September 28, 1883 – September 13, 1936) was an American businessman and politician.

Boeke was born in Lena, Illinois. He graduated from the Lena High School in 1902 and from Barlow Business School in 1904. Boeke lived in Freeport, Illinois and was involved in the insurance and real estate business. He served on the Freeport Board of Education and was a Democrat. Boeke served in the Illinois Senate from 1933 until his death in 1936. He died at his home, in Freeport, Illinois, from viridans streptococci, after being ill for several months.
