= Lena Water Tower =

- U.S. National Register of Historic Places
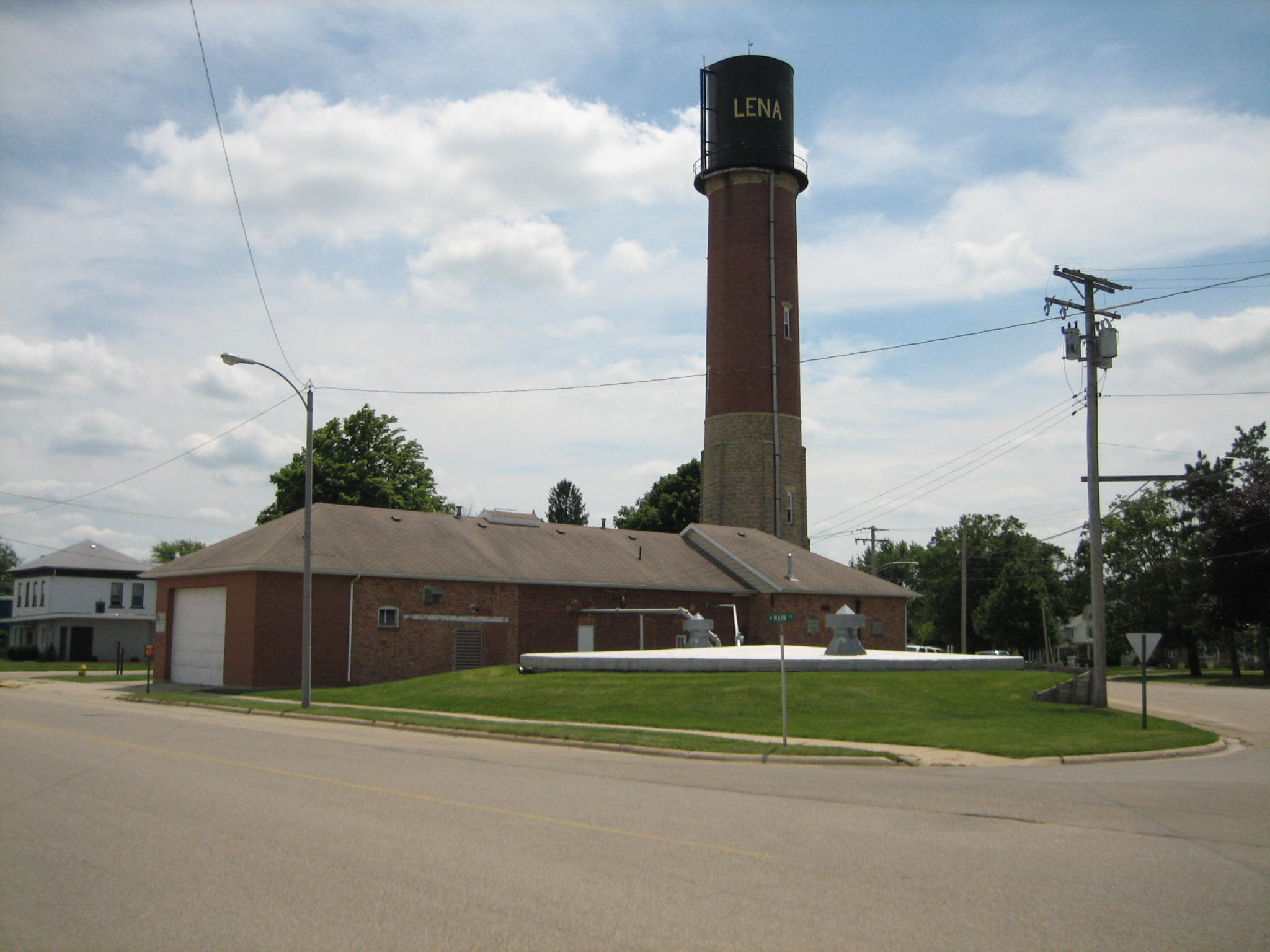
- Location: Lena, Stephenson County, Illinois, USA
- Coordinates: 42°22′51″N 89°49′37″W
- Area: <1 acre (0.4 ha)
- Built: 1896
- NRHP reference No.: 97000034
- Added to NRHP: February 20, 1997

The Lena Water Tower is a water tower located in the village of Lena, Illinois, United States. It was built in 1896 following two decades of problems with structure fires in the village. The current water tower is the result of a second attempt after the first structure proved to be unstable. The tower stands 122.5 feet (37.3 m) tall and is built of limestone and red brick. The current stainless steel water tank holds 50,000 gallons (190,000 liters) and replaced the original wooden tank in 1984. The site has two other structures, an old power plant building and a 100,000 US gallon (380,000 L) reservoir. The Lena Electric Plant Building was constructed in 1905 and the reservoir completed in 1907. The Lena Water Tower was listed on the U.S. National Register of Historic Places in 1997; the reservoir was included as a contributing property to the listing.

== History ==
The need for a water tower in Lena was the topic of newspaper editorials many years before the current structure was actually built in 1896. In the early 1870s fires struck a stable, a warehouse, a rural school and several houses in and around Lena. The 1871 Great Chicago Fire induced a sense of panic among many Illinoisians, including those in the village of Lena. In 1874 fire nearly destroyed the freight house and depot owned by the Illinois Central Railroad in Lena. The fires continued through the 1870s and 1880s and the Lena Star editorials led the crusade to build a water tower.

The week of June 14, 1895 workers began drilling for the new reservoir and water tower. The drill reached 400 feet (121.9 m) in depth and became stuck. It was not freed until October 1895 and work crews were forced to work double shifts to compensate. The tower structure itself began rising by early November when disaster struck the project. As a rock was being hoisted up the tower it crashed to the ground ripping through the first two floors of the structure. When a winter thaw hit the area on December 25 the mortar on the building began to crumble; the unseasonable thaw had weakened poorly mixed mortar. Citizens were outraged and blamed the newspaper for pushing the tower so furiously. The paper, in turn, blamed the faulty work of the contractor; the foundation was not large enough to support the mass of the tower structure.

In June 1896 village trustees voted to hire U.S. Wind, Engine and Pump Company from Batavia, Illinois to demolish the unstable water tower and rebuild it with a properly founded structure. On June 19, 1896 the company arrived to demolish the old structure and begin laying a new foundation using Portland cement. The tower had risen 35 feet (10.7 m) by July and by September the brick portion of the facade was completed at 100 feet (30.5 m). By October 1896 the cypress water tank was installed atop the Lena Water Tower.

== Design ==
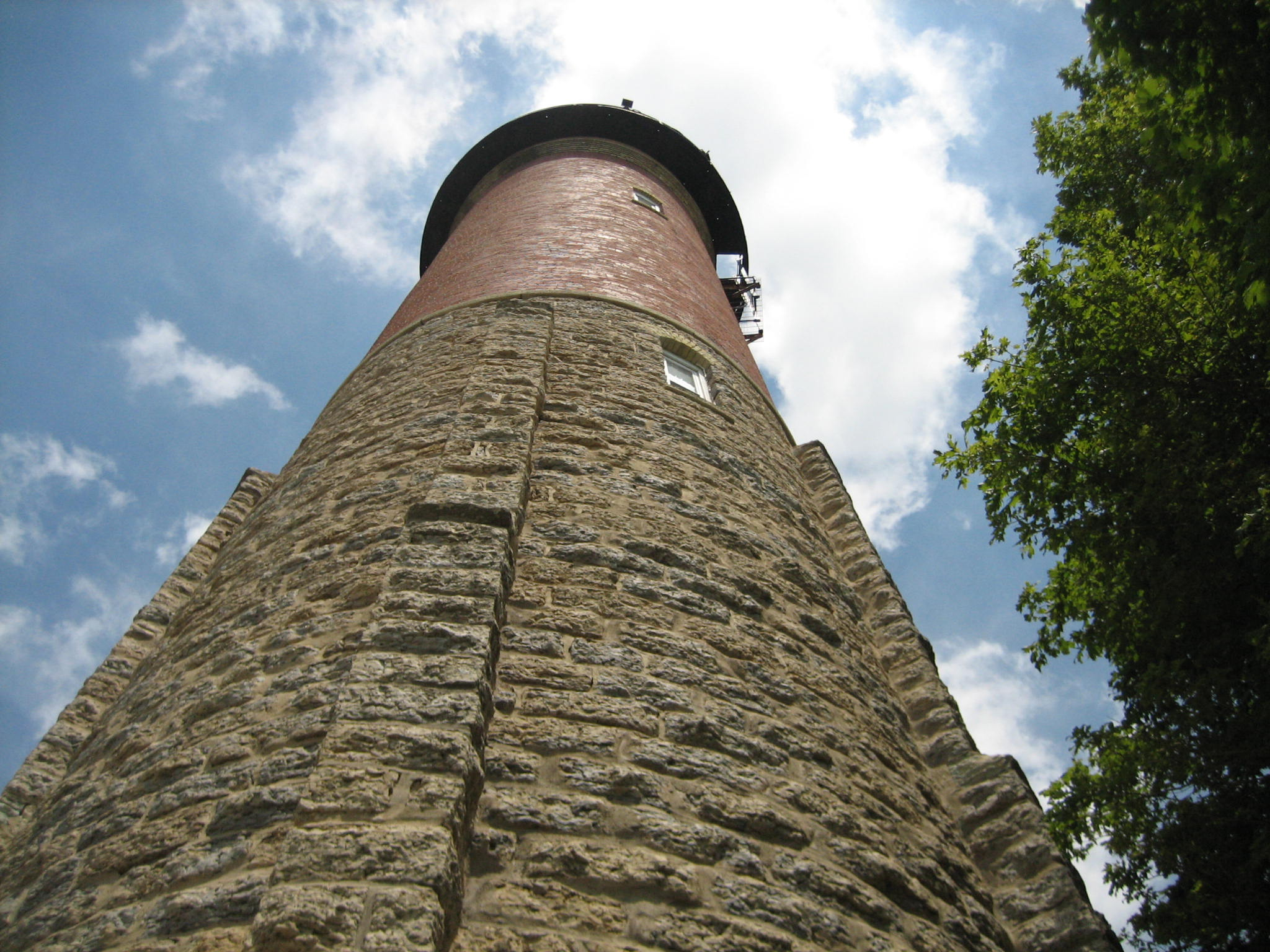
Limestone clads the first 56 feet (17.1 m) while red brick rises another 44 feet (13.4 m). The stone buttresses rise 50 feet (15.2 m).

The Lena Water Tower is situated on a triangular section of land in the village of Lena, Illinois, located in western Stephenson County approximately 38 miles (61 km) east of Galena, Illinois. It is 22 feet (6.7 m) wide at its base and rises to a height of 122.5 feet (37.3 m). The first 56 feet (17.1 m) of the structure was constructed from limestone blocks, each block measures 24 inches (61 cm) by 30 inches (76 cm). Six stone buttresses flank the first 50 feet (15.2 m) of the water tower as well. The 44 feet (13.4 m) beyond the limestone portion of the facade is faced in red brick. The limestone was quarried east of the village.

Atop the brick of the current Lena Water Tower is a stainless steel tank which is held in place only by the weight of the water inside. The current tank replaced the old wooden water tank in 1984 and is painted black with "LENA" spelled out in large yellow letters across its face. The tank is 22.5 feet (6.9 m) tall and 18.6 feet (5.7 m) in diameter; it holds 50,000 gallons (189,271 L) of water and is ringed by a metal catwalk.

== Other structures ==
=== Lena Electric Light Plant Building ===
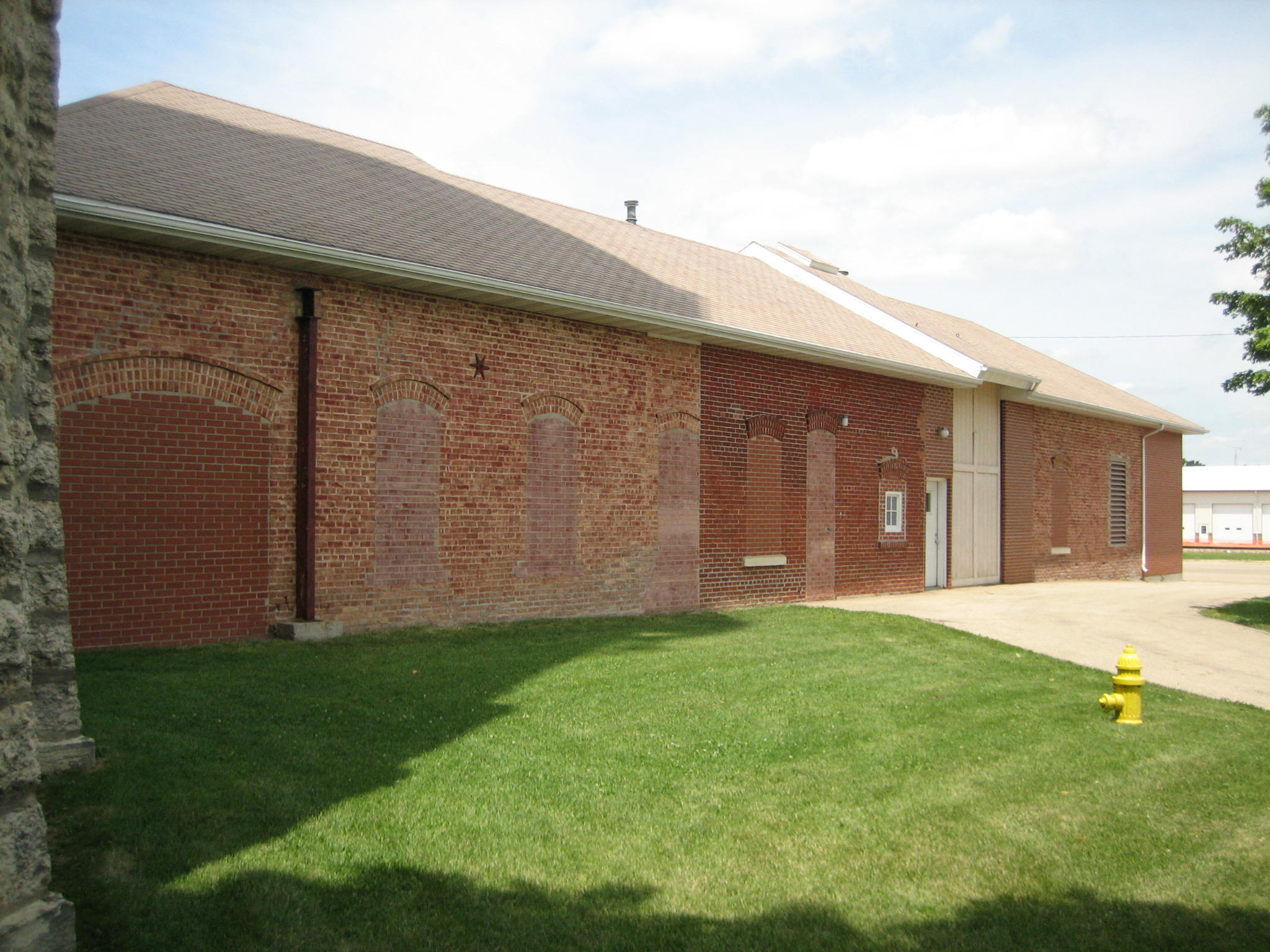
The old Lena Electric Light Plant Building was constructed in 1905.

There is one building on the Lena Water Tower site. The Electric Light Plant Building was constructed in 1905 by the Benfield Brothers for developer W.M. Arnold and it housed the Lena Electric Light Plant. By 1920 the building had two additions; in 1912 a brick addition was added to the building's south elevation to house a steam engine and boiler, the 1920 addition was of brick and on the Electric Plant's north elevation.

The hip roof is clad in asphalt shingles while the wooden soffits have been covered with aluminum, another of the alterations through the years. The original structure featured doors and windows that have since been bricked over and altered. From east to west on the original south elevation was a 7.5 feet (2.29 m) by 10 feet (3.05 m) doorway, four windows, a doorway, another door, and two windows. The north and west facades had two windows and the south elevation another large doorway. In 1978 Pierce Construction of Lena was hired to completely or partially brick over all doors and windows on the building. A new windowed, wooden door was installed in a new opening on the east facade of the Electric Plant.

The building had two more additions in 1982. A red brick addition with an 18 feet (5.49 m) by 15 feet (4.57 m) garage door was added to the north elevation and a shed addition with a 9 feet (2.74 m) by 7 feet (2.13 m) garage door was added to the southeast elevation, both built in 1982.

=== Reservoir ===
The on site reservoir was completed in 1907 and is connected to the old Electric Plant Building through two 15 feet (4.57 m) cast iron pipes. The 100,000 gallon (378,541 L) reservoir is constructed from concrete and features a roof of wood and metal.

== Significance ==
The Lena Water Tower has been in continuous service since it was built in 1896 and is the tallest structure in the village. Its role in providing the citizens of Lena with water services beginning in 1896 is the primary reason the structure was listed on the U.S. National Register of Historic Places on February 20, 1997. Included in the listing to the National Register was the reservoir, which was added as a contributing property. The Electric Plant Building, however, was not included in the listing because of the large number of modern alterations it has undergone. The Lena Water Tower is believed to be one of three in the state of Illinois designed and built of similar construction and has become a symbol of the village of Lena.
