= Joe Lobdell =

American football player (born 1983)

No. 75
- Position: Offensive tackle

Personal information
- Born: May 20, 1983 (age 43); Monroe, Wisconsin, U.S.
- Listed height: 6 ft 5 in (1.96 m)
- Listed weight: 280 lb (127 kg)

Career information
- High school: Lena-Winslow (IL)
- College: Northern Iowa
- NFL draft: 2007: undrafted

Career history
- Indianapolis Colts (2007)*; Kansas City Chiefs (2007–2008)*
- * Offseason or practice squad member only

Awards and highlights
- Second-team All-Gateway (2006)

Joseph Lobdell (born May 20, 1983) is an American former football offensive tackle. He was signed by the Indianapolis Colts as an undrafted free agent in 2007. He played high school football at Lena-Winslow High School in Lena, Illinois and college football at Northern Iowa.

Lobdell was also a member of the Kansas City Chiefs.
