= Orangeville, Illinois =

Orangeville
- Village
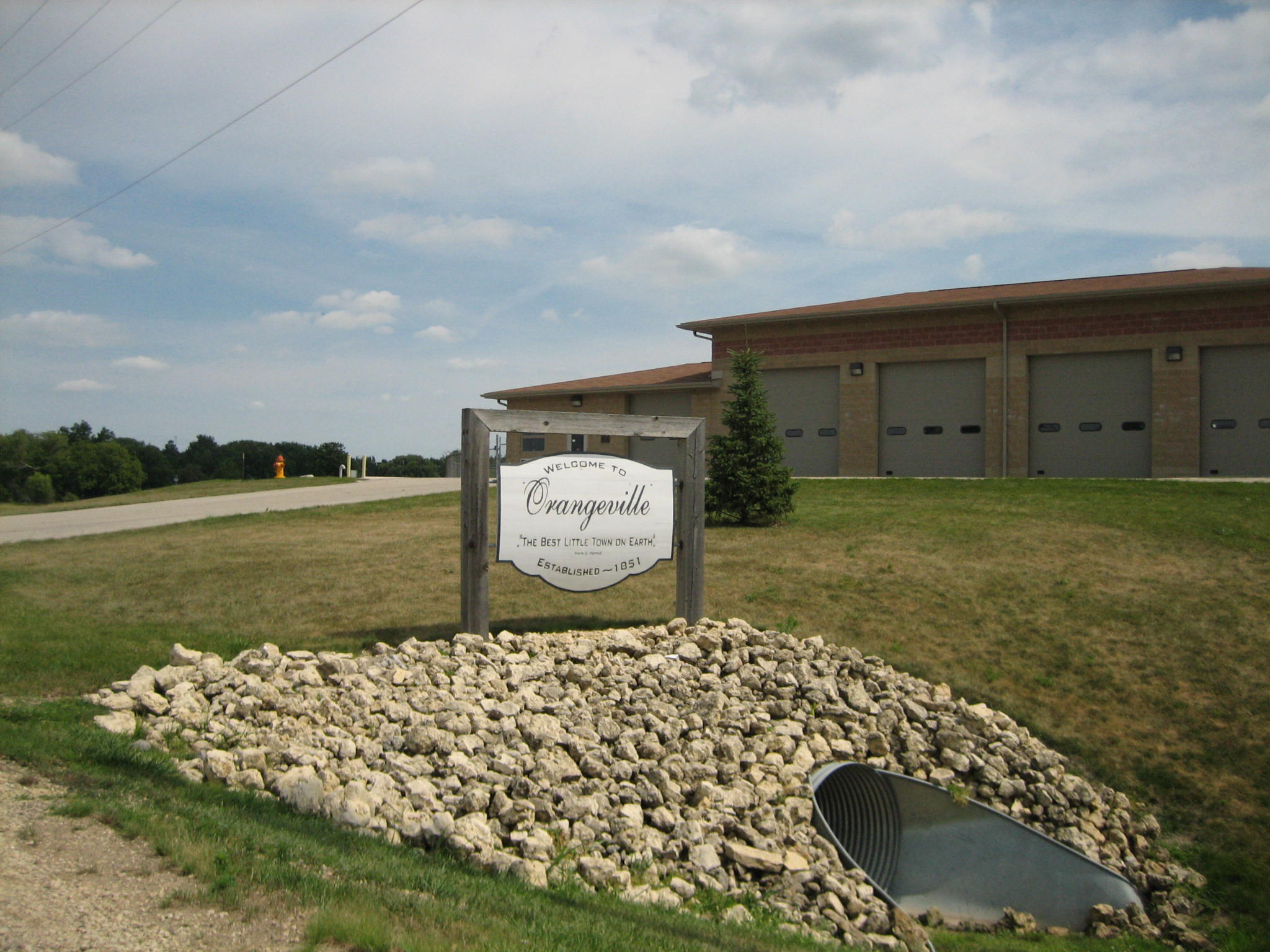
- Sign upon entering the village of Orangeville.
- Motto: The best little town on earth.
- Location of Orangeville in Stephenson County, Illinois.
- Coordinates: 42°27′57″N 89°38′49″W
- Country: United States
- State: Illinois
- County: Stephenson
- Township: Oneco
- Founded: 1851

Area
  - Total: 0.68 sq mi (1.75 km^{2})
  - Land: 0.68 sq mi (1.75 km^{2})
  - Water: 0 sq mi (0.00 km^{2})
- Elevation: 797 ft (243 m)

Population (2020)
  - Total: 766
  - Density: 1,133.4/sq mi (437.61/km^{2})
- Time zone: UTC-6 (CST)
  - Summer (DST): UTC-5 (CDT)
- ZIP code: 61060
- Area code: 815
- FIPS code: 17-56341
- GNIS feature ID: 2399580
- Website: http://villageoforangeville.com/

Orangeville is a village in Stephenson County, Illinois, United States. The town's sign lists the population at 800 as of January 2021. The population in 2020 was 738. The population according to the 2010 census was 793, up from 751 in 2000. Using the 2020 population of 738 Orangeville is the 741st largest city in Illinois and the 11,650th largest city in the United States. Orangeville is currently declining at a rate of -0.94% annually and its population has decreased by -6.94% since the 2010 census. The area's earliest white settlers arrived in the year 1833, and the village was platted in 1851 by John Bower, who is considered the village founder. In 1867 Orangeville was incorporated as a village. The town's central business district contains several 19th-century commercial buildings, many of which were built during the railroad boom of 1888–1914. By the time the Great Depression was ongoing, business in Orangeville had started to decline, with the last bank closing in 1932. In 1956 another bank started operating in the village and is still in town today. Some recent infrastructure jumps have restored some of the village's old decor.

Orangeville is about two miles (3 km) south of the Illinois – Wisconsin border and about 35 miles (56 km) west of Rockford, Illinois. Orangeville is located directly off of Illinois Route 26 between Monroe, Wisconsin and Freeport, Illinois. The town itself is located in farmland surrounded by vale and rises from Richland Creek on its west end, down High Street and into the central business district, where the Central House hotel occupies the highest lot. Public education in Orangeville is the responsibility of Orangeville Community School District #203 which previously operated an elementary school on the south side and a combination junior and senior high school on the east side. In 2019 the district combined the elementary school with the joint high school on the east side to create the Orangeville High School. The previous elementary school was converted to a multi-family complex.

== History ==
=== Early history ===
Before 1837, the area was occupied by Native Americans who utilized it for hunting grounds; the Sioux tribe had a camp near Oneco. Game that populated the Orangeville area included buffalo and deer. John H. Curtis purchased the 80 acres (32 ha) of land, which included the area that would eventually become Orangeville, on January 1, 1838, at the United States General Land Office in Dixon. Curtis constructed a dam on Richland Creek, and on the creek's west bank erected a gristmill and a saw mill. Curtis died in 1843 and both mills stood idle until John Bower arrived in 1846, with his family, after having visited the area the year before. Bower purchased the 80 acres (32 ha) and the mills.

Throughout the 1830s and 1840s farmers from New York and Pennsylvania, known as the Pennsylvania Dutch, arrived to settle the area around present-day Orangeville. Of the first 14 settlers to the area, 13 were Pennsylvania Dutch, the 14th was a German immigrant. A Dr. Thomas Van Valsah led a wagon train from Pennsylvania to Stephenson County in 1837.

The village of Orangeville was founded by John Bower, popularly confused as "Bowers." Bower came to Stephenson County in 1845 and, on October 16, 1846, bought the land that would be platted as Orangeville from for $950. Bower built the Union House in 1849 on a portion of what became Orangeville in 1851. Though the town was platted by Bower in 1851, it was not incorporated until 1867. A drawing of the plat was done by surveyor Marcus Montelius and indicated that Orangeville has always been known as Orangeville; several publications have asserted that the town began as Bowersville or Bowers Mills and underwent a name change in 1854. It is possible that the incorrect name Bowersville was a misremembered version of "Bower's mill". The plat also showed 48 original town lots.

At the outset, Bower brought "wagon loads" of lumber from Galena and Chicago to the settlement, and by 1849 he had reconstructed and improved the gristmill. The mill was completed in 1850 at a cost of $8,000. Charles Moore, who would become the first President of the village when it was incorporated, came to the town, lured by Bower's efforts, in 1849. George Hamilton built a store and soon farmers began to build houses, by 1850 a stagecoach served the area. In September 1852 construction began on Orangeville's first church.

By 1854, Orangeville was in competition with the village of Oneco as a growing center of commerce. That year, the federal government decided that population growth in the two villages warranted the establishment of a post office. On an appointed day, residents of both villages lined up on the sides of the street according to which town they supported as the location for the post office. Orangeville won by a narrow margin.

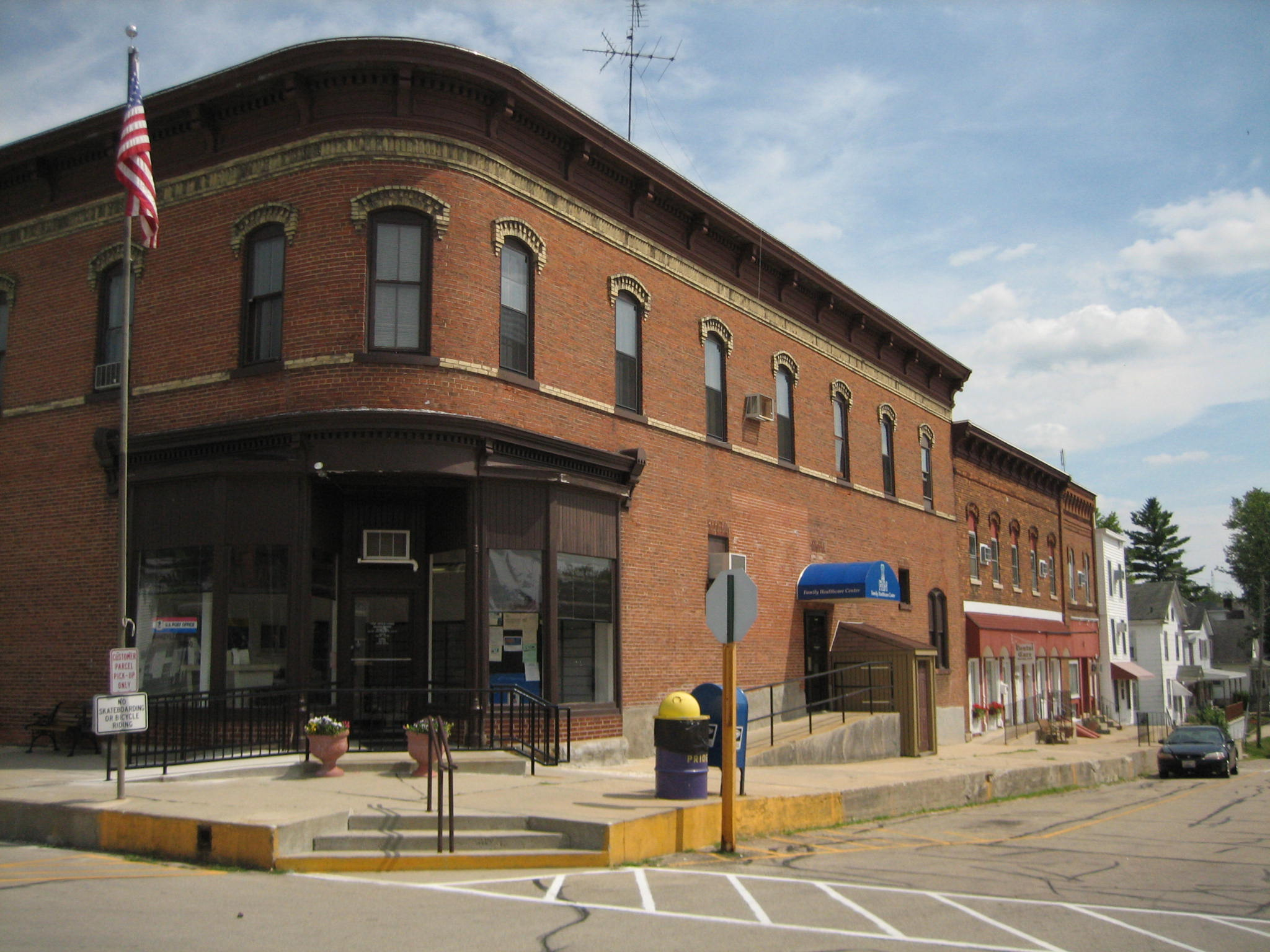
The current Orangeville post office; in 1854 the village narrowly won an election over Oneco for post office location.

=== Arrival of the railroad ===
After its incorporation the village continued to prosper, the downtown district was mostly complete by the 1870s, with all commercial lots purchased and improved. Mel Trotter who established a chain of rescue missions during his lifetime, was born in the village on May 16, 1870, and lived there until he was five years old when his family moved to Polo, Illinois. By 1877, the village population was up to 300 and in 1883 the Orangeville Alert, the first village newspaper, was established. In 1887, the Illinois Central Railroad decided to link Freeport to Madison, Wisconsin. The only incorporated village along that line was Orangeville, the railroad came in 1888 and led to commercial building boom. This building boom directly resulted in 14 new buildings being erected downtown, all brick buildings downtown save the 1906 Wagner Building and the 1899 R.W. Moore Building were a result of the railroad. Between 1888 and 1914, numerous business developed along the corridor of Main and High Streets, those included: restaurants, drug stores, barber shops, banks, watch and clock repair shops, cigar factory, funeral parlor and casket factory, among several others.

=== Great Depression ===
In 1928, just before the onset of the Great Depression, Illinois State Highway 74 (later Illinois Route 26) was rerouted through the eastern part of Orangeville, bypassing the downtown business district. Though the downtown district no longer had a major thoroughfare passing through it, many of the business were able to survive, at least initially. By 1928, the decline in the business community of Orangeville was evident; the bypass, coupled with the depression continued to negatively affect the village. In 1932, the People's State Bank, the last open bank in Orangeville, closed its doors.

== Geography ==
According to the 2010 census, Orangeville has a total area of 0.63 square miles (1.63 km^{2}), all land.

The village of Orangeville is located in northern Stephenson County, about two miles (3 km) south of the Illinois-Wisconsin border directly off of Illinois Route 26. The village is 11 miles (18 km) south of Monroe, Wisconsin, 12 miles (19 km) north of Freeport, 35 miles (56 km) west of Rockford and 60 miles (97 km) east of Dubuque, Iowa.

The village is located in a river valley which is surrounded by farmland. At the western end, and lowest end, of town Richland Creek runs north–south and is paralleled by the old Illinois Central Railroad bed. The railroad bed is now part of the Jane Addams Trail. High Street, which runs through the historic downtown is the primary east–west route through the village and Main Street, which intersects High Street at its highest point, becomes Freeport Road and leads to the city of Freeport.

=== Cityscape ===
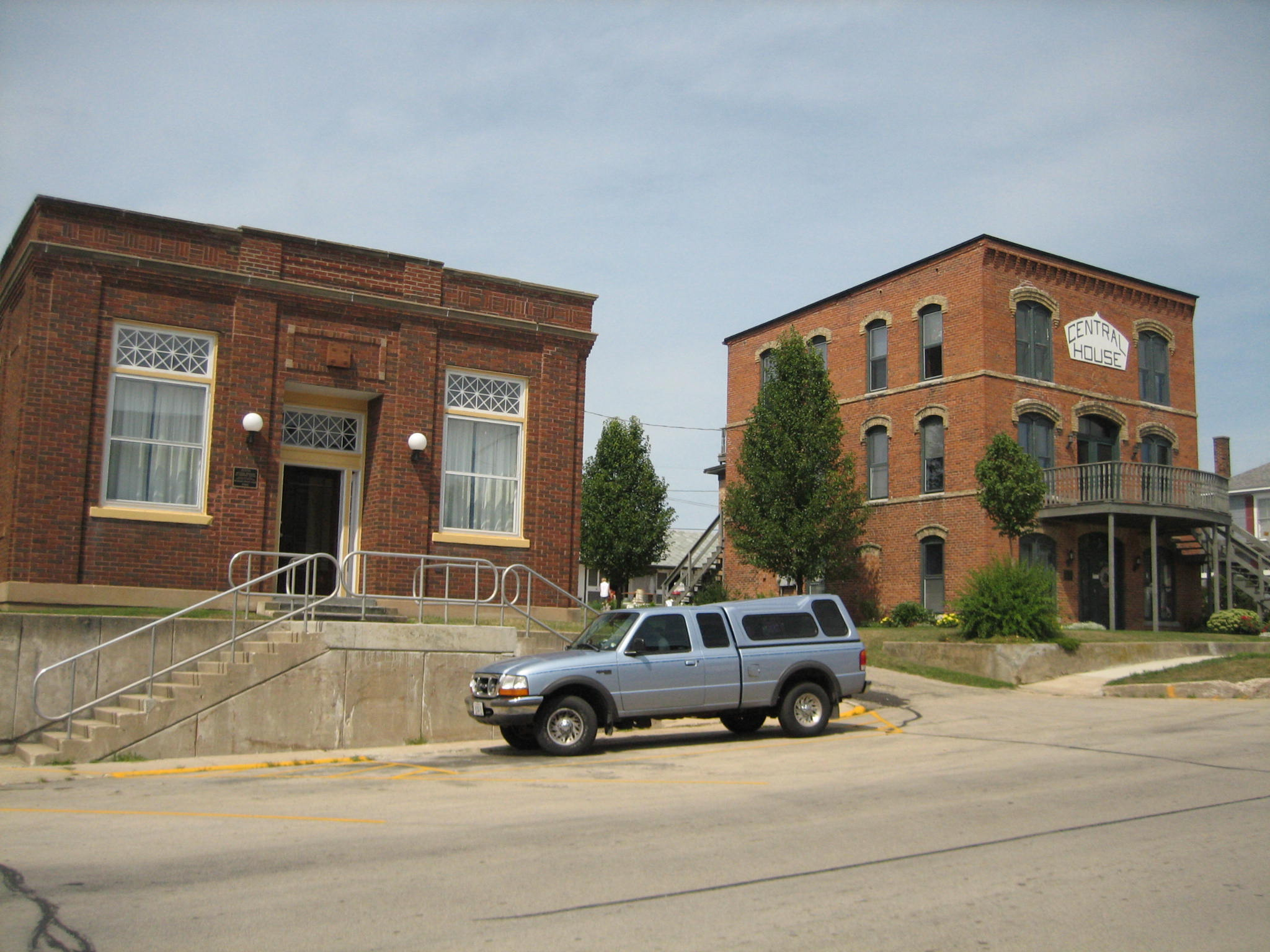
The Central House hotel and the People's State Bank were the first and last commercial buildings built in downtown Orangeville.

The central business district is along High and Main Streets, and forms downtown Orangeville. High Street slopes uphill from the Richland Creek and is populated by historic, 19th-century buildings. At the summit of High Street's slope is the Central House, which is listed on the U.S. National Register of Historic Places. In total, four of the five structures on the National Register in Orangeville, are found along High Street; the Union House and the Orangeville Masonic Hall are the other two. Other historic buildings in the approximately three block area include the 1888 Musser Building, and the 1906 Wagner Building.

The first commercial brick building to be constructed in the main business district was the Central House, which operated as a hotel from its construction during the 1860s until its conversion to a single family residence in the 1930s. All other buildings were erected around Central House, which was specifically located and designed to be the center piece of downtown Orangeville. The People's State Bank was the last major commercial building constructed in historic downtown Orangeville. In 1932 People's State Bank closed its doors. In 1956 Community Bank of Orangeville opened for business in the downtown area. In 1980 Community Bank moved to the current church street location on the south end of town. Community Bank of Orangeville is the village's only operating bank.

in 2020, the old Elementary School located on East St. was converted to a 33,000 sq ft. Multi-Family apartment building. The renovations include 20 studio apartments with utilities as well as common areas.

== Demographics ==
Historical population
Census	Pop.	Note	%±
1870	255		—
1880	326		27.8%
1890	347		6.4%
1900	343		−1.2%
1910	370		7.9%
1920	423		14.3%
1930	383		−9.5%
1940	407		6.3%
1950	460		13.0%
1960	491		6.7%
1970	538		9.6%
1980	598		11.2%
1990	451		−24.6%
2000	751		66.5%
2010	793		5.6%
2020	766		−3.4%
U.S. Decennial Census

Using the 2020 census population of 738 Orangeville is the 741st largest city in Illinois and the 11,650th largest city in the United States. Orangeville is currently declining at a rate of -0.94% annually and its population has decreased by -6.94% since the 2010 census.

As of the census of 2000, there were 751 people, 297 households, and 209 families residing in the village. The population density was 1,168.9 inhabitants per square mile (451.3/km^{2}). There were 316 housing units at an average density of 491.8 per square mile (189.9/km^{2}). The racial makeup of the village was 99.60% White, 0.13% African American, and 0.27% from two or more races. Hispanic or Latino of any race were 0.93% of the population.

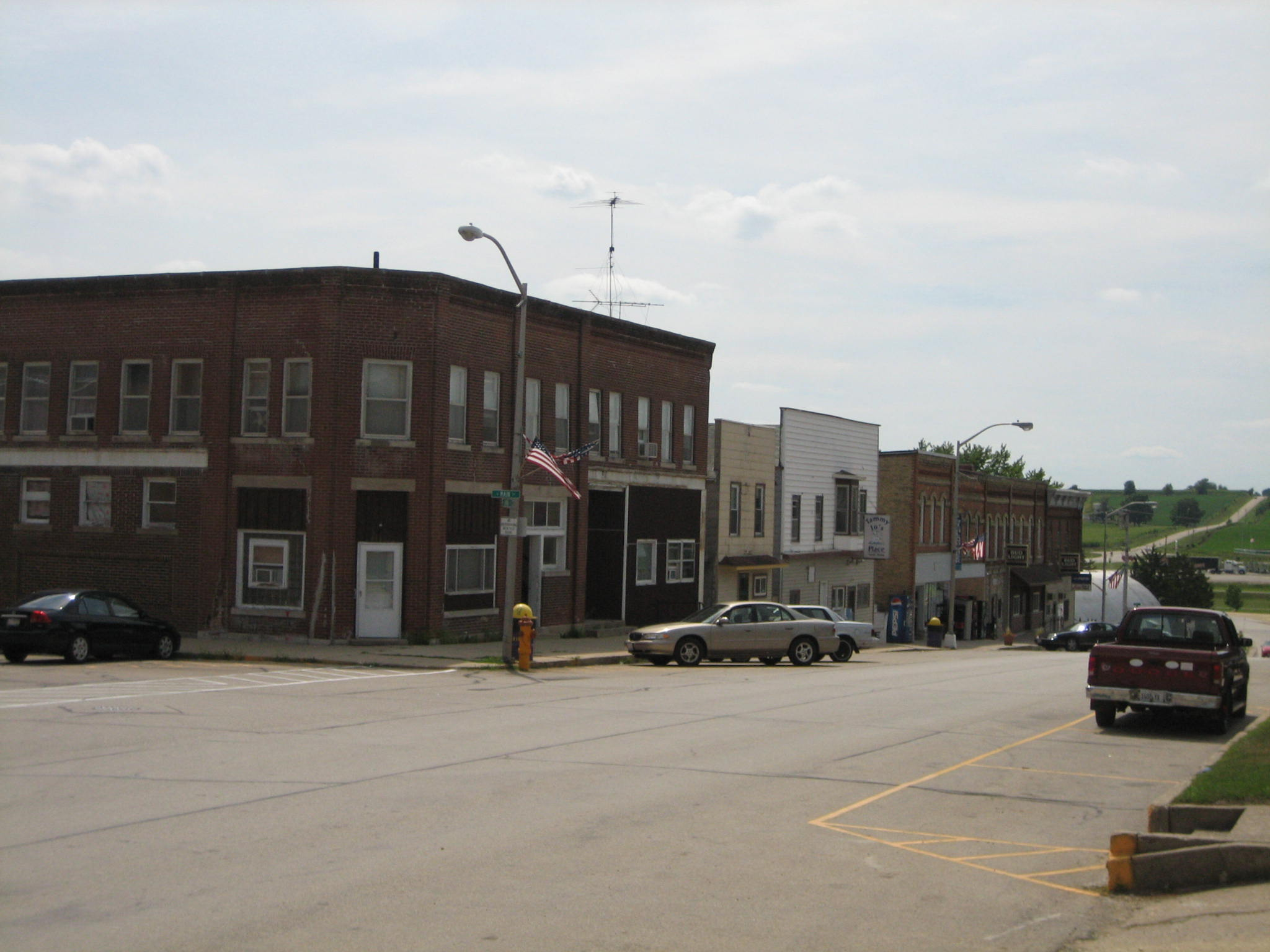
Buildings in downtown Orangeville, Illinois

There were 297 households, out of which 39.7% had children under the age of 18 living with them, 58.6% were married couples living together, 9.8% had a female householder with no husband present, and 29.6% were non-families. 27.6% of all households were made up of individuals, and 11.4% had someone living alone who was 65 years of age or older. The average household size was 2.53 and the average family size was 3.10.

In the village, the population was spread out, with 30.9% under the age of 18, 5.6% from 18 to 24, 31.2% from 25 to 44, 20.9% from 45 to 64, and 11.5% who were 65 years of age or older. The median age was 34 years. For every 100 females, there were 101.3 males. For every 100 females age 18 and over, there were 93.7 males.

The median income for a household in the village was $39,875, and the median income for a family was $45,000. Males had a median income of $30,670 versus $23,646 for females. The per capita income for the village was $17,437. About 1.4% of families and 3.3% of the population were below the poverty line, including 3.8% of those under age 18 and 5.1% of those age 65 or over.

== Culture ==
=== Social and fraternal organizations ===
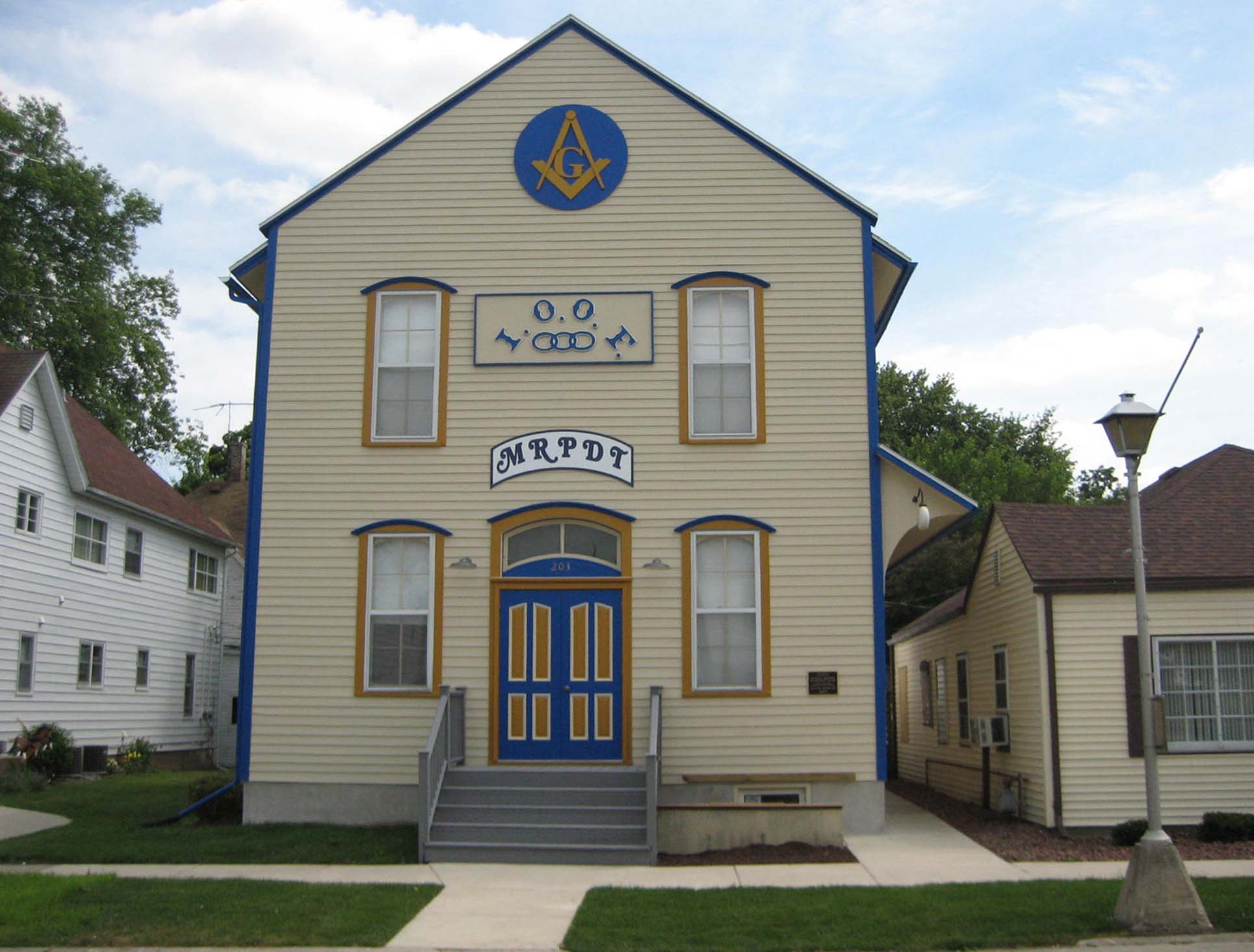
The Orangeville Masonic Lodge was built by the AF and AM in 1876, but is used by all of Orangeville's fraternal organizations.

Social and fraternal organizations have played a major role in the community and the social history of Orangeville. There have been several organizations in Orangeville throughout its history and in 1876 the local Ancient Free and Accepted Masons (AF and AM) Lodge erected the Orangeville Masonic Hall. Though the building was originally constructed to serve as the meeting hall for the local AF and AM Lodge, from its opening it has always been used by all of Orangeville's fraternal organizations.

The Orangeville AF and AM Lodge 687 was chartered October 1, 1872, and its sister organization, Eastern Star, Willow Chapter #434 was founded in 1899. The group held its meetings on the second floor of the Masonic Hall and the first floor was reserved for entertainment and social functions. The Lodge is still active in Orangeville today. The Orangeville Independent Order of Odd Fellows, (IOOF) J.R. Scruggs Lodge 372 was formed on October 18, 1868. The Orangeville IOOF Lodge assisted the March 10, 1896, establishment of their sister organization, the Rebekah Lodge. The IOOF has faced dwindling membership and, in 2002, the Orangeville chapter had less than 50 members.

Orangeville Lodge No. 133 of the International Organization of Good Templars was established in 1867, as a temperance lodge, but it soon dissolved. Other short-lived lodges include the Grand Army of the Republic Lodge, Modern Woodmen of America, and various other temperance lodges. Regardless of their longevity, each of these groups met in the same Orangeville Masonic Hall.

As of late 2014, Orangeville became famous for receiving the Guinness World Record for world's tallest dairy cow. The cow's name is Blosom and is a resident at the Hanson Farm.

In 2026, a local news station from Rockford paid a visit for their Small-Town Spotlight segment.

== Education ==
Public education in Orangeville is provided by Orangeville Community School District #203. The district maintains a single building referred to as the Orangeville Illinois CUSD. This building houses the district's elementary school Orangeville Elementary School as well as the junior and senior high school, Orangeville Jr/Sr High SchoolOrangeville High School. The high school team mascots are the Broncos. The district is administrated by a seven-member Board of Education, which includes three officers, a president, a vice president, and a secretary.

== Notable people ==
- Tessa Janecke, ice hockey player
- Art Young, cartoonist

== See also ==
- Central House
- Charles Fehr Round Barn
- People's State Bank
- Orangeville Masonic Hall
- William Ritzman House
