= Union House =

Historic house in Illinois, United States

- U.S. National Register of Historic Places
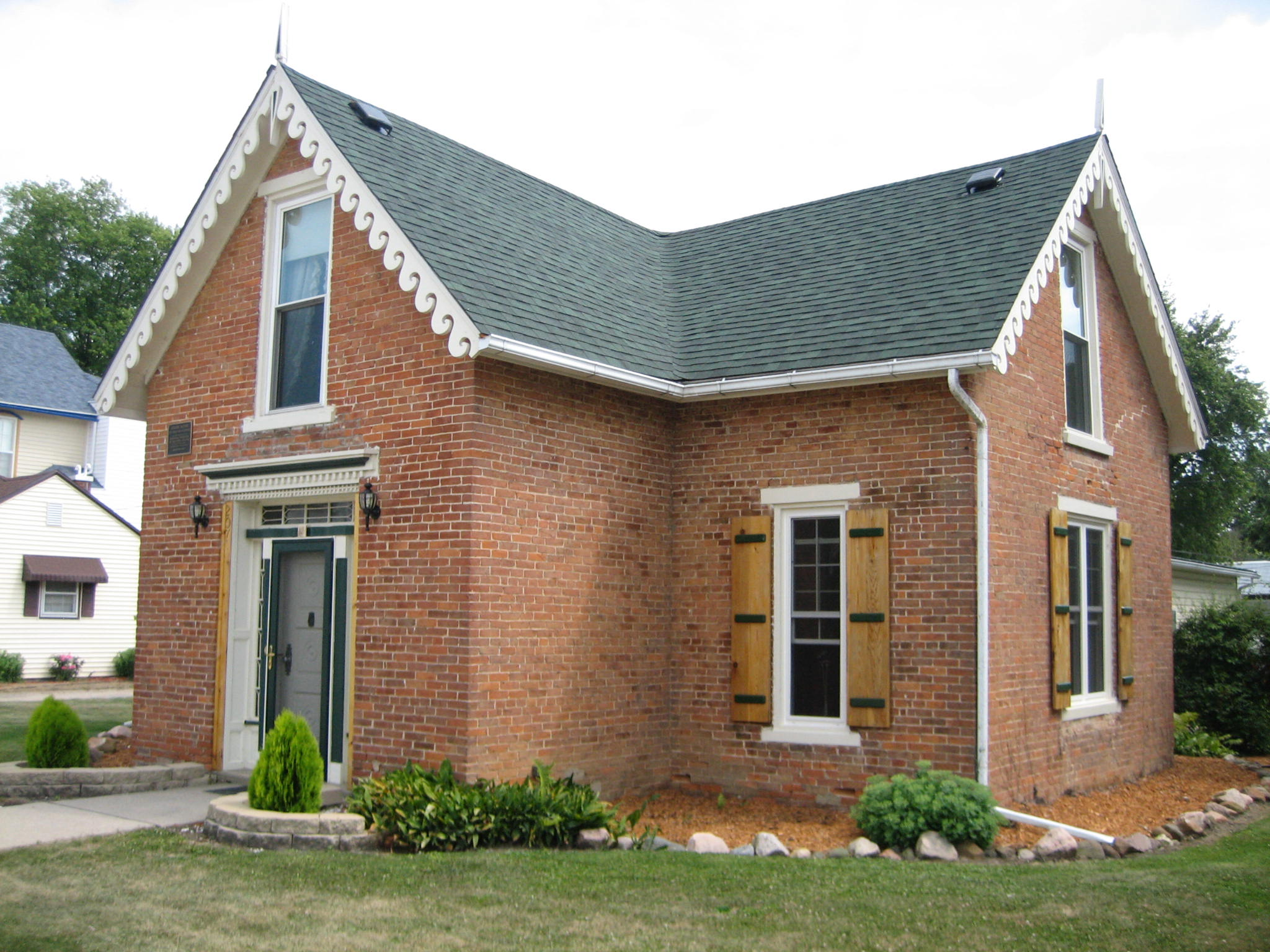

- Location within Illinois Location within the United States
- Interactive map showing the location of Union House
- Location: 207 W. High St., Orangeville, Illinois
- Coordinates: 42°28′7″N 89°38′51″W
- Area: less than one acre
- Built: 1849
- Architect: John Bower (builder)
- Architectural style: Gothic Revival, Greek Revival
- NRHP reference No.: 00000472
- Added to NRHP: May 11, 2000

The Union House, also known as the John Bower House, is a small, mostly Gothic Revival house in downtown Orangeville, Illinois, United States. The house, the first brick home in Orangeville, was built in 1849 by village founder John Bower. It was purchased by Samuel Hutchins in 1885 and it remained in the Hutchins family until 1951. The house blends elements of Greek and Gothic Revival architecture and is the only example of Gothic Revival found in the village of Orangeville. The house was added to the U.S. National Register of Historic Places in 2000.

== History ==
The Union House was the first brick house in Orangeville and erected by village founder John Bower. Bower came to Stephenson County in 1844 and, on October 16, 1846, bought the land that would be platted as Orangeville from John H. Curtis for US$950. Bowers built the Union House in 1849 on a portion of what eventually became Orangeville in 1851. By 1885 Dr. Samuel Hutchins, and his wife Amanda, owned the Union House and used it as a home and a medical office for Hutchins early in his career. William Hutchins inherited the home and lived in it until he died in 1926. His sister Katherine Hutchins took ownership of the building following William's death. When Katherine died in 1944 her mother Linda inherited the house and it was deeded to Robert and Florence Shafer in 1951. The Shafers in turn sold it to Val and Opel Schreiner. The Schreiner's owned the house when it was nominated to the U.S. National Register of Historic Places in 2000.

== Architecture ==
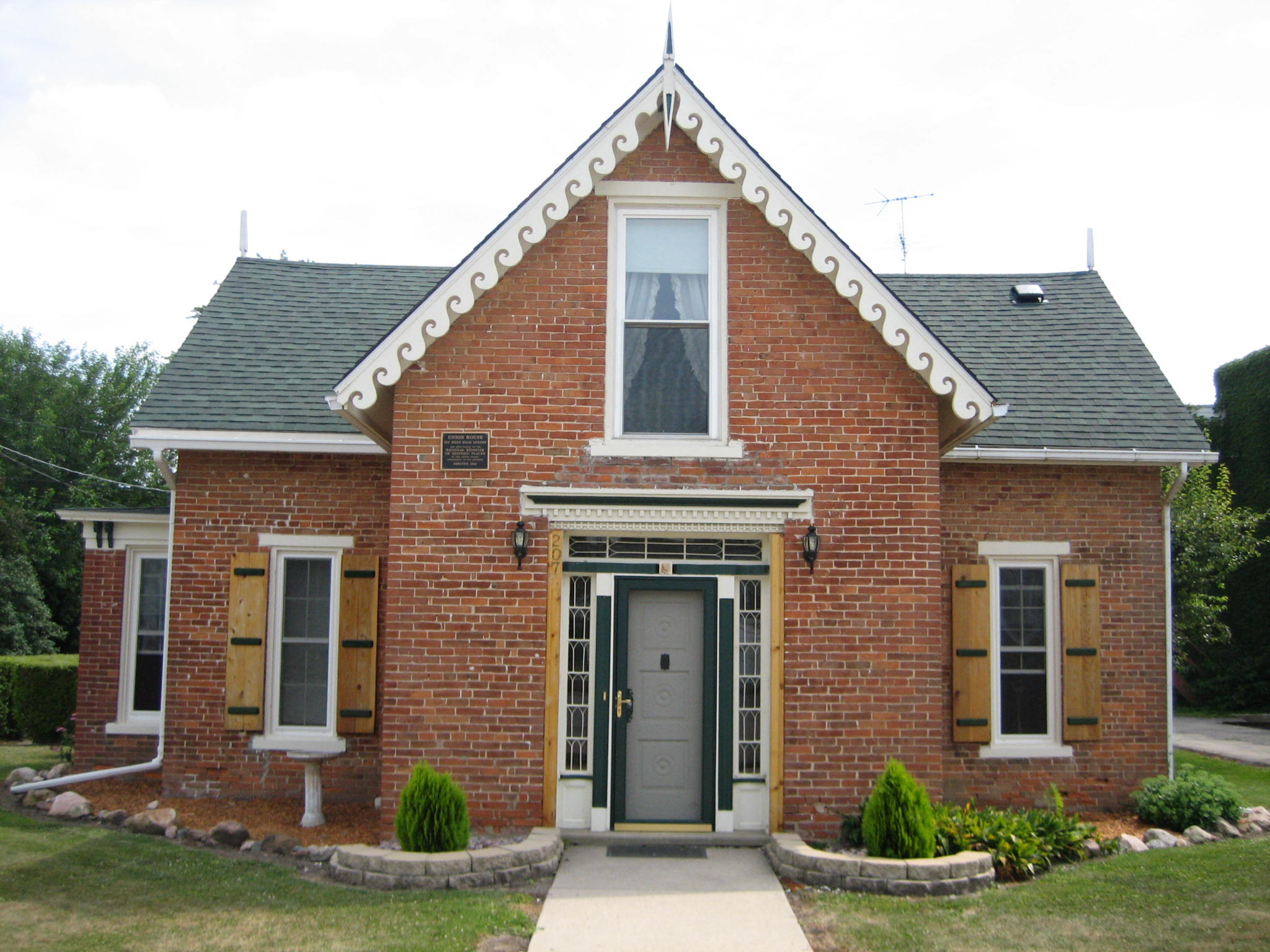
The Union House is an example of the center gabled variety of Gothic Revival.

The Union House utilizes a combination of Greek Revival and Gothic Revival styles. The Greek Revival influence is found in the doorway, which matches almost exactly the description put forth by Virginia and Lee McAlester in their 1984 book, A Field Guide to American Houses. The McAlester description for Greek Revival doorways mentions, elaborate door surrounds flanked by decorative glass sidelights and topped by fanlights, and ornate wood or masonry encasements surrounding the door. The Union House features these characteristics, though does not feature the recessed doorway the McAlesters call "not uncommonly" found in Greek Revival doorways.

Besides the front entrance, the house is cast in the Gothic Revival style, popularized in the United States through various publications from the late 1830s–1850s. The Union House matches descriptions put forth by McAlester as well as in the Galena Historic Preservation Guidebook. McAlester describes decorative bargeboards, steeply pitched gables, and cross gables, with windows usually extending into the gables; all elements which are present on the Union House. The pointed arch windows described by McAlester are not present on the Union House. The Union House is of the centered gable variety described by McAlester. The Galena guidebook also describes steeply pitched roofs, cross gables and decorative bargeboarding. The original decorative bargeboarding on the Union House remains in place.

== Significance ==
The Union House, along with being the first brick house built in Orangeville, is the only example of Gothic Revival architecture found in the village. It is important locally because it was constructed by the village founder, John Bower. The house is also a good example of the crossover from Greek to Gothic Revival and blends elements from both style. The house's local significance, combined with its architectural importance qualified it for listing on the U.S. National Register of Historic Places on May 11, 2000.

== See also ==
- Charles Fehr Round Barn
- People's State Bank
