= Shelbyville Historic District =

Historic district in Illinois, United States

- U.S. National Register of Historic Places
- U.S. Historic district
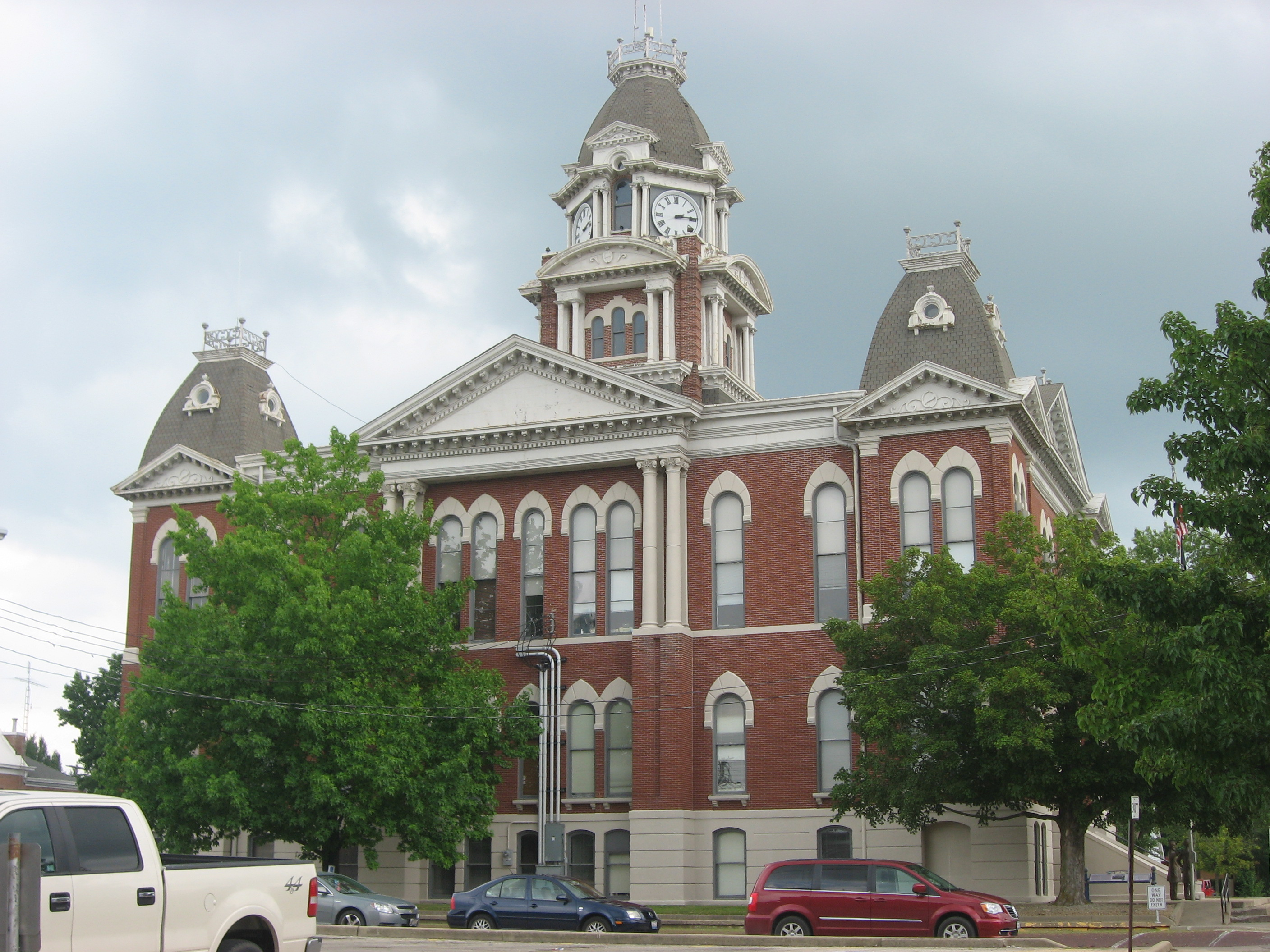
- The Shelby County Courthouse

- Location within Illinois Location within the United States
- Location: Roughly bound by the railroad tracks, Will, N. 8th, and S. 6th Sts., Shelbyville, Illinois
- Coordinates: 39°24′30″N 88°47′41″W
- Area: 158 acres (64 ha)
- Architectural style: Italianate, Greek Revival, Gothic Revival, Second Empire, Queen Anne
- NRHP reference No.: 76000729
- Added to NRHP: December 22, 1976

The Shelbyville Historic District is a historic district encompassing the core of Shelbyville, Illinois. The district includes 398 buildings, 293 of which are contributing buildings. The section of Shelbyville laid out at the city's founding in 1827 forms the center of the district. Shelbyville's public square, which includes the 1880 Shelby County Courthouse and a veterans' memorial, is the central feature of this part of the historic district. The original section of Shelbyville also includes significant commercial and government buildings. The district also includes Shelbyville's oldest residential areas, which developed out from the 1827 core. The Italianate style is the most prominent architectural style in the district, both in homes and commercial buildings; other common architectural styles include Greek Revival, Gothic Revival, Second Empire, and Queen Anne.

The district was added to the National Register of Historic Places on December 22, 1976.
