= Dishwasher =

Machine that washes dishes automatically

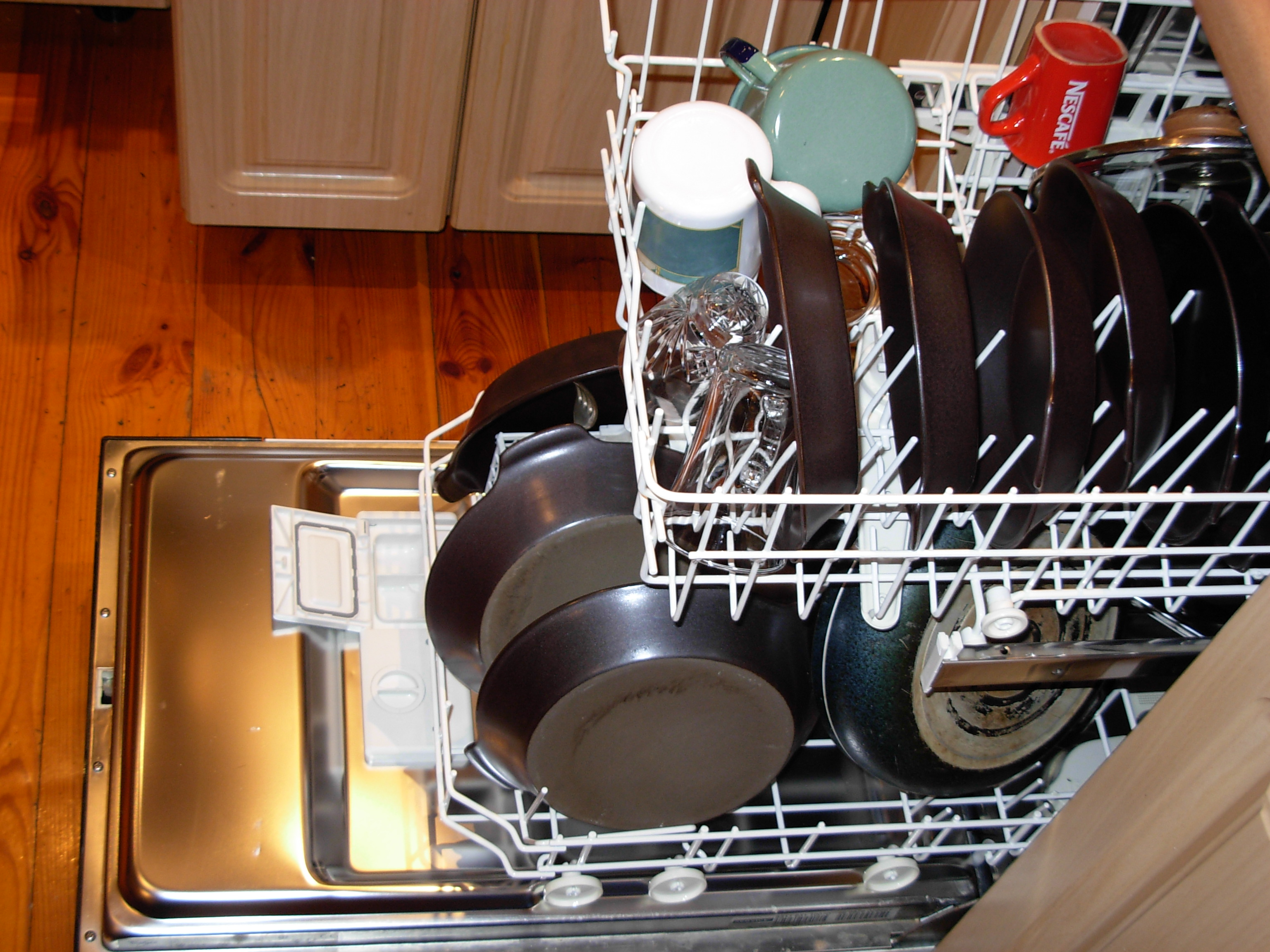
- A dishwasher containing clean dishes
- Type: Appliance
- Inception: 1886; 140 years ago
- Manufacturer: Various
- Available: Globally

A dishwasher is a machine that is used to clean dishware, cookware, and cutlery automatically. Unlike manual dishwashing, which relies on physical scrubbing to remove soiling, the mechanical dishwasher cleans by spraying hot water, typically between 45 and 75 °C (110 and 170 °F), at the dishes, with lower temperatures of water used for delicate items.

A mix of water and dishwasher detergent is pumped to one or more rotating sprayers, cleaning the dishes with the cleaning mixture. The mixture is recirculated to save water and energy. Often there is a pre-rinse, which may or may not include detergent, and the water is then drained. This is followed by the main wash with fresh water and detergent. Once the wash is finished, the water is drained; more hot water enters the tub by means of an electromechanical solenoid valve, and the rinse cycle(s) begin. After the rinse process finishes, the water is drained again and the dishes are dried using one of several drying methods. Typically a rinse-aid, a chemical to reduce the surface tension of the water, is used to reduce water spots from hard water or other reasons.

In addition to domestic units, industrial dishwashers are available for use in commercial establishments such as hotels and restaurants, where many dishes must be cleaned. Washing is conducted with temperatures of 65–71 °C (149–160 °F) and sanitation is achieved by either the use of a booster heater that will provide an 82 °C (180 °F) "final rinse" temperature or through the use of a chemical sanitizer.

== History ==
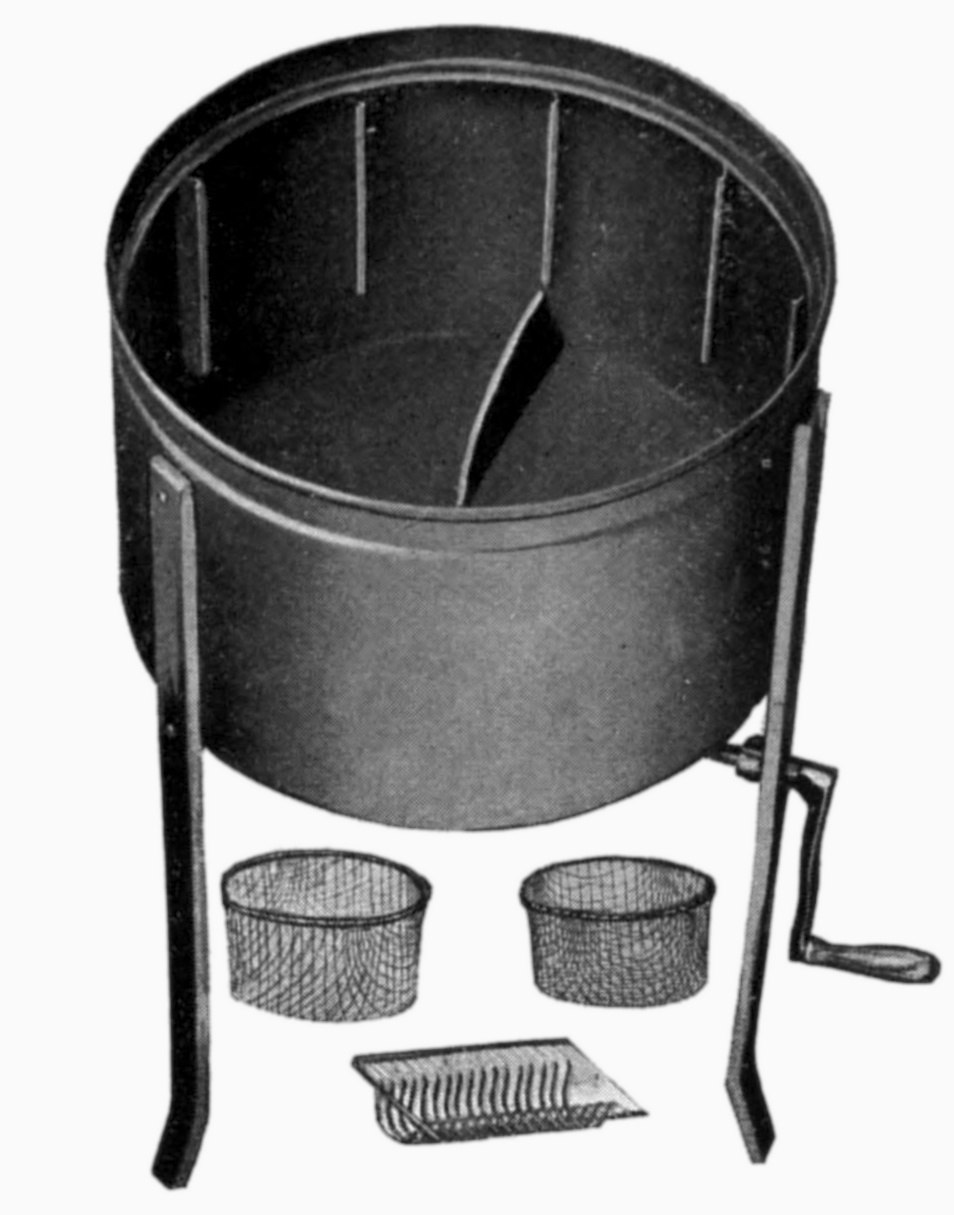
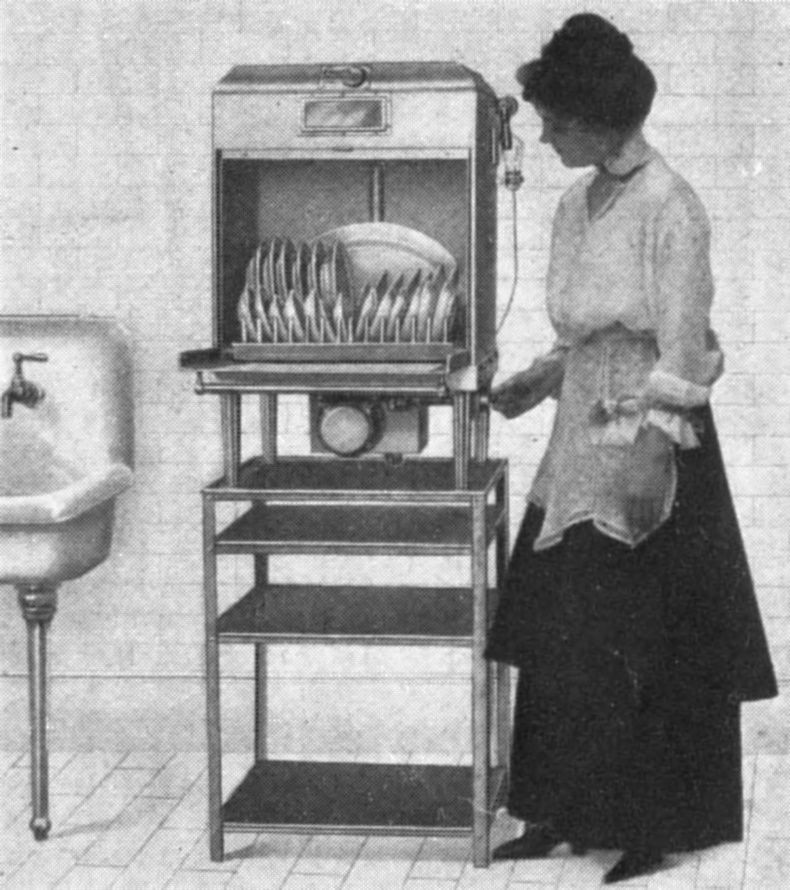
A hand-powered dishwasher and an early electric dishwasher both from about 1917

The first mechanical dishwashing device was registered for a patent in 1850 in the United States by Joel Houghton. This device was made of wood and was cranked by hand while water sprayed onto the dishes. The device was both slow and unreliable. Another patent was granted to L.A. Alexander in 1865 that was similar to the first but featured a hand-cranked rack system. Neither device was practical or widely accepted. Some historians cite as an obstacle to adoption the historical attitude that valued women for the effort put into housework rather than the results—making household chores easier was perceived by some to reduce their value.

The most successful of the hand-powered dishwashers was invented in 1886 by Josephine Cochrane together with mechanic George Butters in Cochrane's tool shed in Shelbyville, Illinois when Cochrane (a wealthy socialite) wanted to protect her china while it was being washed. Their invention was unveiled at the 1893 World's Fair in Chicago under the name of Lavadora but was changed to Lavaplatos as another machine invented in 1858 already held that name. Cochrane's inspiration was her frustration at the damage to her good china that occurred when her servants handled it during cleaning.

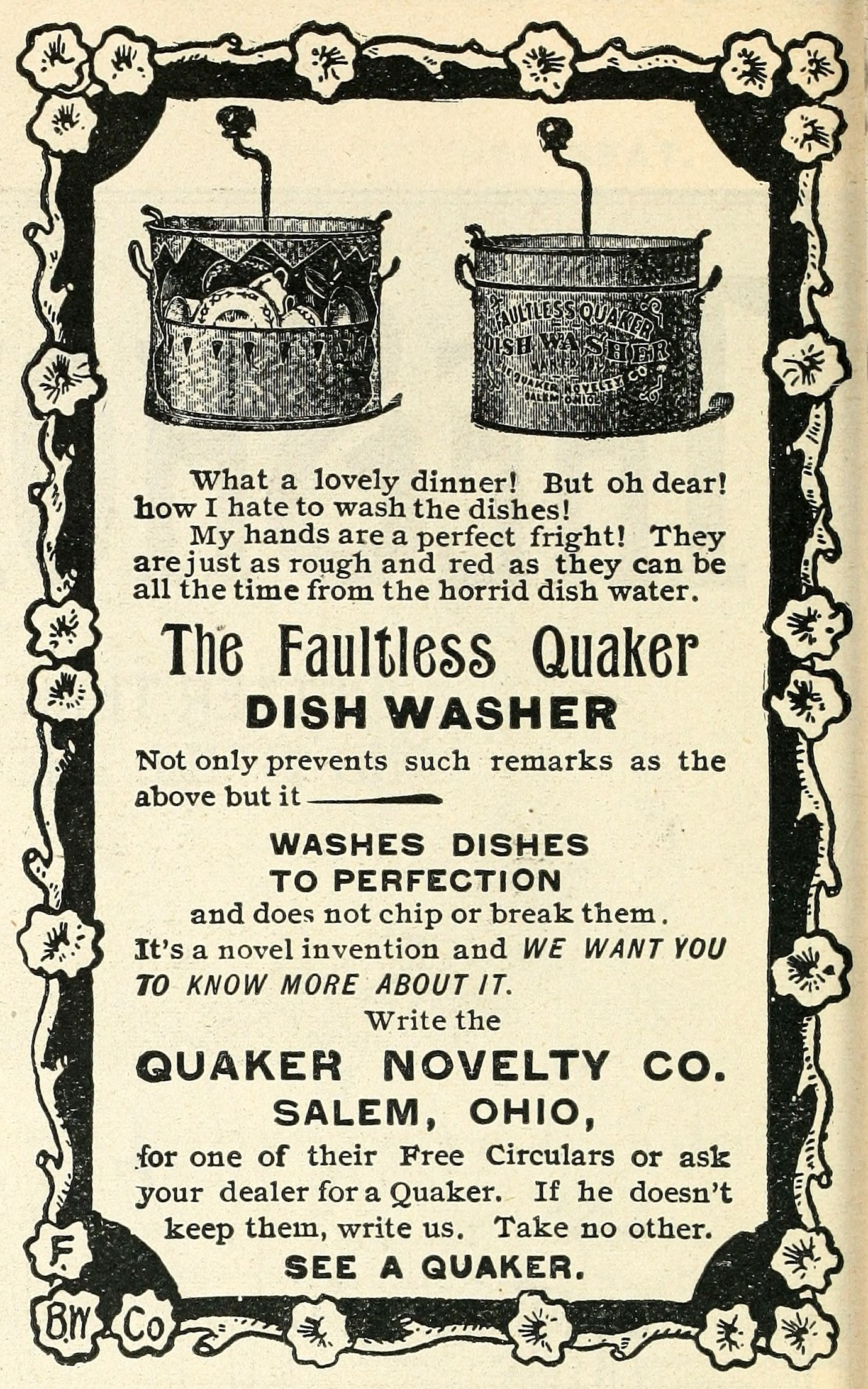
Advertisement in an 1896 issue of McClure's for The Faultless Quaker Dishwasher

Europe's first domestic dishwasher with an electric motor was invented and manufactured by Miele in 1929.

In the United Kingdom, William Howard Livens invented a small, non-electric dishwasher suitable for domestic use in 1924. It was the first dishwasher that incorporated most of the design elements that are featured in the models of today; it included a door for loading, a wire rack to hold the dirty crockery and a rotating sprayer. Drying elements were added to his design in 1940. It was the first machine suitable for domestic use, and it came at a time when permanent plumbing and running water in the home were becoming increasingly common.

Despite this, Liven's design did not become a commercial success, and dishwashers were only successfully sold as domestic utilities in the postwar boom of the 1950s, albeit only to the wealthy. Initially, dishwashers were sold as standalone or portable devices, but with the development of the wall-to-wall countertop and standardized height cabinets, dishwashers began to be marketed with standardized sizes and shapes, integrated underneath the kitchen countertop as a modular unit with other kitchen appliances.

By the 1970s, dishwashers had become commonplace in domestic residences in North America and Western Europe. By 2012, over 75 percent of homes in the United States and Germany had dishwashers.

In the late 1990s, manufacturers began offering various new energy conservation features in dishwashers. One feature was use of "soil sensors", which was a computerized tool in the dishwasher which measured food particles coming from dishes. When the dishwasher had cleaned the dishes to the point of not releasing more food particles, the soil sensor would report the dishes as being clean. The sensor operated with another innovation of using variable washing time. If dishes were especially dirty, then the dishwasher would run for a longer time than if the sensor detected them to be clean. In this way, the dishwasher would save energy and water by only being in operation for as long as needed.

It is noteworthy that prices for dishwashers increased significantly around 2022-2025, in part influenced by United States government-imposed tariffs on importers.

== Design ==
=== Wash chamber construction ===
Dishwashers might use either plastic or stainless steel for the construction of the wash chamber; stainless steel generally provides advantages over plastic construction. Also, though wash chambers can come in different dimensions, it appears the "24-inch" has become standard, at least in the United States.

=== Size and capacity ===
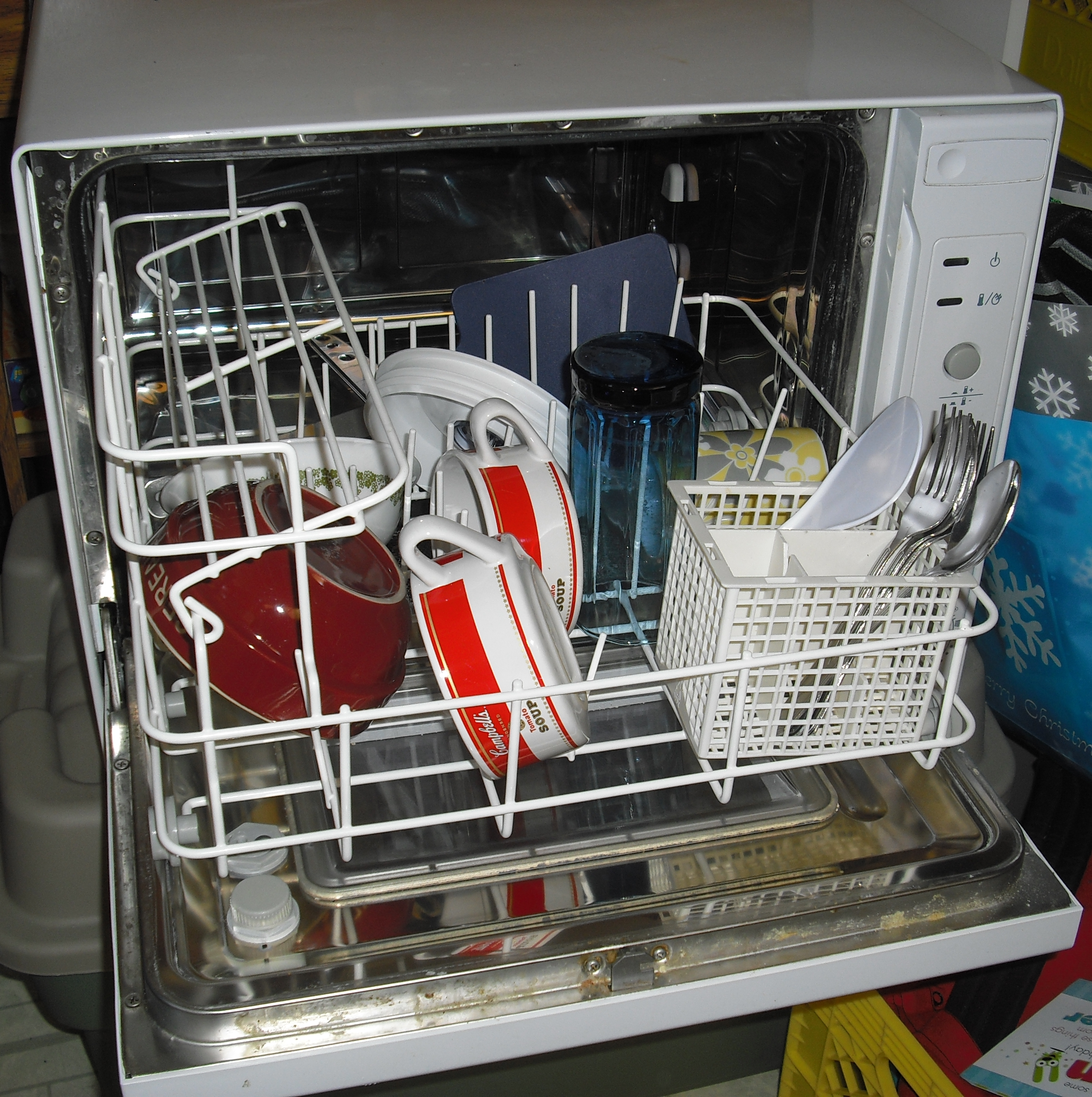
North American counter-top dishwasher

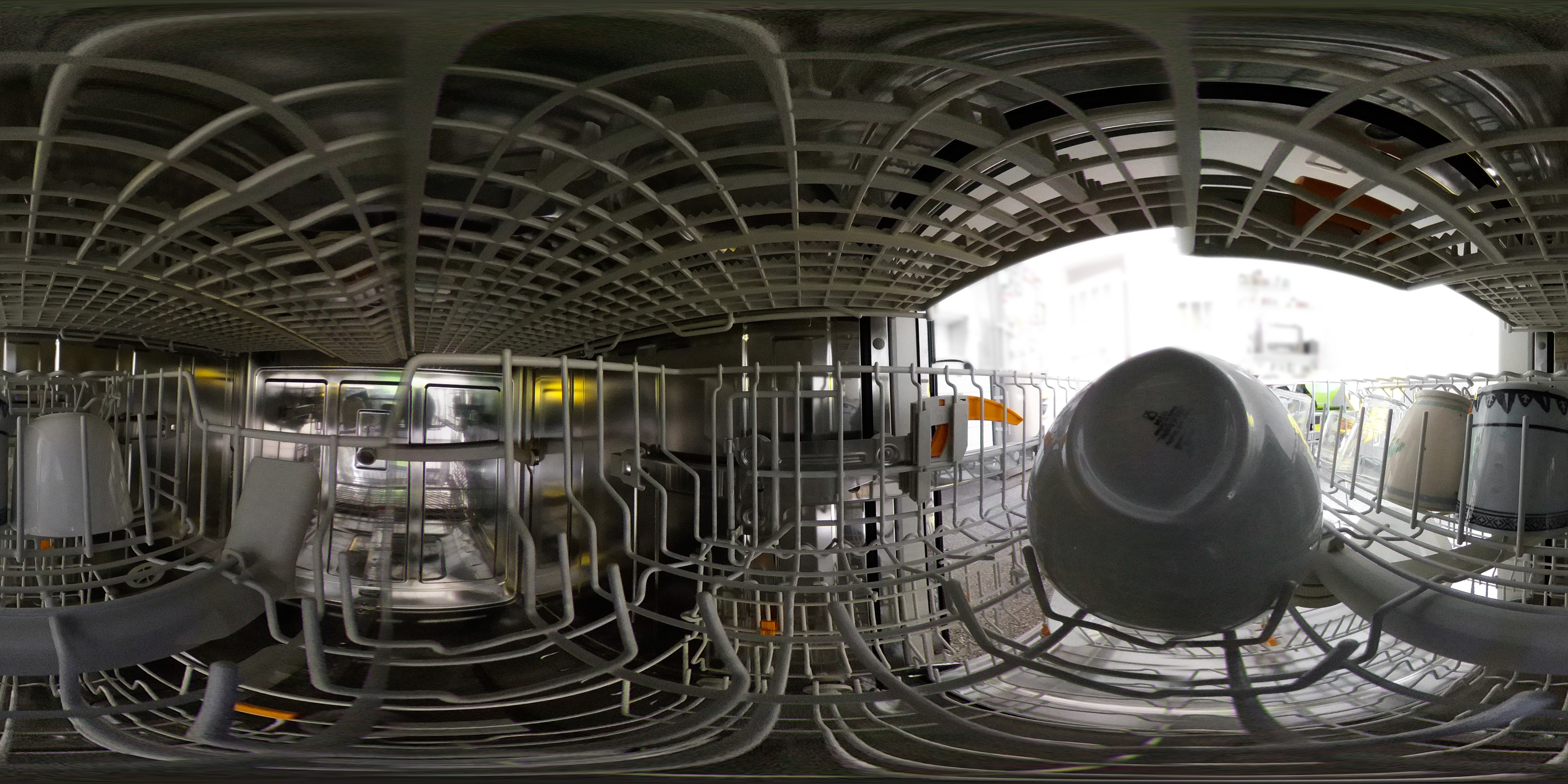
Inside a dishwasher – 360° Photo (view as a 360° interactive panorama)

Dishwashers that are installed into standard kitchen cabinets have a standard width and depth of 60 cm (Europe) or 24 in (61 cm) (US), and most dishwashers must be installed into a hole a minimum of 86 cm (Europe) or 34 in (86 cm) (US) tall. Portable dishwashers exist in 45 and 60 cm (Europe) or 18 and 24 in (46 and 61 cm) (US) widths, with casters and attached countertops. There are also dishwashers available in sizes according to the European gastronorm standard. Dishwashers may come in standard or tall tub designs; standard tub dishwashers have a service kickplate beneath the dishwasher door that allows for simpler maintenance and installation, but tall tub dishwashers have approximately 20% more capacity and better sound dampening from having a continuous front door.

The international standard for the capacity of a dishwasher is expressed as standard place settings. Commercial dishwashers are rated as plates per hour. The rating is based on standard-sized plates of the same size. The same can be said for commercial glass washers, as they are based on standard glasses, normally pint glasses.

=== Layout ===
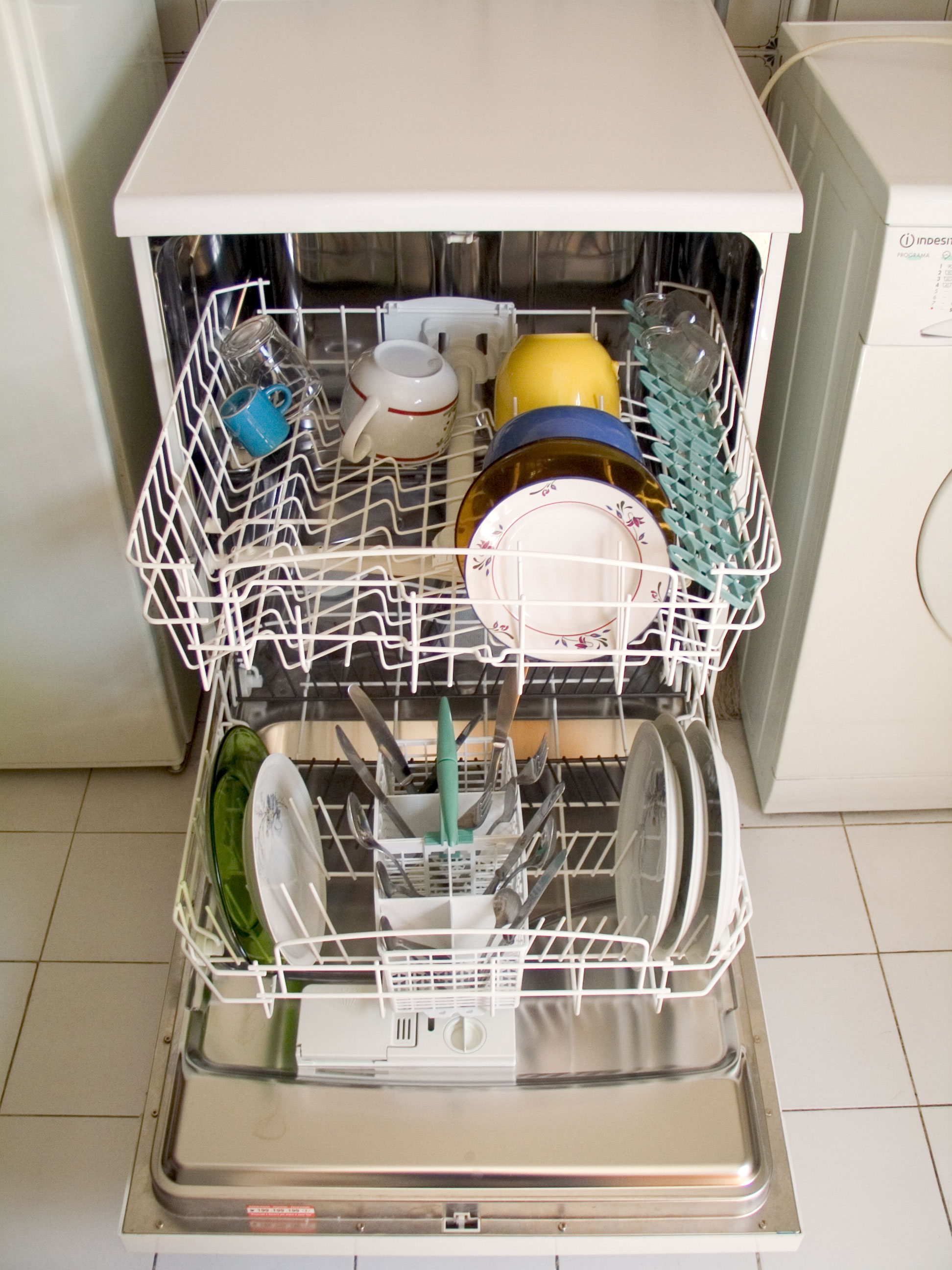
An open dishwasher

Present-day machines feature a drop-down front panel door, allowing access to the interior, which usually contains two or sometimes three pull-out racks; racks can also be referred to as "baskets". In older U.S. models from the 1950s, the entire tub rolled out when the machine latch was opened, and loading as well as removing washable items was from the top, with the user reaching deep into the compartment for some items. Youngstown Kitchens, which manufactured entire kitchen cabinets and sinks, offered a tub-style dishwasher, which was coupled to a conventional kitchen sink as one unit. Most present-day machines allow for placement of dishes, silverware, tall items and cooking utensils in the lower rack, while glassware, cups and saucers are placed in the upper rack. One notable exception were dishwashers produced by the Maytag Corporation from the late sixties until the early nineties. These machines were designed for loading glassware, cups and saucers in the lower rack, while plates, silverware, and tall items were placed into the upper rack. This unique design allowed for a larger capacity and more flexibility in loading of dishes and pots and pans. Today, "dish drawer" models eliminate the inconvenience of the long reach that was necessary with older full-depth models. "Cutlery baskets" are also common. A drawer dishwasher, first introduced by Fisher & Paykel in 1997, is a variant of the dishwasher in which the baskets slide out with the door in the same manner as a drawer filing cabinet, with each drawer in a double-drawer model being able to operate independently of the other.

The inside of a dishwasher in the North American market is either stainless steel or plastic. Most of them are stainless steel body and plastic made racks. Stainless steel tubs resist hard water, and preserve heat to dry dishes more quickly. They also come at a premium price. Dishwashers can be bought for as expensive as $1,500+, but countertop dishwashers are also available for under $300. Older models used baked enamel tubs, while some used a vinyl coating bonded to a steel tub, which provided protection of the tub from acidic foods and provided some sound attenuation. European-made dishwashers feature a stainless steel interior as standard, even on low-end models. The same is true for a built-in water softener.

=== Washing elements ===
European dishwashers almost universally use two or three sprayers which are fed from the bottom and back wall of the dishwasher, leaving both racks unimpeded. Such models also tend to use inline water heaters, removing the need for exposed elements in the base of the machine that can melt plastic items near to them. Many North American dishwashers tend to use exposed elements in the base of the dishwasher. Some North American machines, primarily those designed by General Electric, use a wash tube, often called a wash-tower, to direct water from the bottom of the dishwasher to the top dish rack. Some dishwashers, including many models from Whirlpool and KitchenAid, use a tube attached to the top rack that connects to a water source at the back of the dishwasher and directs water to a second wash spray beneath the upper rack, which allows full use of the bottom rack. Late-model Frigidaire dishwashers shoot a jet of water from the top of the washer down into the upper wash sprayer, again allowing full use of the bottom rack (but requiring that a small funnel on the top rack be kept clear).

=== Features ===
Clear model of a running dishwasher

Mid-range to higher-end North American dishwashers often come with hard food disposal units, which behave like miniature garbage (waste) disposal units that eliminate large pieces of food waste from the wash water. One manufacturer that is known for omitting hard food disposals is Bosch, a German brand; however, Bosch does so in order to reduce noise. If the larger items of food waste are removed before placing in the dishwasher, pre-rinsing is not necessary even without integrated waste disposal units.

Many new dishwashers feature microprocessor-controlled, sensor-assisted wash cycles that adjust the wash duration to the number of dirty dishes (sensed by changes in water temperature) or the amount of dirt in the rinse water (sensed chemically or optically). A 'normal' cycle for models sold in the United States is typically 3 to 4 hours, though some models support selection of short cycles on the order of 30 minutes. Sensor-assisted cycle management can save water and energy if the user runs a partial load. In such dishwashers the electromechanical rotary switch often used to control the washing cycle is replaced by a microprocessor, but most sensors and valves are still required. However, pressure switches (some dishwashers use a pressure switch and flow meter) are not required in most microprocessor controlled dishwashers as they use the motor and sometimes a rotational position sensor to sense the resistance of water; when it senses there is no cavitation it knows it has the optimal amount of water. A bimetal switch or wax motor opens the detergent door during the wash cycle.

Some dishwashers include a child-lockout feature to prevent accidental starting or stopping of the wash cycle by children. A child lock can sometimes be included to prevent young children from opening the door during a wash cycle. This prevents accidents with hot water and strong detergents used during the wash cycle. Some dishwashers also offer WiFi connectivity, supporting remote monitoring of washing progress or start a cycle remotely.

== Process ==
=== Energy use and water temperatures ===
In the European Union, the energy consumption of a dishwasher for a standard usage is shown on a European Union energy label. In the United States, the energy consumption of a dishwasher is defined using the energy factor.

The current energy usage criteria for dishwashers, to achieve Energy Star certification, are ≤ 270 kWh/year for standard dishwashers, and ≤ 203 kWh/year for compact dishwashers.

Most consumer dishwashers use a 75 °C (167 °F) thermostat in the sanitizing process. During the final rinse cycle, the heating element and wash pump are turned on, and the cycle timer (electronic or electromechanical) is stopped until the thermostat is tripped. At this point, the cycle timer resumes and will generally trigger a drain cycle within a few timer increments.

Most consumer dishwashers use 75 °C (167 °F) rather than 83 °C (181 °F) for reasons of burn risk, energy and water consumption, total cycle time, and possible damage to plastic items placed inside the dishwasher. With new advances in detergents, lower water temperatures (50–55 °C; 122–131 °F) are needed to prevent premature decay of the enzymes used to eat the grease and other build-ups on the dishes.

In the US, residential dishwashers can be certified to a NSF International testing protocol which confirms the cleaning and sanitation performance of the unit.

Superheated steam dishwashers can kill 99% of bacteria on a plate in just 25 seconds.

=== Drying ===
The heat inside the dishwasher dries the contents after the final hot rinse. North American dishwashers tend to use heat-assisted drying via an exposed element which tends to be less efficient than other methods. European machines and some high-end North American machines use passive methods for drying – a stainless steel interior helps this process and some models use heat exchange technology between the inner and outer skin of the machine to cool the walls of the interior and speed up drying. Some dishwashers employ desiccants such as zeolite which at the beginning of the wash are heated, dry out and creating steam which warms plates, and then are cooled during the dry cycle which absorbs moisture again, saving significant energy.

Plastic and non-stick items form drops with smaller surface area and may not dry properly compared to china and glass. Some dishwashers incorporate a fan to improve drying. Older dishwashers with a visible heating element (at the bottom of the wash cabinet, below the bottom basket) may use the heating element to improve drying; however, this uses more energy.

Most importantly however, the final rinse adds a small amount of rinse-aid to the hot water, this is a mild detergent that improves drying significantly by reducing the inherent surface tension of the water so that water mostly drips off, greatly improving how well all items, including plastic items, dry.

Most dishwashers feature a drying sensor and as such, a dish-washing cycle is always considered complete when a drying indicator, usually in the form of an illuminated "end" light, or in more modern models on a digital display or audible sound, exhibits to the operator that the washing and drying cycle is now over.

US governmental agencies often recommend air-drying dishes by either disabling or stopping the drying cycle to save energy.

== Differences between dishwashers and hand washing ==
=== Dishwasher detergent ===
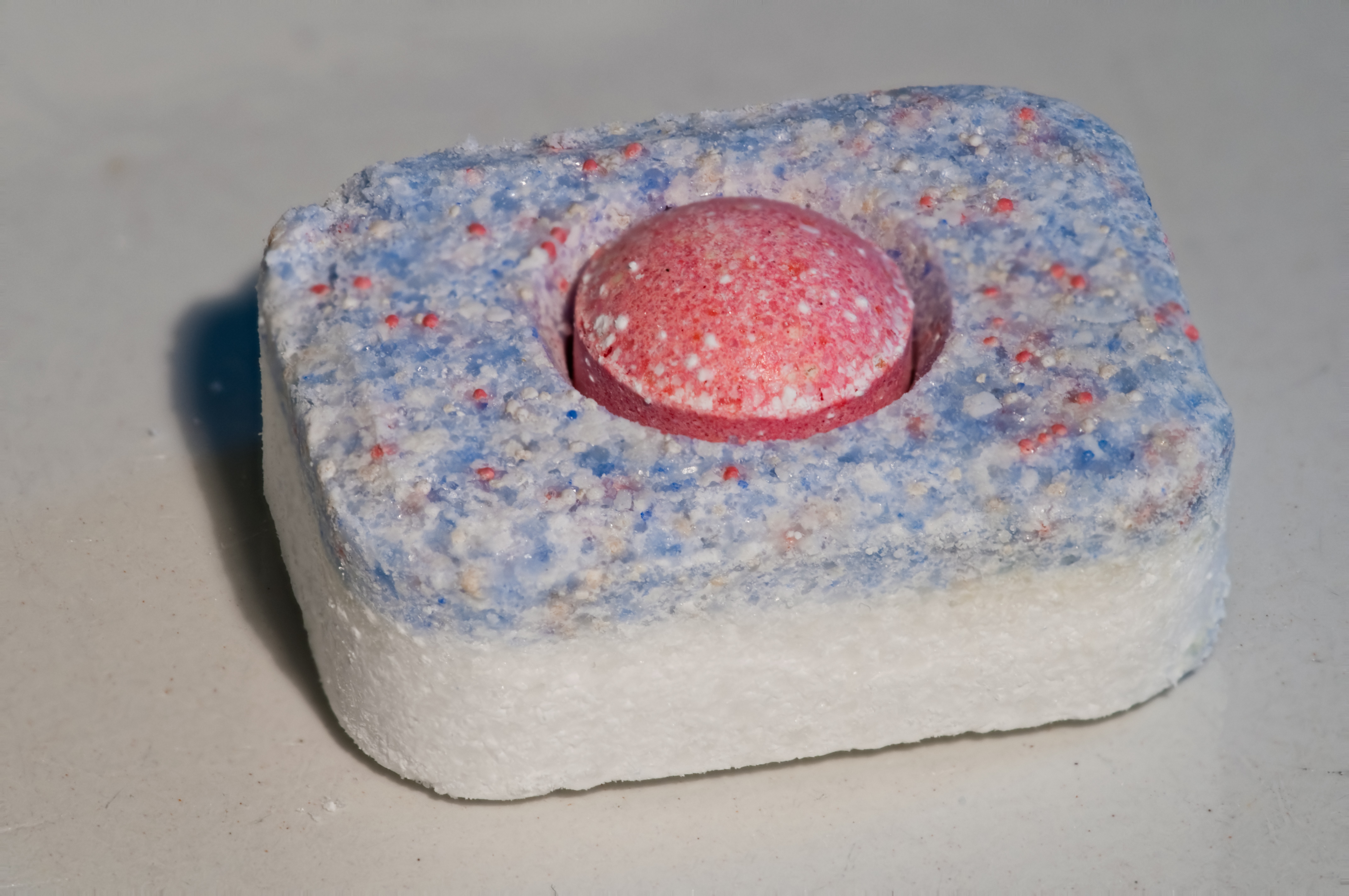
A detergent tablet

Dishwashers are designed to work using specially formulated dishwasher detergent. Over time, many regions have banned the use of phosphates in detergent and phosphorus-based compounds. They were previously used because they have properties that aid in effective cleaning. The concern was the increase in algal blooms in waterways caused by increasing phosphate levels (see eutrophication). Seventeen US states have partial or full bans on the use of phosphates in dish detergent, and two US states (Maryland and New York) ban phosphates in commercial dishwashing. Detergent companies claimed it is not cost effective to make separate batches of detergent for the states with phosphate bans, and so most have voluntarily removed phosphates from all dishwasher detergents.

In addition, rinse aids have contained nonylphenol and nonylphenol ethoxylates. These have been banned in the European Union by EU Directive 76/769/EEC.

In some regions, depending on water hardness, a dishwasher might function better with the use of a dishwasher salt.

=== Glassware ===
Glassware washed by dishwashing machines can develop a white haze on the surface over time. This may be caused by any or all of the below processes, of which only the first is reversible:

Deposition of minerals
Calcium carbonate (limescale) in hard water can deposit and build up on surfaces when water dries. The deposits can be dissolved by vinegar or another acid. Dishwashers often include ion exchange device to remove calcium and magnesium ions and replace them with sodium. The resultant sodium salts are water-soluble and don't tend to build up.
Silicate filming, etching, and accelerated crack corrosion
This film starts as an iridescence or "oil-film" effect on glassware, and progresses into a "milky" or "cloudy" appearance (which is not a deposit) that cannot be polished off or removed like limescale. It is formed because the detergent is strongly alkaline (basic) and glass dissolves slowly in alkaline aqueous solution. It becomes less soluble in the presence of silicates in the water (added as anti-metal-corrosion agents in the dishwasher detergent). Since the cloudy appearance is due to nonuniform glass dissolution, it is (somewhat paradoxically) less marked if dissolution is higher, i.e. if a silicate-free detergent is used; also, in certain cases, the etching will primarily be seen in areas that have microscopic surface cracks as a result of the items' manufacturing. Limitation of this undesirable reaction is possible by controlling water hardness, detergent load and temperature. The type of glass is an important factor in determining if this effect is a problem. Some dishwashers can reduce this etching effect by automatically dispensing the correct amount of detergent throughout the wash cycle based on the level of water hardness programmed.
Dissolution of lead
Lead in lead crystal can be converted into a soluble form by the high temperatures and strong alkali detergents of dishwashers, which could endanger the health of subsequent users.

=== Other materials ===
Other materials besides glass are also harmed by the strong detergents, strong agitation, and high temperatures of dishwashers, especially on a hot wash cycle when temperatures can reach 75 °C (167 °F). Aluminium, brass, and copper items will discolor, and light aluminum containers will mark other items they knock into. Nonstick pan coatings will deteriorate. Glossy, gold-colored, and hand-painted items will be dulled or fade. Fragile items and sharp edges will be dulled or damaged from colliding with other items or thermal stress. Sterling silver and pewter will oxidize and discolour from the heat and from contact with metals lower on the galvanic series such as stainless steel. Pewter has a low melting point and may warp in some dishwashers. Glued items, such as hollow-handle knives or wooden cutting boards, will melt or soften in a dishwasher; high temperatures and moisture damage wood. High temperatures damage many plastics, especially in the bottom rack close to an exposed heating element (many newer dishwashers have a concealed heating element away from the bottom rack entirely). Squeezing plastic items into small spaces may cause the plastic to distort in shape. Cast iron cookware is normally seasoned with oil or grease and heat, which causes the oil or grease to be absorbed into the pores of the cookware, thereby giving a smooth relatively non-stick cooking surface which is stripped off by the combination of alkali based detergent and hot water in a dishwasher.

Knives and other cooking tools that are made of carbon steel, semi-stainless steels like D2, or specialized, highly hardened cutlery steels like ZDP189 corrode in the extended moisture bath of dishwashers, compared to briefer baths of hand washing. Cookware is made of austenitic stainless steels, which are more stable.

Items contaminated by chemicals such as wax, cigarette ash, poisons, mineral oils, wet paints, oiled tools, furnace filters, etc. can contaminate a dishwasher, since the surfaces inside small water passages cannot be wiped clean as surfaces are in hand-washing, so contaminants remain to affect future loads. Objects contaminated by solvents may explode in a dishwasher.

=== Environmental comparison ===
Dishwashers use less water, and therefore less fuel to heat the water, than hand washing, except for small quantities washed in wash bowls without running water.

Hand-washing techniques vary by individual. According to a peer-reviewed study in 2003, hand washing and drying of an amount of dishes equivalent to a fully loaded automatic dishwasher (no cookware or bakeware) could use between 20 and 300 litres (5.3 and 79.3 US gal) of water and between 0.1 and 8 kWh of energy, while the numbers for energy-efficient automatic dishwashers were 15–22 litres (4.0–5.8 US gal) and 1 to 2 kWh, respectively. The study concluded that fully loaded dishwashers use less energy, water, and detergent than the average European hand-washer. For the automatic dishwasher results, the dishes were not rinsed before being loaded. The study does not address costs associated with the manufacture and disposal of dishwashers, the cost of possible accelerated wear of dishes from the chemical harshness of dishwasher detergent, the comparison for cleaning cookware, or the value of labour saved; hand washers needed between 65 and 106 minutes. Several points of criticism on this study have been raised. For example, kilowatt hours of electricity were compared against energy used for heating hot water without taking into account possible inefficiencies. Also, inefficient handwashings were compared against optimal usage of a fully loaded dishwasher without manual pre-rinsing that can take up to 100 litres (26 US gal) of water.

A 2009 study showed that the microwave and the dishwasher were both more effective ways to clean domestic sponges than handwashing.

== Commercial use ==
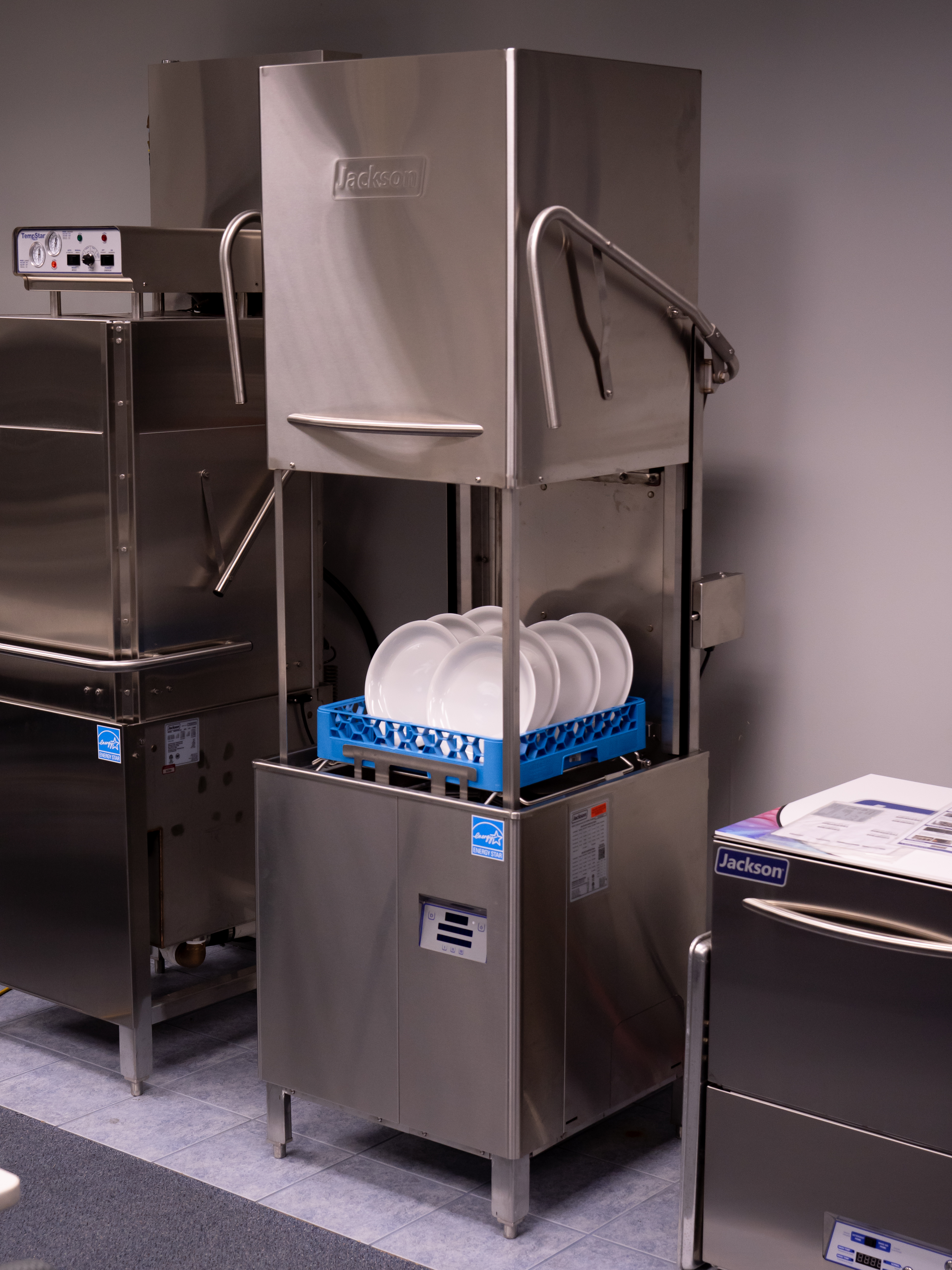
A commercial door-type dishwasher

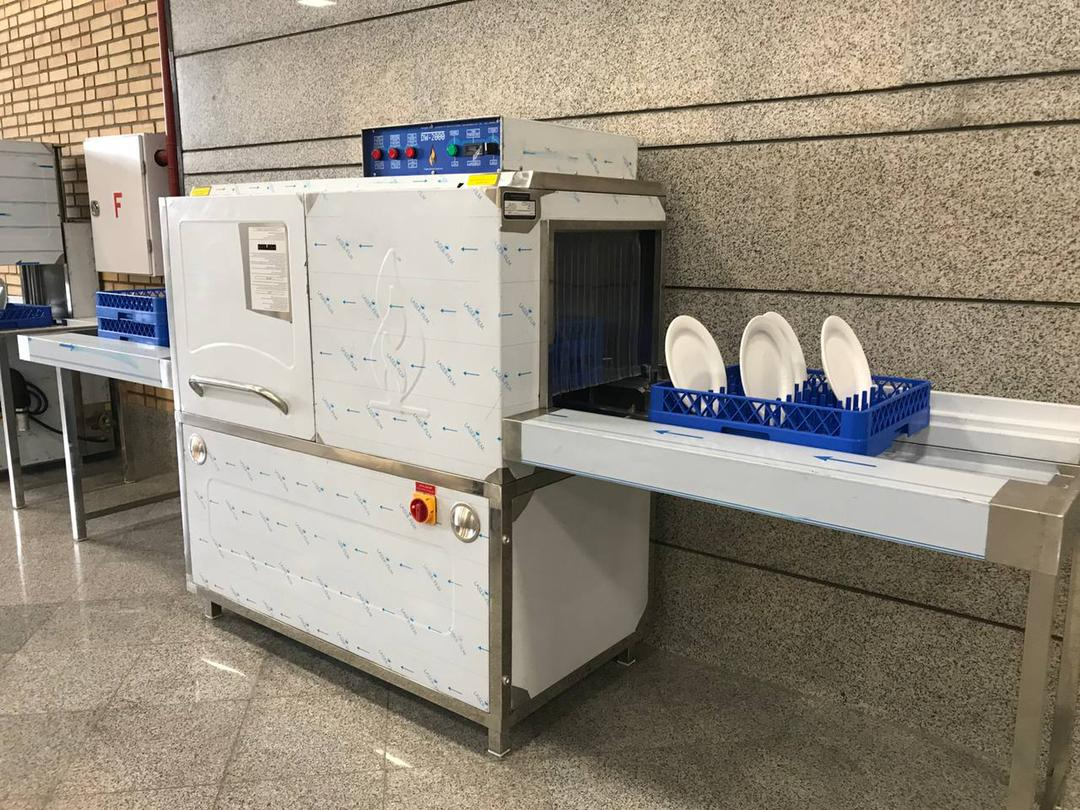
A conveyer-style dishwasher

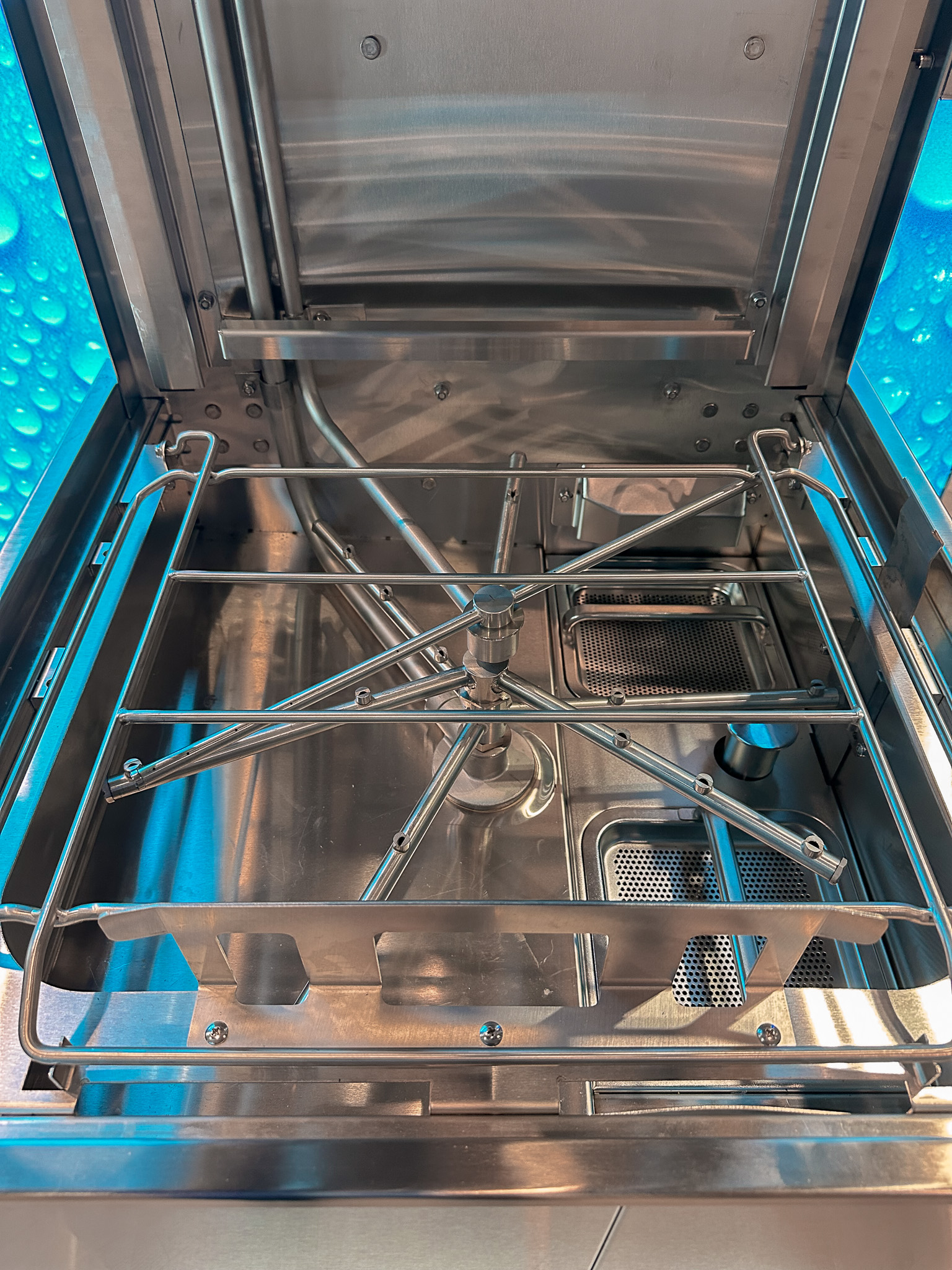
The inside of a commercial dishwasher

Heavy-duty dishwashers are used in commercial establishments (e.g. hotels, restaurants) where many dishes must be cleaned, utilizing the three-step process of washing, rinsing sanitization. There are many types of commercial dishwashers including under-counter, single tank, conveyor, flight type, and carousel machines. Single-rack washers require an operator to push the rack into the washer, close the doors, start the cycle, and then open the doors to pull out the cleaned rack, possibly through a second opening, into an unloading area. A "rack conveyor" system works similarly to a commercial car wash, with a pulley system that pulls the rack through a small chamber.

In the UK, the British Standards Institution set standards for dishwashers. In the US, NSF International (an independent not-for-profit organization) sets the standards for wash and rinse time along with minimum water temperature for chemical or hot-water sanitizing methods. Washing is typically conducted with 65–71 °C (149–160 °F) temperatures and sanitation is achieved by either the use of a booster heater that will provide the machine 82 °C (180 °F) "final rinse" temperature or through the use of a chemical sanitizer. This distinction labels the machines as either "high-temp" or "low-temp". A commercial dishwasher does not utilize a drying cycle, with drying achieved by heated ware meeting open air once the wash cycle has been completed, and is thus significantly faster than its residential counterpart.

Commercial dishwashers often have significantly different plumbing and operations than a home unit, in that there are often separate sprayers for washing and rinsing/sanitizing. The wash water is heated with an in-tank electric heat element and mixed with a cleaning solution, and is used repeatedly from one load to the next. Additional soap is periodically added to the main wash-water tank, from either large soap concentrate tanks or dissolved from a large solid soap block, to maintain wash-water cleaning effectiveness. The wash tank usually has a large strainer basket to collect food debris, which may only be emptied at the end of the day.

Water used for rinsing and sanitizing is generally delivered directly through building water supply and is not reusable. However, commercial dishwashers excel in water efficiency, with some models using less than 0.4 gallons of water per rack. Used rinse water empties into the wash-tank reservoir, which dilutes some of the used wash water and causes a small amount to drain out through an overflow tube.

== Penetration rates ==
The rate of adoption for dishwashers varies significantly from country to country. A variety of social, economic, and cultural factors influence the market penetration of dishwashers in different nations.

=== United States ===
Since the 1950s, dishwashers have been popular in the United States. The increase in adoption rates of dishwashers in the US relative to other countries has been attributed to cultural attitudes around housework, widespread adoption of hot water systems, and innovation within the dishwasher industry. According to the Energy Information Administration's 2015 Residential Energy Consumption Survey, approximately 75% of all households have a dishwasher, with 54% of households using them more than once per week.

Built-in dishwashers occupy more than 50% of the dishwasher market, being most popular in suburban homes, as smaller urban homes do not have layouts which support built-in dishwashers.

=== Europe ===
Dishwasher penetration rates vary between European nations. In general, Western European countries such as Germany maintain high dishwasher penetration rates above 70%, while dishwasher ownership remains below 30% in countries such as Greece and Romania. The primary constraint is outdated plumbing, with more than 40% of households in Southeastern Europe lacking the infrastructure needed for dishwasher installation. Landlords also rarely include dishwashers as standard fixtures as opposed to Western European countries and the United States.

Built-in dishwashers occupy 66.5% of the dishwasher market, with 74% of newly constructed apartments in Germany, France, and the Netherlands including integrated dishwashers. The prevalence of integrated dishwashers allow for high penetration rates relative to the United States despite smaller average household size.

=== China ===
The dishwasher penetration rate in China is estimated to be only 3.2%. One reason for the relatively low penetration rate compared to the United States and Europe is due to kitchen size. Kitchens usually only span 5 square meters, requiring optimized designs to be properly accommodated. Additionally, Chinese cooking involves heavy use of oil, which hinders the performance of standard dishwashers and requires more intensive wash modes.

=== India ===
Only 0.5% of Indian households own a dishwasher. This extremely low rate is attributed to small kitchen sizes and the difficulty that traditional dishwashers have cleaning stains caused by Indian spices. Dishwashers also face competition from the low cost of domestic help in India.

Due to ease of adoption, freestanding dishwashers occupy the majority of the market, with more than 95% of the market share.

== Alternative uses ==
Dishwashers can be used to cook foods at low temperatures (e.g. dishwasher salmon). The foods are generally sealed in canning jars or oven bags since even a dishwasher cycle without soap can deposit residual soap and rinse aid from previous cycles on unsealed foods.

Dishwashers also have been documented to be used to clean potatoes, other root vegetables, garden tools, sneakers or trainers, silk flowers, some sporting goods, plastic hairbrushes, baseball caps, plastic toys, toothbrushes, flip-flops, contact lens cases, a mesh filter from a range hood, refrigerator shelves and bins, toothbrush holders, pet bowls and pet toys. Cleaning vegetables and plastics is controversial since vegetables can be contaminated by soap and rinse aid from previous cycles and the heat of most standard dishwashers can cause BPA or phthalates to leach out of plastic products. The use of a dishwasher to clean greasy tools and parts is not recommended as the grease can clog the dishwasher.

== See also ==
- Home appliance
- Washing machine
