= Senator Chafee =

Senator Chafee may refer to:

- George D. Chafee (1839–1927), Illinois State Senate
- John Chafee (1922–1999), U.S. Senator from Rhode Island from 1976 to 1999 and father of Lincoln
- Lincoln Chafee (born 1953), U.S. Senator from Rhode Island from 1999 to 2007

== See also ==
- Jerome B. Chaffee (1825–1886), U.S. Senator from Colorado from 1876 to 1879
