= Dishwasher salt =

Salt component used in dishwashers to prevent limescale formation

Dishwasher salt is a particular grade of granulated, crystalline sodium chloride intended for regenerating the water softener circuit of household or industrial dishwashers. Analogous to water softener salt, dishwasher salt regenerates ion exchange resins, expelling the therein trapped calcium and magnesium ions that characterize hard water. Dishwater salt granules are larger than those of table salt. The granule size ensures that the salt dissolves slowly, and that fine particles do not block the softener unit.

Dishwasher salt is unsuitable for cooking as it is not considered food grade and therefore may contain toxic elements.

In some countries, especially those in Europe, dishwashers include a built-in water softener that removes calcium and magnesium ions from the water. Dishwasher salt, which is coarse-grained sodium chloride (table salt), is used to regenerate the resin in the built-in ion-exchange system. The coarse grains prevent it from clogging the softener unit. Unlike certain types of salt used for culinary purposes, it does not contain added anticaking agents or magnesium salts. The presence of magnesium salts will defeat the purpose of removing magnesium from the water softener. Anticaking agents may lead to clogging or may contain magnesium. Table salt may contain added iodine in the form of sodium iodide or potassium iodide. These compounds will not affect the ion-exchange system, but adding table salt to the dishwasher's water softening unit can damage it.

If a dishwasher has a built-in water softener there will be a special compartment inside the dishwasher where the salt is to be added when needed. This salt compartment is separate from the detergent compartment, and generally located at the bottom of the wash cabinet (this is below the bottom basket). On most dishwashers, an automatic sensing system will notify the user when more dishwasher salt is required.

If the dishwasher has run out of the salt that regenerates the ion exchange resin that softens the water, and the water supply is "hard", limescale deposits can appear on all items, but are especially visible on glassware.

In areas with soft water there is no need to use dishwasher salt for the machine to work. There is an option to adjust the water hardness making the machine to use no amount of salt brine for every dish cycle.
