= Chautauqua Auditorium (Shelbyville, Illinois) =

- U.S. National Register of Historic Places
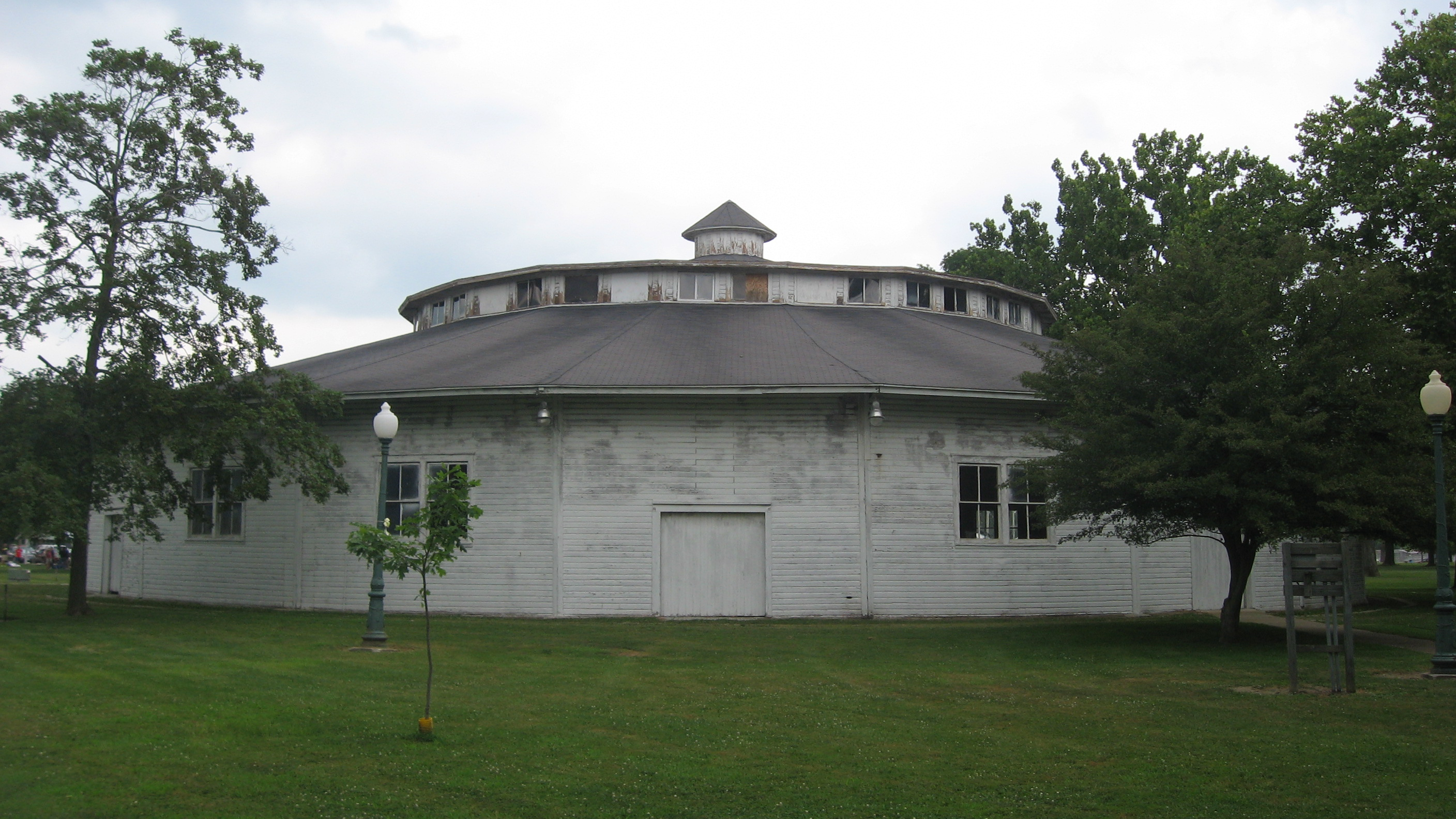
- View from the south

- Location within Illinois Location within the United States
- Location: Forest Park and NE 9th St., Shelbyville, Illinois
- Coordinates: 39°25′5″N 88°47′24″W
- Built: 1903
- Architect: Morrison H. Vail
- NRHP reference No.: 78001190
- Added to NRHP: January 30, 1978

The Chautauqua Auditorium, built in 1903, is a large historic icosagonal (20-sided) wooden chautauqua meeting hall located at Forest Park and North East 9th Street, Shelbyville, Illinois, United States. On January 30, 1978, it was added to the National Register of Historic Places.

It is the largest building of its kind anywhere in the world. The building was constructed by a local bridge builder and designed with a unique system of structural support. Because of this, there are no interior pillars to block the view of the stage.

The large stage features three female Grecian statues representing Art, Music and Drama. These statues were works from renowned Illinois artist and Shelbyville native Robert Root.

In 2009 Landmarks Illinois declared it one of the 10 most endangered historic places in Illinois. The building is in need of extensive repairs which are estimated to cost $1,750,000. The city of Shelbyville which owns the auditorium has threatened to tear it down if repairs cannot be made within 2 years. The Chautauqua Auditorium Preservation Committee is working on funding for a four-phase renovation project.

In 2020, 60% of local residents voted in favor of restoring the historic auditorium instead of demolishing it. Required restoration work included structural repairs, a new roof and floor, painting and a new stage. These preservation efforts were supported by Landmarks Illinois. The Chautauqua reopened in September 2021.
