= Augusta Cottlow =

American pianist (1878 - 1954)

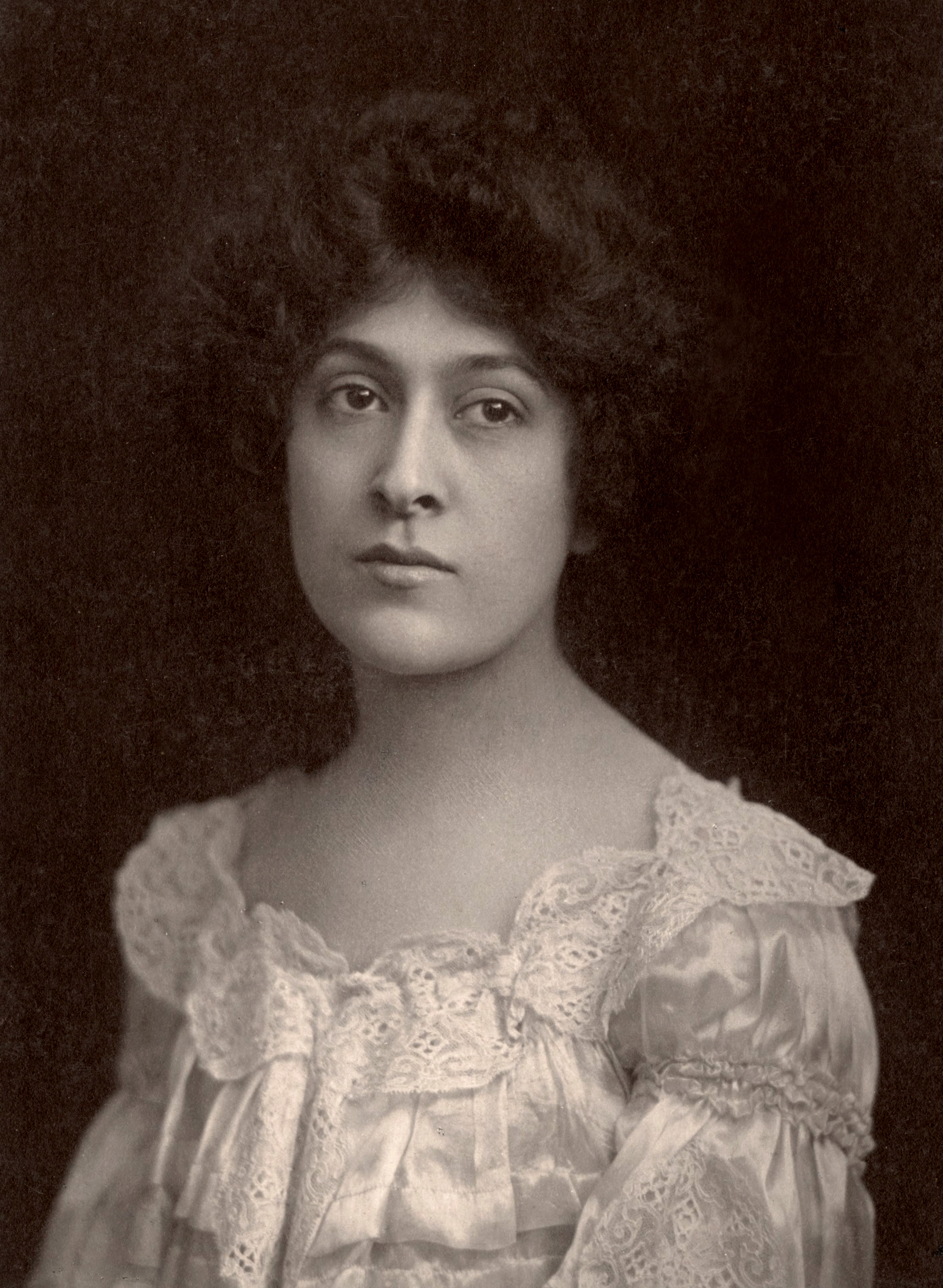
Augusta Cottlow c. 1902

Augusta Cottlow (April 2, 1878 — April 11, 1954) was an American pianist of the early 20th century, and a child musical prodigy in the 1880s.

== Early life ==
Augusta Cottlow was born and raised in Shelbyville, Illinois, the daughter of Morris Cottlow and Selina Cottlow. Her mother was her first piano teacher. From the age of six years, she was recognized as a child musical prodigy; she gave a series of concerts to raise money for her further study in Berlin and Vienna. In Chicago, she studied piano with Carl Wolfsohn and composition with Frederick Grant Gleason. Ferruccio Busoni was one of her mentors while in Europe.

== Career ==
As an adult performer, Cottlow toured in the United States, while based in Bronxville, New York. "If one would characterize Miss Cottlow in a single phrase," proposed one critic, "he would say that she is positively an ascetic in her devotion to the beautiful piano tone." She played at Carnegie Hall in 1901, at a hospital benefit. In 1912, she gave a recital at the White House for President William Howard Taft. Augusta Cottlow rarely gave public performances after 1925, but continued performing privately, and taught piano.

== Personal life ==
Augusta Cottlow married a fellow musician, Edgar Anspacher Gerst of California, in 1912, in New York City. They had a daughter, Selina Adelaide (1915–1916), while living in Germany. Late in life, Augusta Cottlow corresponded with Harry S Truman, who had heard her perform three times in Kansas City as a young man. She died in 1954, in White Plains, New York, aged 76 years. A trunk marked with Cottlow's name is in the collection of the Ogle County Historical Society in Oregon, Illinois.
