= Robert Marshall Root =

American impressionist painter

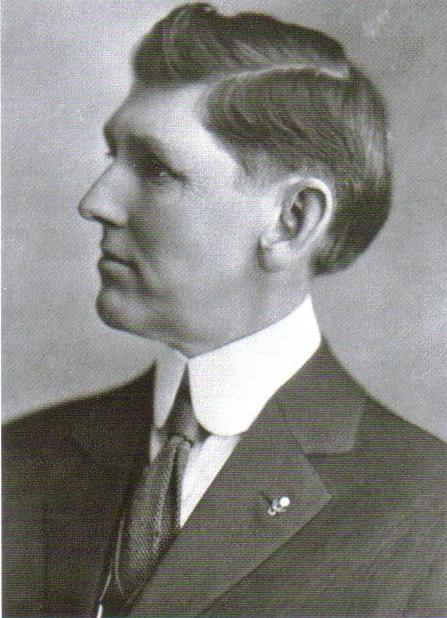

Robert Marshall Root (March 20, 1863 – August 21, 1937) was an influential American tonalist and impressionist artist.

== Youth ==
Robert Marshall Root was born in the city of Shelbyville, Illinois, on March 20, 1863, in the midst of the American Civil War. Third and youngest son of John and Eunice Root, Robert showed artistic promise from an early age. His career started, allegedly, after watching a local artist, L. A. Birk, make pencil drawings of a prominent house in Shelbyville, after which he got himself a board, some pencils, and started to draw with him.

Root began his academic studies in the Shelby County school system. While in his youth, young Robert became enamored with the various magazines and comics that he would read at his family's general store in Shelbyville. Upon graduating from high school in approximately 1881, young Robert was accepted into studies at the prestigious Cooper Union in New York City to pursue a career in the visual arts. Unfortunately, Robert returned home only after a few months of study in New York City. He started to reach down into his artistic will and began a career as a sign painter in Shelbyville. Given his ability, Root began to make many friends in and around Shelbyville. He was able to parlay this success into an application and subsequent admission into Washington University in St. Louis. While there, Root excelled in his artistic studies, learning a great appreciation for the aesthetic and serene. He graduated from the University, earning the highest academic and artistic honors.
