= Shelby County Courthouse (Illinois) =

Local government building in the United States

- U.S. Historic district – Contributing property
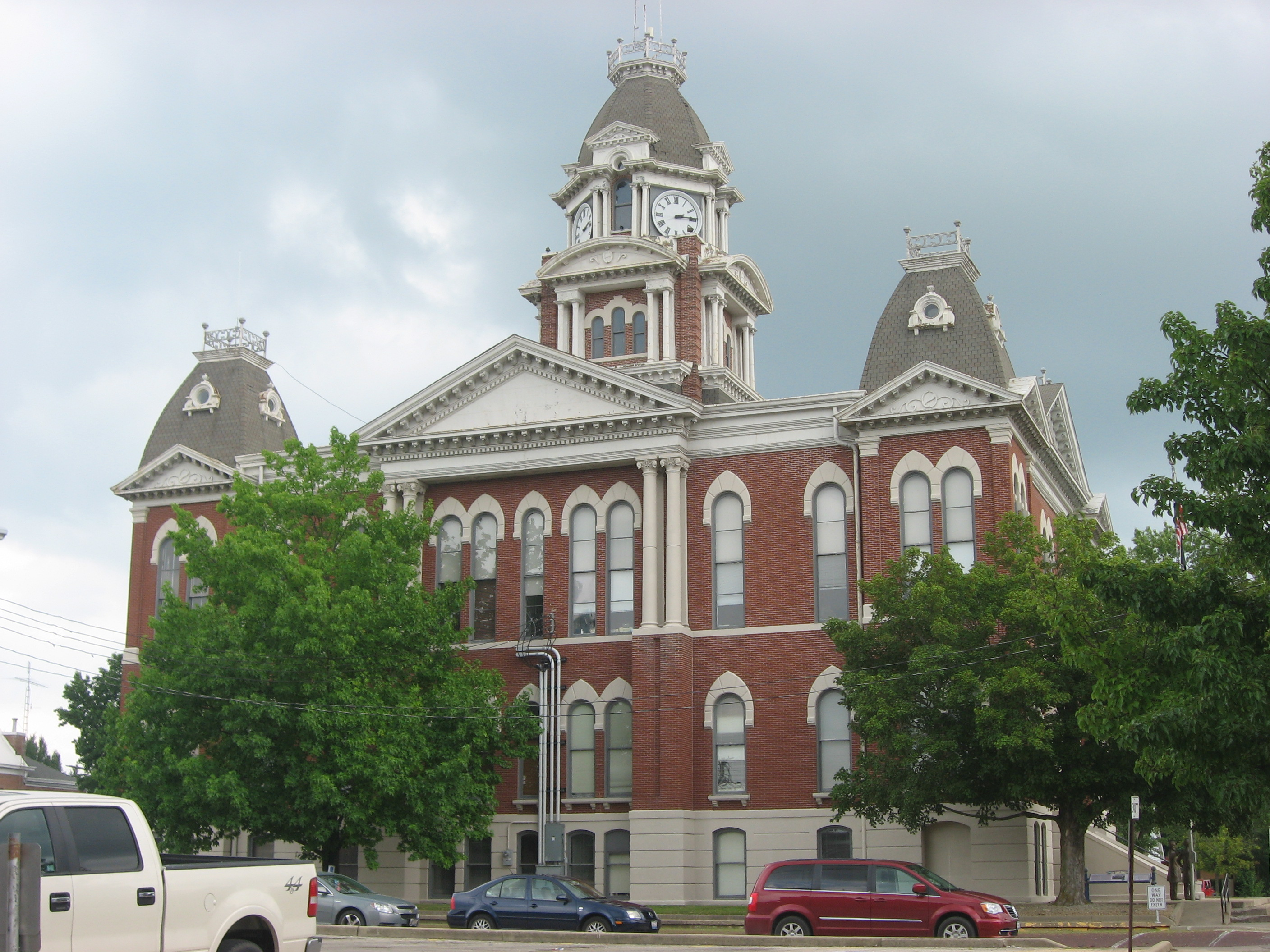
- Western side

- Location within Illinois Location within the United States
- Interactive map showing the location of Shelby County Courthouse
- Location: 301 E. Main Street, Shelbyville, Illinois
- Coordinates: 39°24′25″N 88°47′27″W
- Built: 1881
- Architectural style: Second Empire
- Part of: Shelbyville Historic District (ID76000729)
- Added to NRHP: December 22, 1976

The Shelby County Courthouse is a government building in Shelbyville, the county seat of Shelby County, Illinois, United States. Completed in 1881, it is the third courthouse in the county's history.

== First courthouse ==
Shelby County was created by an 1827 law that provided for a temporary county seat at the home of one Barnet Bone. The same law provided for the creation of a commission to choose a location for a new county seat and directed that it be named "Shelbyville". A location having been ascertained, the county commissioners began preparing to build a courthouse by the end of 1827. William Hall completed the building in 1828 and was paid $110, and further work was done in 1829 to weatherboard the exterior and improve the interior. This was a log building measuring 20 by 24 feet (6.1 m × 7.3 m) and two stories tall, with ends rising to gables. Its main entrance sat in the side of the first floor, like that of an English barn, while the second floor was accessed by means of an exterior staircase on one end.

== Second courthouse ==
In 1832, county officials paid $1,094 for the construction of a later courthouse. A two-story square measuring 40 feet (12 m) on each side, it contained a first-story courtroom with office space for county government on the second story. A cupola was added in 1837, built on a square base that sat at the joint of the four parts of the building's hip roof. Three windows pierced each side of the building on each story. This courthouse served Shelby County well for more than thirty years, but gradually it too became too small to house all of the county officials, and efforts to replace it began in 1864.

== Third courthouse ==
Periodically through the 1860s and 1870s, county officials tried to find money to erect a new courthouse, but all attempts proved abortive until 1879, when $70,000 was appropriated and a special tax levied on real and personal property countywide. The original plans called for it to measure 110 by 76 feet (34 m × 23 m), with county offices placed on the first floor and court-related rooms on the second. Among the interior features were gas lines, steam heat, and running water with toilets, together with ordinary features such as a burglar-proof strongroom. Its walls are primarily brick with a stone foundation, pierced by pairs of windows and topped with a mansard roof atop a tower on each of the building's corners. Three pediments of various sizes top the front facades, with pilasters connecting them to the foundation. Fireproofing was a major goal during the construction process, and some structural elements were included with the goal of fire resistance, such as the dome (made of iron) and the roof (made of slate). At the center, above the dome, stands a tower that employs elements used elsewhere, including stonework, pilasters below pediments, and a mansard roof. Its overall appearance is that of the Second Empire style. This tower was modified in 1928 by the addition of a public clock that had been used in a school that sat on Main Street until the previous year. Some of the more artistic elements included the choice of Bedford limestone for the pilasters and a pair of statues of Liberty and Justice. Outside stands the county's Civil War memorial, which was placed in 1907.

== Preservation ==
Before the current courthouse's completion, local officials hoped that it would be one of Illinois' foremost courthouses, and an 1881 county history stated the following:

The citizens of Shelby county [sic] may well feel proud of this elegant and valuable structure. Alike is it creditable to the foresight and energy of the men who inaugurated its construction; and it will remain as a monument to their enterprise years after they have passed away.

The 1881 courthouse has continued to be used into the 21st century. It is a key component of the Shelbyville Historic District, which was listed on the National Register of Historic Places in 1976.
