= Energy factor =

An energy factor is a metric used in the United States to compare the energy conversion efficiency of residential appliances and equipment. The energy factor is currently used for rating the efficiency of water heaters, dishwashers, clothes washers, and clothes dryers. The term is used by the United States Department of Energy to develop and enforce minimum energy conservation standards under the Energy Conservation Program.

The higher the energy factor, the more efficient the appliance should be.

Although the term energy factor is used to compare the relative efficiency of these appliances, the metric is defined differently for all four appliance categories. The energy factor is expressed in terms of site energy, which excludes losses through energy conversion. All of these efficiency metrics are defined by Department of Energy test procedures.

== Water heaters ==
The energy factor metric only applies to residential water heaters, which are currently defined by fuel, type, and input capacity. Generally, the EF number represents the thermal efficiency of the water heater as a percentage, since it is an average of the ratio of the theoretical heat required to raise the temperature of water drawn to the amount of energy actually consumed by the water heater.

Residential water heaters
Fuel	Type	Input capacity
Natural Gas	Storage	≤75 kBtu/h
Fuel Oil	Storage	≤105 kBtu/h
Electric	Storage	≤12 kW
Tabletop	Storage	≤12 kW
Natural Gas	Instantaneous	<200 kBtu/hr
Electric	Instantaneous	≤12 kW

=== Test procedure ===
The energy factor is determined using a stylized hot water use pattern. Hot water is drawn in six equal draws totaling 64.3 US gallons (243 L), and a standby period of 18 hours follows.

The energy factor for residential water heaters is determined using the results from the 24-hour simulated use test. During the test 64.3±1.0 gallons of water are drawn from the water heater in six equally spaced draws that begin one hour apart. The hot water flow rate for each draw is 3.0±0.25 gallons per minute. After the beginning of the last draw a standby period of 18 hours follows. During the test, the test conditions must be operated at a specified value and accuracy. Heat pump water heaters (HPWHs) have different values specified for ambient air temperature and relative humidity.

Specified test conditions
Measurement	Required value and accuracy
Inlet water temperature	58 °F±2 °F
Outlet water temperature	135 °F±5 °F
Ambient air temperature	67.5 °F±2.5 °F
Ambient air temperature (HPWHs only)	67.5 °F±1 °F
Ambient relative humidity (HPWHs only)	50%±1%

From the standard test procedure, the energy factor is defined as

$$EF=\sum\limits_{i=1}^6 \frac{M_i C_{pi}\left( 135^\circ F-58^\circ F\right)}{Q_{dm}},$$

where $Q_{dm}$ is the modified daily water heating energy consumption (Btu), $M_i$ is the mass withdrawn from the i^{th} draw (lb), and $C_{pi}$ is the specific heat of the water of the i^{th} draw Btu/lb°F, evaluated at the midpoint between 58 and 135 °F (14 and 57 °C).

=== Uniform energy factor (UEF) ===
As of 2021 the Uniform Energy Factor (UEF) is newest measure of water heater overall efficiency according to the Department of Energy’s test method outlined in 10 CFR Part 430, Subpart B, Appendix E.

=== Energy conservation standards ===
Minimum federal energy conservation standards are defined by fuel, type, and rated storage volume. All standards are calculated as a function of the rated storage volume V in gallons. The current conservation standards are less efficient than the standards that go into effect in 2015.

Energy Conservation Standards
Fuel	Type	Rated Storage Volume	Energy Factor (Effective April 16, 2015)	Energy Factor
Natural Gas	Storage	≥ 20 gal and ≤ 55 gal	0.675 − 0.0015V	0.67 − 0.0019V
Natural Gas	Storage	> 55 gal and ≤ 100 gal	0.8012 − 0.00078V	0.67 − 0.0019V
Fuel Oil	Storage	≤ 50 gal	0.68 − 0.0019V	0.59 − 0.0019V
Electric	Storage	≥ 20 gal and ≤ 55 gal	0.960 − 0.0003V	0.97 − 0.00132V
Electric	Storage	> 55 gal and ≤ 120 gal	2.057 − 0.00113V	0.97 − 0.00132V
Tabletop	Storage	≥ 20 gal and ≤ 100 gal	0.93 − 0.00132V	0.93 − 0.00132V
Natural Gas	Instantaneous	< 2 gal	0.82 − 0.0019V	0.62 − 0.0019V
Electric	Instantaneous	< 2 gal	0.93 − 0.00132V	0.93 − 0.00132V

== Dishwashers ==
The energy factor for dishwashers is defined as "the number of cycles per kWh of input power [sic]."

== Clothes washers ==
The energy factor for clothes washers, is defined as "the cubic foot capacity per kWh of input power per cycle."

== Clothes dryers ==
The energy factor for clothes dryers is defined as "the number of pounds of clothes dried per kWh of power consumed."

== See also ==
- Energy star
