= Josephine Cochrane =

American inventor (1839–1913)

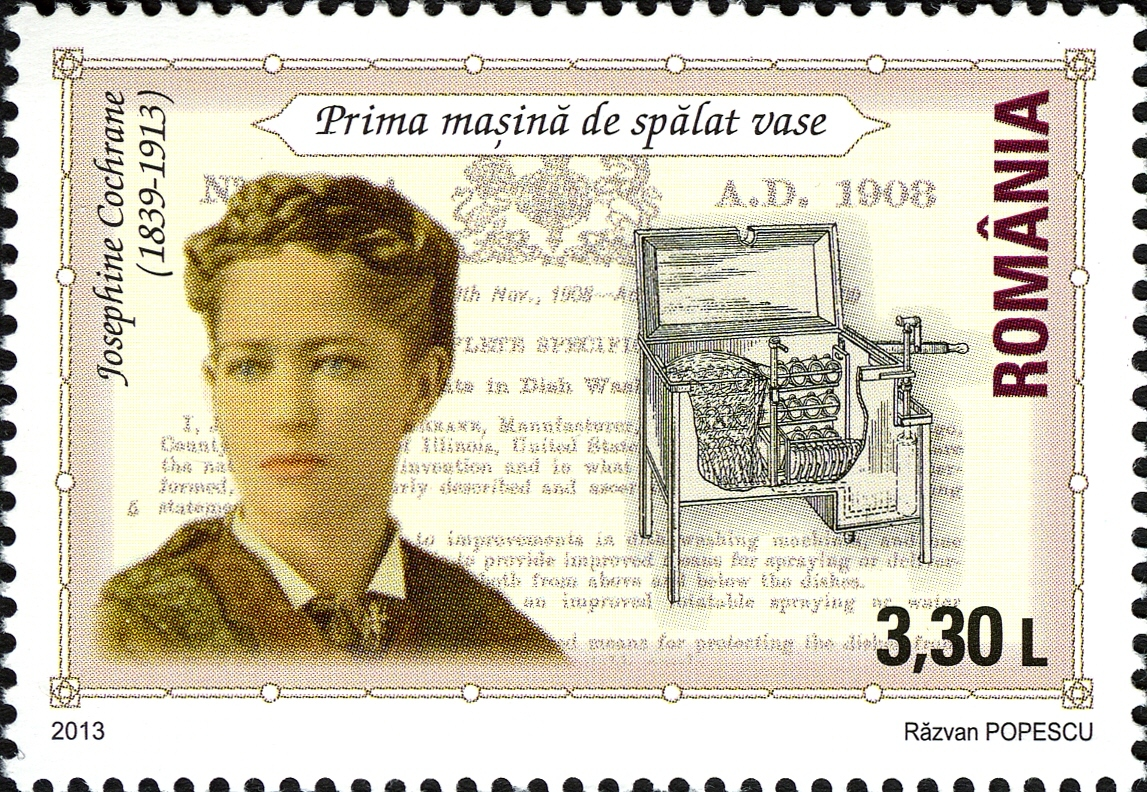
- Stamp of Romania, 2013
- Born: Josephine Garis; March 8, 1839; Ashtabula County, Ohio, U.S.
- Died: August 3, 1913 (aged 74); Chicago, Illinois, U.S.
- Known for: Inventor of a popular model of dishwasher
- Spouse: William Cochran (m. 1858)
- Children: 2

Josephine Cochran (later Cochrane; née Garis; March 8, 1839 – August 3, 1913) was an American inventor who invented and manufactured the first successful hand-powered dishwasher.

Once her patent issued on December 28, 1886, she founded Garis-Cochrane Manufacturing Company to manufacture her machines. Cochrane showed her new machine at the World's Columbian Exposition in Chicago in 1893 where nine Garis-Cochran washers were installed in the restaurants and pavilions of the fair and was met with interest from restaurants and hotels, where hot water access was not an issue. She won the prize for "best mechanical construction, durability and adaptation to its line of work" at the Fair. Garis-Cochran Manufacturing Company, which built dishwashers, grew through a focus on hotels and other commercial customers and was renamed as Cochran's Crescent Washing Machine Company in 1897.

Cochran's Crescent Washing Machine Company became part of KitchenAid through acquisition by Hobart Manufacturing Company several years after Cochran's death in 1913. Cochran was posthumously inducted into the National Inventors Hall of Fame in 2006 for patent 355,139 issued on December 28, 1886, for her invention of the dishwasher.

== Biography ==
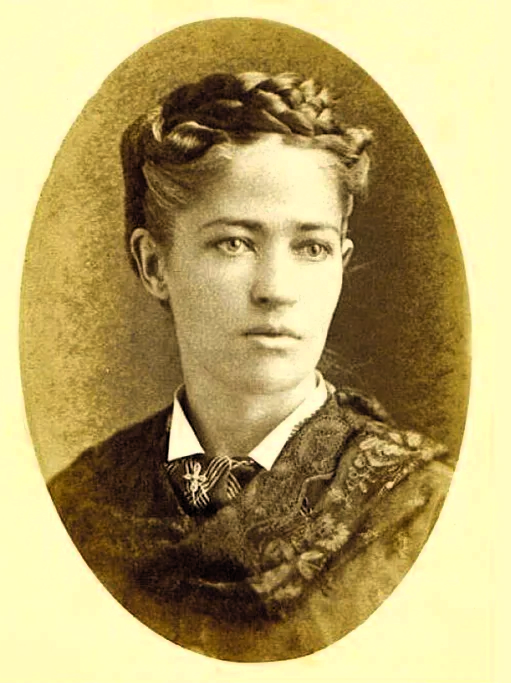
Portrait of Josephine Garis Cochrane as a young woman.

She was born Josephine Garis in Ashtabula County, Ohio, on March 8, 1839, and raised in Valparaiso, Indiana. She was the daughter of John Garis, a civil engineer, and Irene Fitch Garis, and was the granddaughter of an innovator.

After moving to her sister's home in Shelbyville, Illinois, she married William Cochran (later Cochrane) on October 13, 1858. William had returned the year before from a disappointing try at the California Gold Rush but had gone on to become a prosperous dry goods merchant and Democratic Party politician. She took her husband's name but spelt it with an e on the end. Josephine and William had 2 children: Hallie and Katharine.

In 1870, the family moved into a mansion, and Cochrane joined Chicago society. After one dinner party, some of the heirloom dishes were chipped while being washed, prompting her to search for a better alternative to handwashing. She also wanted to relieve tired housewives from the duty of washing dishes after a meal.

=== Cochrane’s dishwasher ===
Other attempts had been made to produce a commercially viable dishwasher. In 1850 Joel Houghton designed a hand-cranked dish soaker, In the 1860s, L.A. Alexander improved on the device with a geared mechanism that allowed the user to spin racked dishes through a tub of water. Neither device was particularly effective. Josephine Cochrane's invention of the dishwashing machine eventually became a success. However, this not only took a great deal of time and effort, but she also faced numerous obstacles in her journey to becoming a successful female innovator. Following the death of her husband in 1883, Cochrane was left with only $1,535.59 (about the equivalent of US$47,000 today) and a significant amount of debt, which she had to pay off.

After filing her first patent application on December 31, 1885, she began developing a prototype of her product. Cochrane designed the first model of her dishwasher in the shed behind her house in Shelbyville, Illinois. She then hired her first employee, a young mechanic name George Butters, to assist her in the construction of the dishwasher. To build the machine, she first measured the dishes and built wire compartments, each specially designed to fit either plates, cups, or saucers. The compartments were placed inside a wheel that lay flat inside a copper boiler. A motor turned the wheel while hot soapy water squirted up from the bottom of the boiler and rained down on the dishes. Their dishwasher was the first to use water pressure instead of scrubbers to clean the dishes inside the machine. She received a patent on December 28, 1886.

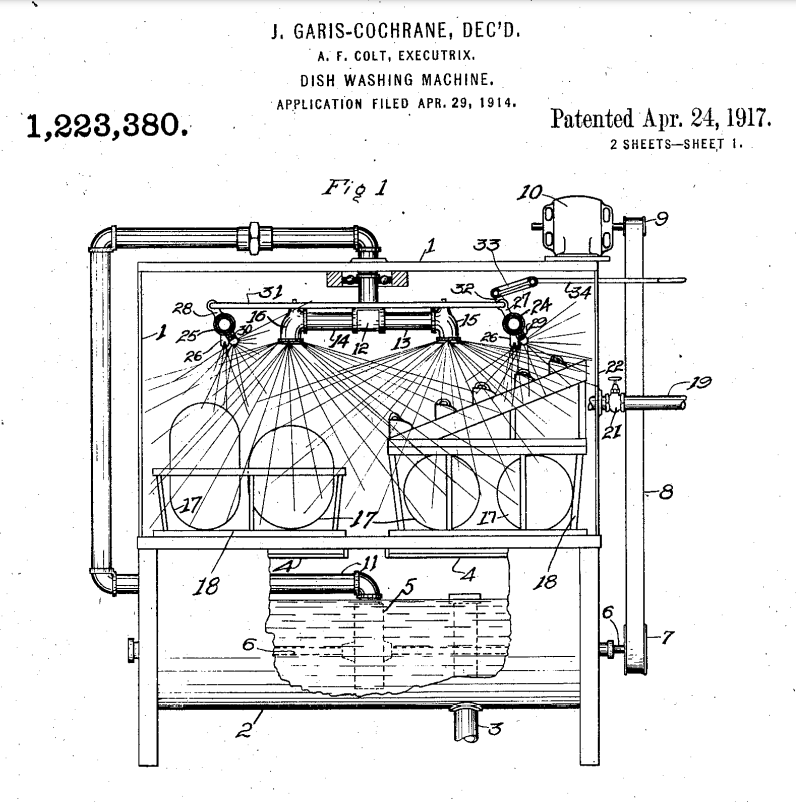
An improved model from 1914, US Patent 1,223,380.

A challenge she faced was selling her product to individual households, specifically housewives. The first dishwashers were too expensive for an average household, costing between $75 and $100, which most women would not spend on an item for their kitchen even if it meant easing the effort they had to put in washing dishes. In addition, most homes in that era were not equipped to handle the machine's requirements for hot water. However, years later, homes began adding boilers that were big enough to meet those requirements, eventually allowing Cochrane to sell to housewives.

The World's Columbian Exposition in 1893 was pivotal in Cochrane's business, as other companies relying heavily on investors were wiped out the same year in the Panic of 1893. Following the exposition, many restaurants and hotels placed orders (with colleges and hospitals delayed in following due to sanitation requirements). In 1898, she opened her own factory with George Butters as manager so she could extend her sales north and south, reaching from Mexico to Alaska.

Her main customers continued to be hotels and restaurants; it was not until the 1950s that dishwashers became popular for home usage. In 1926, her company was sold to KitchenAid, now part of Whirlpool Corporation.

=== Death and recognition ===
Cochrane either died of a stroke or exhaustion in Chicago, Illinois, on August 3, 1913, aged 74, and was buried in Glenwood Cemetery in Shelbyville, Illinois. In 2006, she was inducted into the National Inventors Hall of Fame.
