= George D. Chafee =

American politician and lawyer

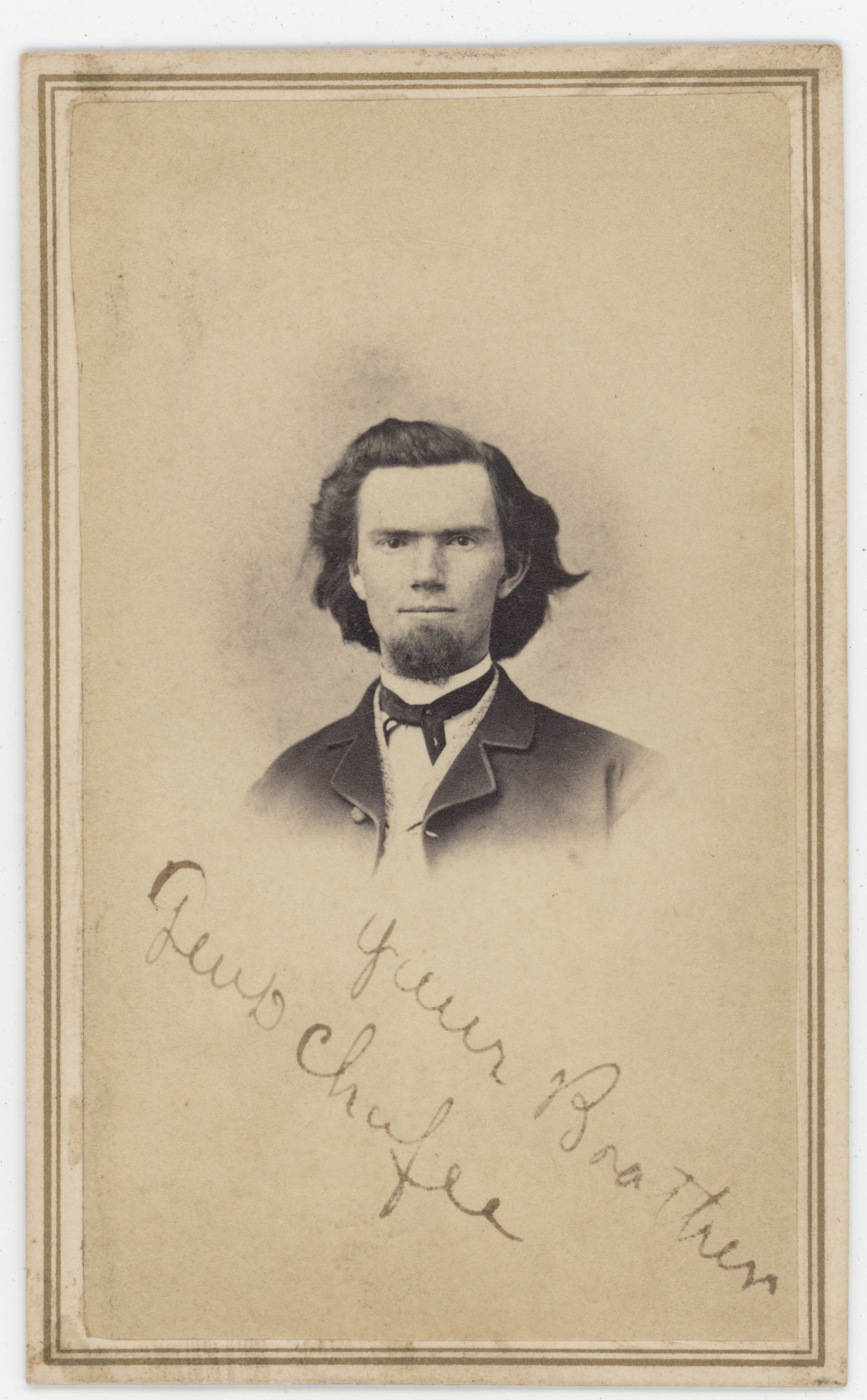
George Daniel Chafee 18-63-1866, Shelbyville

George Daniel Chafee (July 2, 1839 – March 6, 1927) was an American politician and lawyer.

Chafee was born in Pittsford, Vermont. He moved with his family to Monroe County, Michigan. Chafee graduated from University of Michigan with his law degree. Chafee then moved to Shelbyville, Illinois, in 1861, to practice law. During the American Civil War, Chafee served on the local draft board. Chafee served in the Illinois House of Representatives in 1881 and 1882 and was a Republican. He also served in the Illinois Senate from 1905 to 1909. Chafee died at his home in Shelbyville, Illinois.
