= Shelbyville, Illinois =

- City
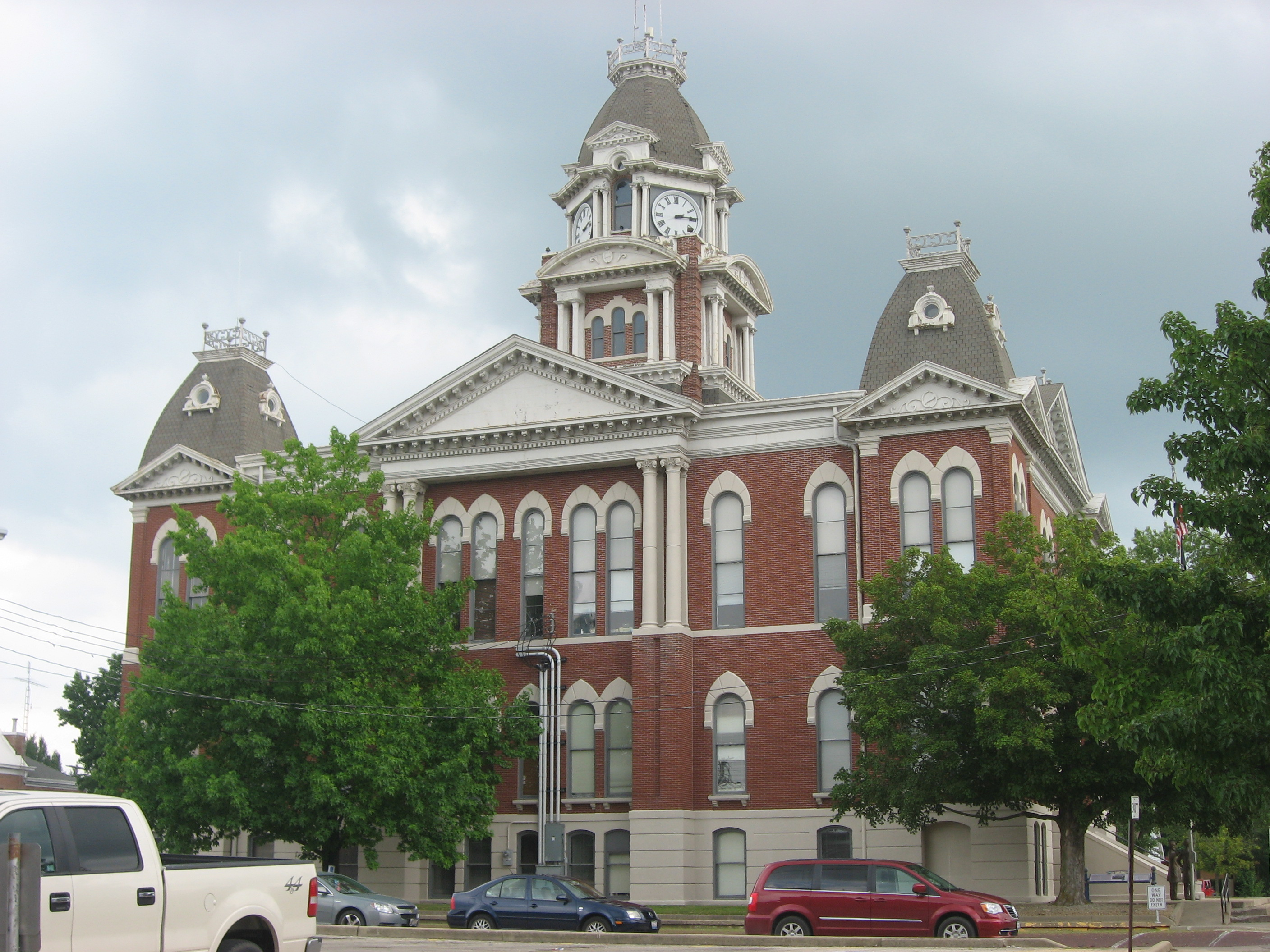
- Shelby County Courthouse
- Interactive map of Shelbyville, Illinois
- Location within Illinois Location within the United States
- Coordinates: 39°24′35″N 88°48′02″W
- Country: United States
- State: Illinois
- County: Shelby
- Townships: Shelbyville, Rose

Area
  - Total: 4.27 sq mi (11.05 km^{2})
  - Land: 4.08 sq mi (10.56 km^{2})
  - Water: 0.19 sq mi (0.48 km^{2})
- Elevation: 637 ft (194 m)

Population (2020)
  - Total: 4,674
  - Density: 1,145.9/sq mi (442.42/km^{2})
- Time zone: UTC-6 (CST)
  - Summer (DST): UTC-5 (CDT)
- ZIP code: 62565
- Area code: 217
- FIPS code: 17-69186
- GNIS feature ID: 2395865
- Website: www.shelbyvilleillinois.net

Shelbyville is a city in and the county seat of Shelby County, Illinois, United States, along the Kaskaskia River. As of the 2020 census, the population was at 4,674. HSHS Good Shepherd Hospital, located in town, is the county's only hospital. Shelbyville is also home to Chautauqua Auditorium.

== History ==
Shelbyville was founded in 1827 and named in honor of Isaac Shelby, hero of the Revolutionary War and Governor of Kentucky. The history of Shelbyville begins with Barnett Bone, a Tennessean who, in 1835, built a log cabin along the Kaskaskia River. His cabin eventually became the county courthouse. The first businesses were blacksmith shops, a general store and stage coach stop, and a grist mill.

Shelbyville is the home of Josephine Garis Cochran who invented one of the first mechanical dishwashers ever built in 1886. It was exhibited at the 1893 Chicago Columbian Exposition, where it won "the highest award."

Another Shelbyville invention, the first commercial pick-up baler, was designed and developed by Raymore McDonald, as conceived and financed by Horace M. Tallman and his two sons, Leslie and Gentry. These balers were marketed for many years by the Ann Arbor Machine Company of Shelbyville. This concept of field processing of farm forages made a significant contribution to the efficiency and economy of harvesting in the world's agriculture. This basic field pick-up mechanism has been used in over 15 million balers. The American Society of Agricultural and Biological Engineers designated Shelbyville as an historical landmark of agricultural engineering, of which there are only 47 in the entire United States. Mr. Tallman's home has been restored and is on the National Register of Historic Places. Located on West Main Street, the Tallman home is currently part of the Shelby Inn.

== Geography ==
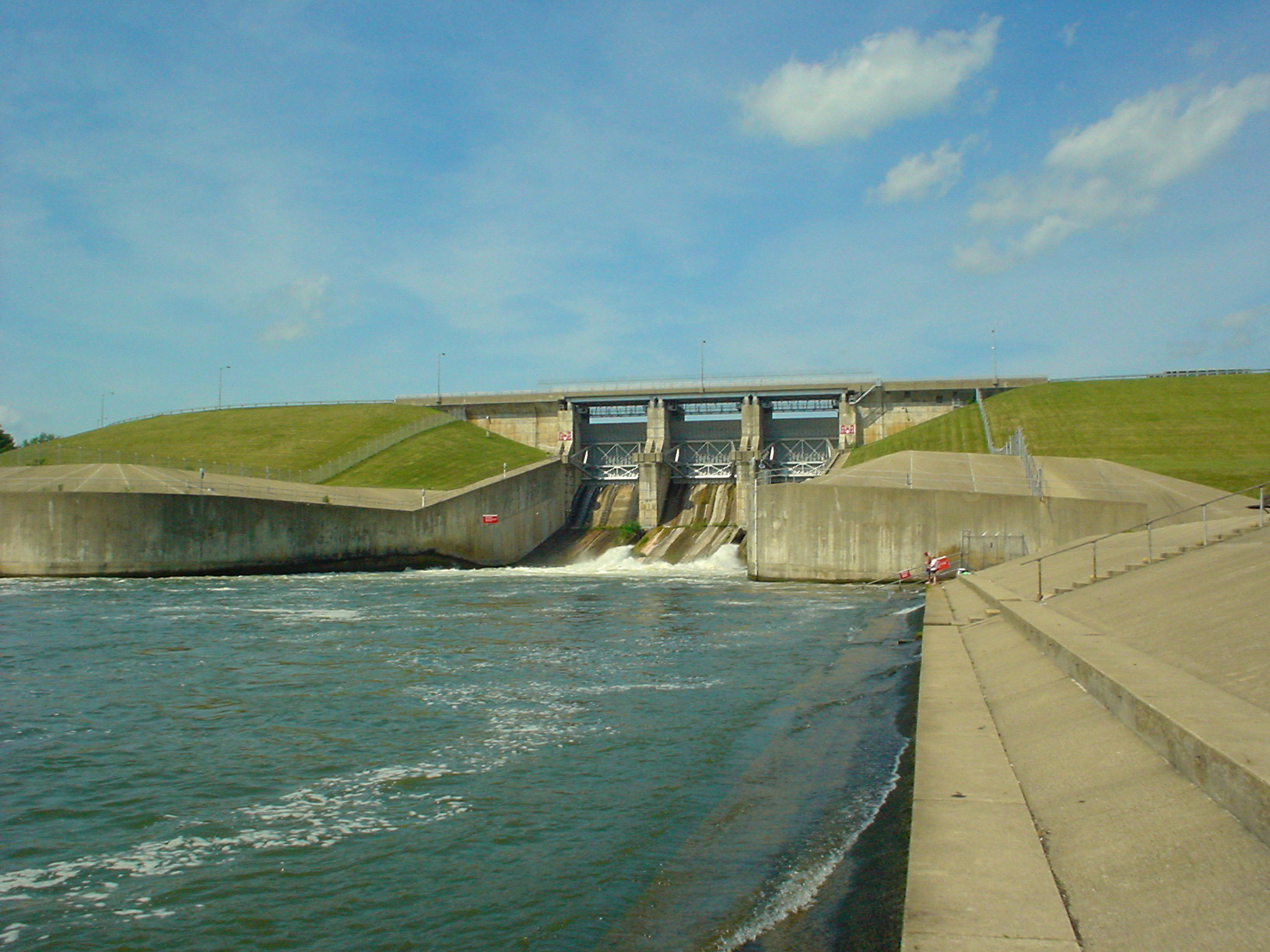
Lake Shelbyville Dam

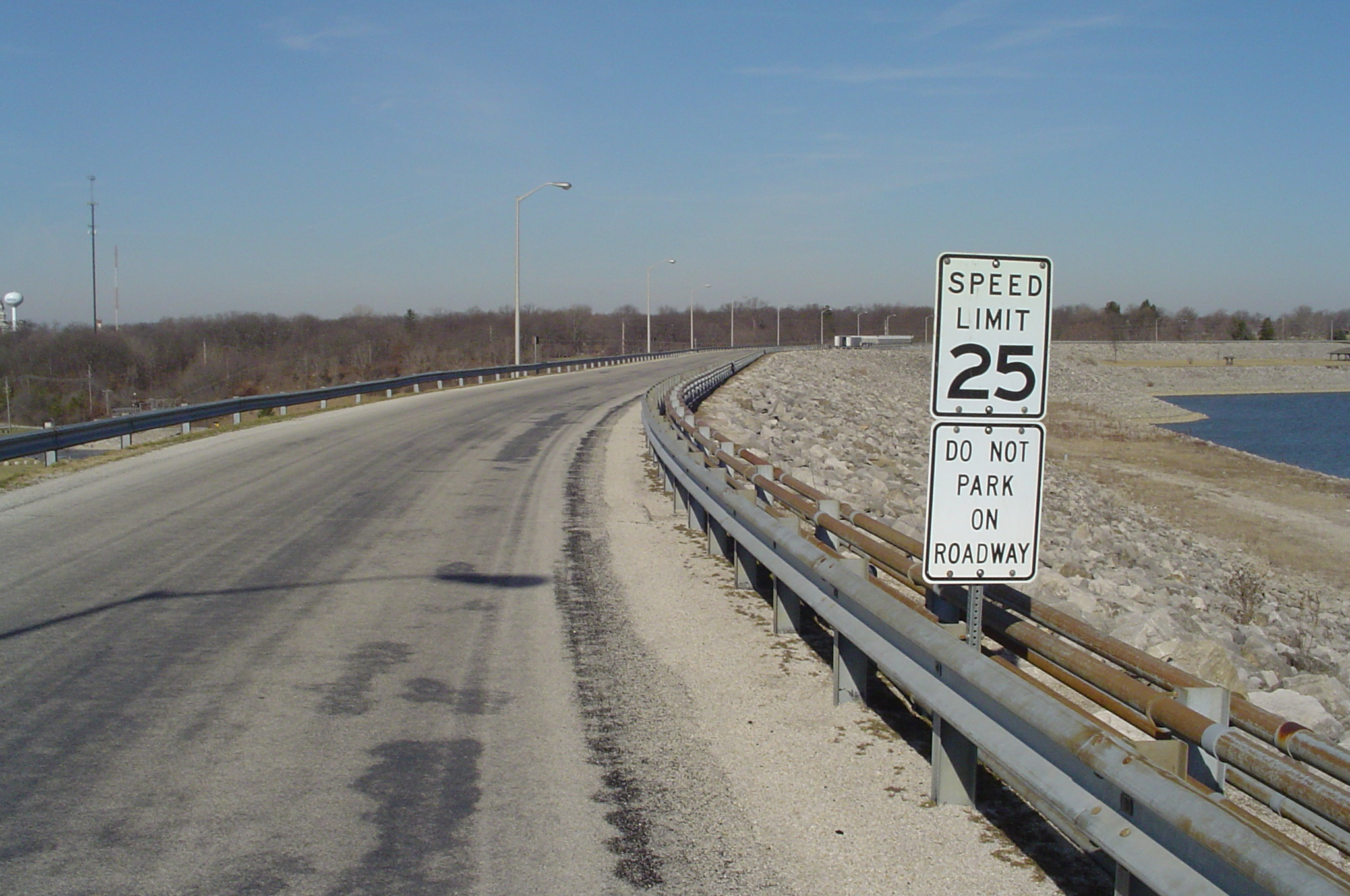
Dam Road, looking west

According to the 2010 census, Shelbyville has a total area of 4.016 square miles (10.40 km^{2}), of which 3.83 square miles (9.92 km^{2}), or 95.37%, is land and 0.186 square miles (0.48 km^{2}), or 4.63%, is water.

The terminal moraine of the Wisconsin Glacier is located near Shelbyville. This is referred to as the Shelbyville Moraine.

=== Lake Shelbyville Dam ===
The Kaskaskia River has been dammed where it breaches the Shelbyville Moraine, forming Lake Shelbyville.

The Army Corps of Engineers broke ground on the dam in 1963, and construction was completed in the early summer of 1970.

=== Climate ===
Climate data for Shelbyville, Illinois (1991–2020 normals, extremes 1973–present)
Month	Jan	Feb	Mar	Apr	May	Jun	Jul	Aug	Sep	Oct	Nov	Dec	Year
Record high °F (°C)	68 (20)	75 (24)	87 (31)	89 (32)	95 (35)	104 (40)	103 (39)	101 (38)	100 (38)	92 (33)	80 (27)	72 (22)	104 (40)
Mean daily maximum °F (°C)	35.9 (2.2)	41.1 (5.1)	51.9 (11.1)	64.0 (17.8)	73.7 (23.2)	82.5 (28.1)	86.0 (30.0)	84.9 (29.4)	79.6 (26.4)	67.1 (19.5)	52.3 (11.3)	40.6 (4.8)	63.3 (17.4)
Daily mean °F (°C)	27.6 (−2.4)	32.0 (0.0)	42.0 (5.6)	53.6 (12.0)	64.0 (17.8)	72.9 (22.7)	76.3 (24.6)	74.7 (23.7)	68.1 (20.1)	55.9 (13.3)	42.9 (6.1)	32.6 (0.3)	53.6 (12.0)
Mean daily minimum °F (°C)	19.2 (−7.1)	22.9 (−5.1)	32.1 (0.1)	43.1 (6.2)	54.3 (12.4)	63.4 (17.4)	66.6 (19.2)	64.6 (18.1)	56.6 (13.7)	44.8 (7.1)	33.5 (0.8)	24.7 (−4.1)	43.8 (6.6)
Record low °F (°C)	−21 (−29)	−18 (−28)	−3 (−19)	21 (−6)	30 (−1)	43 (6)	52 (11)	42 (6)	33 (1)	21 (−6)	4 (−16)	−15 (−26)	−21 (−29)
Average precipitation inches (mm)	2.60 (66)	2.07 (53)	2.71 (69)	4.33 (110)	4.65 (118)	4.68 (119)	4.06 (103)	3.41 (87)	3.06 (78)	3.57 (91)	3.71 (94)	2.59 (66)	41.44 (1,053)
Average precipitation days (≥ 0.01 in)	8.1	7.6	9.3	10.3	12.8	10.3	8.6	7.9	7.4	9.1	8.4	8.3	108.1
Source: NOAA

== Demographics ==
Historical population
Census	Pop.	Note	%±
1850	385		—
1860	1,330		245.5%
1870	2,051		54.2%
1880	2,939		43.3%
1890	3,162		7.6%
1900	3,546		12.1%
1910	3,590		1.2%
1920	3,568		−0.6%
1930	3,491		−2.2%
1940	4,092		17.2%
1950	4,462		9.0%
1960	4,821		8.0%
1970	4,887		1.4%
1980	5,259		7.6%
1990	4,943		−6.0%
2000	4,971		0.6%
2010	4,700		−5.5%
2020	4,674		−0.6%
U.S. Decennial Census

=== 2020 census ===
As of the 2020 census, Shelbyville had a population of 4,674. The median age was 43.3 years. 21.4% of residents were under the age of 18 and 24.2% of residents were 65 years of age or older. For every 100 females there were 93.7 males, and for every 100 females age 18 and over there were 89.8 males age 18 and over.

97.0% of residents lived in urban areas, while 3.0% lived in rural areas.

There were 2,093 households in Shelbyville, of which 24.7% had children under the age of 18 living in them. Of all households, 38.6% were married-couple households, 22.0% were households with a male householder and no spouse or partner present, and 31.8% were households with a female householder and no spouse or partner present. About 39.1% of all households were made up of individuals and 19.9% had someone living alone who was 65 years of age or older.

There were 2,345 housing units, of which 10.7% were vacant. The homeowner vacancy rate was 3.6% and the rental vacancy rate was 5.9%.

Racial composition as of the 2020 census
Race	Number	Percent
White	4,426	94.7%
Black or African American	15	0.3%
American Indian and Alaska Native	10	0.2%
Asian	31	0.7%
Native Hawaiian and Other Pacific Islander	0	0.0%
Some other race	40	0.9%
Two or more races	152	3.3%
Hispanic or Latino (of any race)	88	1.9%

=== 2010 census ===
As of the 2010 census, there were 4,700 people, 2,093 households, and 1,345(?) families residing in the city. The population density was 1,205.13 inhabitants per square mile (465.30/km^{2}). There were 2,308 housing units at an average density of 619.9(?) per square mile (239.1/km^{2})(?). The racial makeup of the city was 98.26% White, 0.34% African American, 0.26% Native American, 0.32% Asian, 0.06% Pacific Islander, 0.28% from other races, and 0.49% from two or more races. Hispanic or Latino of any race were 1.34% of the population.

There were 2,093 households, out of which 27.6% had children under the age of 18 living with them, 49.6% were married couples living together, 9.6% had a female householder with no husband present, and 36.9% were non-families. 33.1% of all households were made up of individuals, and 16.9% had someone living alone who was 65 years of age or older. The average household size was 2.28 and the average family size was 2.89.

In the city, the population was spread out, with 23.0% under the age of 18, 8.3% from 18 to 24, 25.3% from 25 to 44, 21.5% from 45 to 64, and 21.9% who were 65 years of age or older. The median age was 40 years. For every 100 females, there were 91.2 males. For every 100 females age 18 and over, there were 87.6 males.

The median income for a household in the city was $32,458, and the median income for a family was $39,205. Males had a median income of $31,477 versus $18,710 for females. The per capita income for the city was $17,596. About 6.2% of families and 9.9% of the population were below the poverty line, including 10.2% of those under age 18 and 13.8% of those age 65 or over.

== Education ==
Shelbyville is home to Shelbyville Community Unit School District 4 which also includes Shelbyville High School and was once home to Sparks College, a business trade school founded in 1908 and closed in 2009.

== Notable people ==
A statue of Abraham Lincoln in front of the Shelbyville Courthouse

- George A. Bowman (1890–1957), Wisconsin State Assembly member
- Orval Caldwell (1895–1972), painter and one-time president of the Art Institute of Chicago
- Monte Cater (born 1949), former head coach of Shepherd Rams football team, West Virginia Sports Hall of Fame, born in Shelbyville
- George D. Chafee (1839–1927), Illinois state legislator and lawyer
- Josephine Cochran (1839–1913), invented and patented the dishwasher (1886)
- Augusta Cottlow (1878–1954), concert pianist
- Jesse Monroe Donaldson (1895–1970), served as Postmaster General of the United States (1947–1953)
- Howland J. Hamlin (1850–1909), served as Illinois Attorney General (1901–1905)
- Samuel Wheeler Moulton (1821–1905), Illinois politician, Congressman, considered the father of public education in Illinois, lived in Shelbyville (1849–1905)
- Robert Marshall Root (1863–1937), noted Midwestern tonalist and impressionist painter
- Anthony Thornton (1814–1904), state representative (1851–1852), Congressman (1865–1867) and Supreme Court of Illinois justice (1870–1873); debated Abraham Lincoln in Shelbyville (1856)
