= J. Warren Madden =

American judge

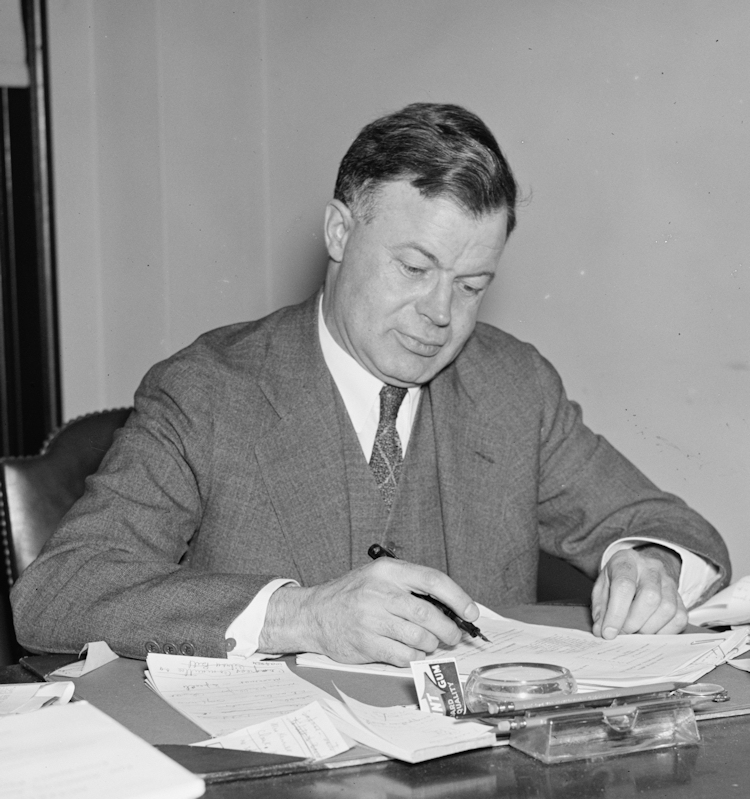
- J. Warren Madden at his desk at the NLRB, June 1937

Senior Judge of the United States Court of Claims
- In office August 15, 1961 – February 17, 1972

Judge of the United States Court of Claims
- In office January 7, 1941 – August 15, 1961
- Appointed by: Franklin D. Roosevelt
- Preceded by: William R. Green
- Succeeded by: Oscar Hirsh Davis

Chairman of the National Labor Relations Board
- In office August 27, 1935 – August 26, 1940
- Appointed by: Franklin D. Roosevelt
- Preceded by: Office established
- Succeeded by: Harry A. Millis

Personal details
- Born: Joseph Warren Madden; January 17, 1890 Damascus, Illinois, U.S.
- Died: February 17, 1972 (aged 82) San Francisco, California, U.S.
- Education: University of Illinois at Urbana–Champaign (A.B.); University of Chicago Law School (J.D.)

Joseph Warren Madden (January 17, 1890 – February 17, 1972) was an American lawyer, judge, civil servant, and educator. He served as a judge of the United States Court of Claims and was the first Chairman of the National Labor Relations Board (serving from August 27, 1935 to August 26, 1940). He received the Medal of Freedom in 1947.

== Education and career ==
Madden was born in the unincorporated town of Damascus in Waddams Township, Illinois, on January 17, 1890. His father was a somewhat wealthy farmer. He received his Bachelor of Arts degree from the University of Illinois at Urbana–Champaign, and his J.D. degree from the University of Chicago Law School in 1914. His legal specialties were domestic relations, property law, and torts, and he had no background in labor law.

Madden was a Professor of Law at the University of Oklahoma College of Law from 1914 to 1916. He was in private practice in Rockford, Illinois from 1916 to 1917. In 1917, he was appointed a Professor of Law at the Ohio State University Moritz College of Law. He was a visiting professor of law at the University of Chicago Law School, Stanford Law School, and Cornell Law School. He briefly served as a special assistant in the office of the United States Attorney General in Washington, D.C., in 1920. A rising star in legal education circles, he also served briefly as Dean of the West Virginia University College of Law before being added to the faculty of the University of Pittsburgh School of Law in 1927. During this time, he served on several federal commissions, including an arbitration panel which settled a strike by 1,800 streetcar conductors in Pittsburgh, Pennsylvania, in 1934. He also served on Pennsylvania Governor Gifford Pinchot's Commission on Special Planning in Industry, the Pittsburgh Regional Labor Board, and a West Virginia state commission which revised and codified that state's public statutes.

== NLRB service ==
In 1935, President Franklin D. Roosevelt named Madden the first Chairman of the newly formed National Labor Relations Board (NLRB). His name had appeared on a list developed by United States Senator Robert F. Wagner and United States Secretary of Labor Frances Perkins. Madden supported the expanded powers of the NLRB; he had observed the operations of the labor clauses of the previously existing National Industrial Relations Act, which were often stymied by employer refusal to negotiate with union representatives who didn't work for them. He was later to say of this period, "It was all very frustrating."

During his time on the NLRB, Madden was often opposed by the American Federation of Labor (AFL), which believed that Madden was using the National Labor Relations Act (NLRA; the primary federal law governing labor relations in the United States) and the procedures and staff of the NLRB to favor the AFL's primary competitor, the Congress of Industrial Organizations (CIO). The NLRB and NLRA were under intense pressure from employers, the press, Congressional Republicans, and conservative Democrats. From the time it was established in August 1935, management lawyers had challenged the constitutionality of the NLRA and the authority of the NLRB to act. The United States Department of Justice and NLRB legal staff wanted the Supreme Court to rule as quickly as possible on the constitutionality of the NLRA. But the Board and Justice Department also realized that the Court's Lochner era legal philosophy made it unlikely that the Court would uphold the Act. Subsequently, Madden strove to resolve minor cases before they could become court challenges, and worked to delay appeals as long as possible until the best possible case could be brought to the Court. The Supreme Court eventually upheld the NLRA in NLRB v. Jones & Laughlin Steel Corp., 301 U.S. 1 (1937), and Madden personally argued the case (along with NLRB General Counsel Charles Fahy and Charles Edward Wyzanski Jr., a special assistant in the office of the United States Solicitor General) before the Court. The ruling marked the Court's abandonment of Lochner era jurisprudence and led to a series of cases upholding New Deal legislation.

Madden continued to strategically guide the NLRB's legal efforts to strengthen the courts' view of the NLRA and the Board's actions. Through the efforts of Madden and NLRB General Counsel Charles H. Fahy, the Supreme Court reviewed only 27 cases between August 1935 and March 1941, even though the Board had processed nearly than 5,000 cases since its inception. The Supreme Court enforced the NLRB's rulings in 19 cases without modifying them, enforced them with modification in six more, and denied enforcement in two cases. Additionally, the Board won all 30 injunction and all 16 representation cases before the lower courts, a rate of success unequaled by any other federal agency.

=== AFL opposition ===
Madden's stewardship of the NLRB came under increasing attack, however. Section 9(b) of the NLRA authorized the Board to determine the appropriate bargaining unit, but did not specify what standards to use to make that determination. The AFL had long preferred craft unionism, whereby workers were organized into unions on the basis of craft, trade, or skill. But other unions sought to organize workers on an industry-wide basis (industrial unionism) to create more powerful unions as well as to take advantage of changes in the workplace that mass production and increases in corporate size were making. The intense philosophical differences led the AFL to eject those organizations advocating industrial unionism, and these unions formed the CIO in November 1936.

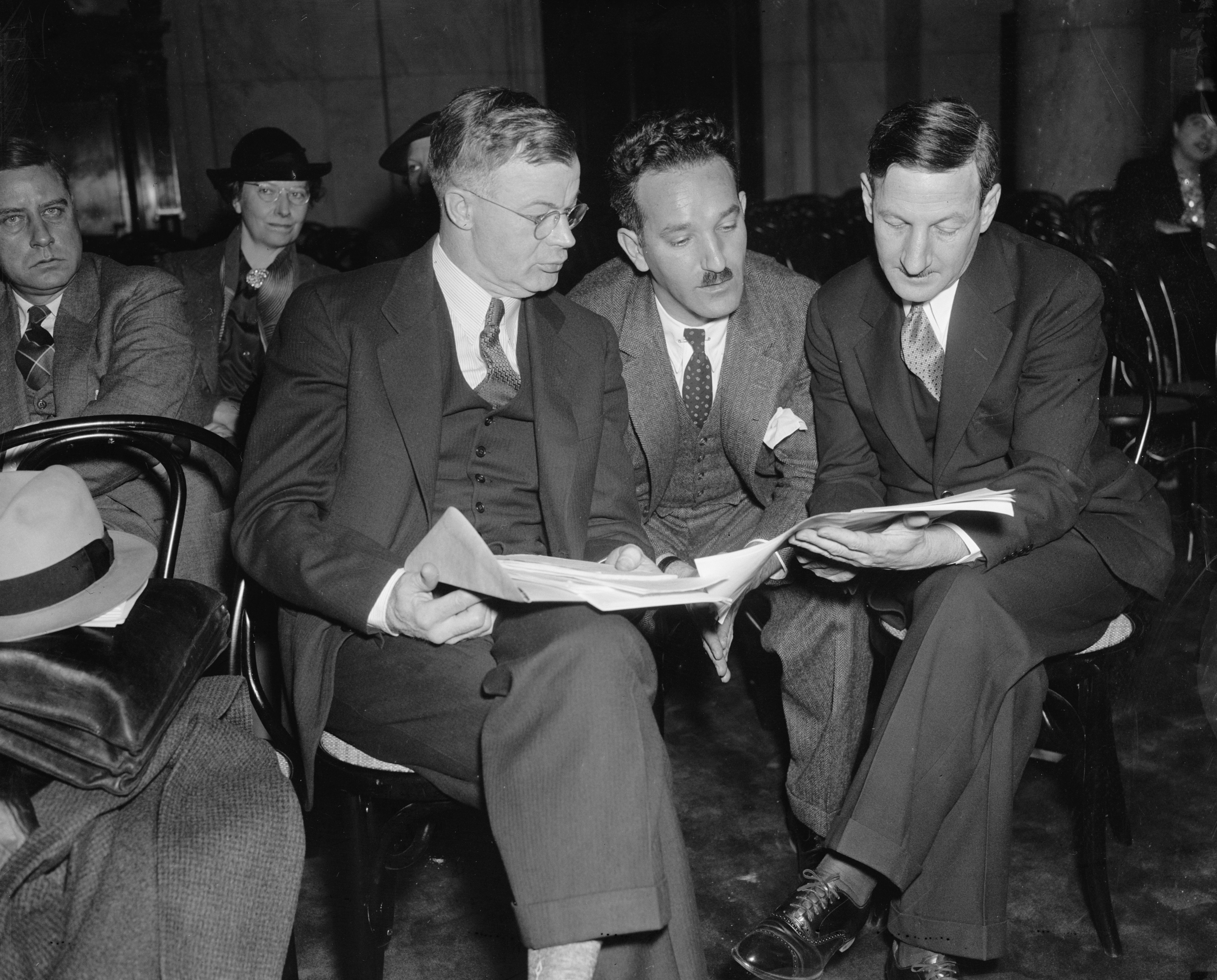
J. Warren Madden (left) goes over testimony with Charles Fahy (right) and Nathan Witt prior to a U.S. Senate Commerce Committee hearing on December 13, 1937.

AFL opposition to the "Madden Board" grew. Initially, the NLRB held in 1937 that workers themselves should determine whether they wished to be organized by craft or industry, a compromise acceptable to both the AFL and the CIO. But in 1939, the Board held in American Can Co., 13 NLRB 1252 (1939) that a unit's history of collective bargaining could overrule democratic self-determination. The decision deeply angered the AFL, which had sought to carve out three craft-based unions from the larger bargaining unit. The NLRB also upset the AFL when in 1938 it upheld an industry-wide bargaining unit that favored the CIO-affiliated International Longshore and Warehouse Union over the AFL-affiliated International Longshoremen's Association. The AFL, never a strong proponent of the NLRA, had proposed amending the law in early 1936. The "Madden Board's" actions led it to adopt a resolution in October 1937 condemning Madden's administration of the NLRB and the NLRA. It adopted another resolution in October 1938 charging the NLRB and Madden with perverting the law and harboring prejudice against craft unions.

In June 1938, the House Un-American Activities Committee (led by Chairman Martin Dies, Jr.) heard testimony from AFL leader John P. Frey, who accused Madden of staffing the NLRB with communists. The allegations were true, in at least one case: Nathan Witt, the NLRB's executive secretary and the man to whom Madden had delegated most administrative functions, was a member of the Communist Party of the United States. Witt had extensive influence among the staff, was close to Board Member Edwin S. Smith, and had influenced procedural matters on the Board in favor of the CIO in at least a few instances. Secretary Perkins prevailed upon President Roosevelt to speak with Madden, and the President demanded an impartial administration of the law.

When Member Donald Wakefield Smith's term on the Board expired, Roosevelt put William Morris Leiserson (Chairman of the National Mediation Board and a conservative Democrat) on the NLRB in his place on July 1, 1939. Leiserson forced Madden to appoint a personnel director and a trial examiner to reduce Witt's power, and unsuccessfully sought Witt's dismissal and a significant reduction in the Board's legal staff. Over the next six months, Madden abandoned his formerly expansive interpretation of the NLRA and began switching back and forth between the liberal position represented by Member Edwin S. Smith and the conservative position advocated by William M. Leiserson.

=== The Smith Committee ===
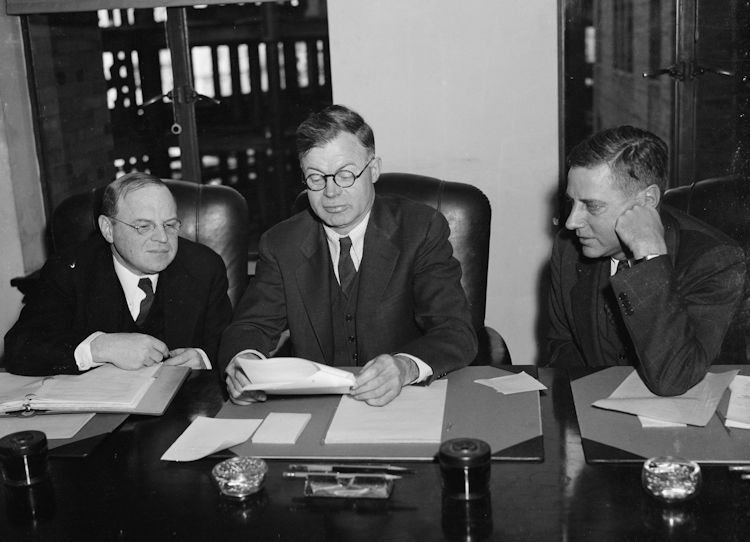
NLRB Member William M. Leiserson (left), J. Warren Madden, and NLRB Member Edwin S. Smith (right) during testimony before the Smith Committee on December 22, 1939.

On July 20, 1939, Republicans and conservative Democrats formed a coalition to push through the House of Representatives a resolution establishing a Special Committee to Investigate the National Labor Relations Board (the "Smith Committee"), chaired by conservative, anti-labor Rep. Howard W. Smith of Virginia. In testimony before the Smith Committee in December 1939, Leiserson strongly attacked Madden's administration of the NLRB.

On March 7, 1940, the Smith Committee proposed legislation which would have abolished the NLRB, reconstituted it, and radically amended the NLRA. Leiserson came out in favor of the changes, and accused Madden of administrative incompetence. President Roosevelt opposed the bill, although he conceded that perhaps the Board's membership should be expanded to five from three.

On March 21, the press reported that a study by four NLRB regional directors highly critical of Madden's administration of the Board had been suppressed (an action Madden vehemently denied).

The Smith bill won several early tests in the House, which also voted to substantially cut the NLRB's budget. Smith won a snap vote in the House Rules Committee permitting him to bring his bill directly to the floor for a vote and bypass the committee process (where Roosevelt and his House allies had intended to bottle up the bill). In an attempt to defuse the legislative crisis, Madden fired 53 staff and forced another five to resign, and decentralized the NLRB's trial process to give regional directors and field agents more authority. But the House easily passed the Smith bill by a vote of 258 to 129 on June 7, 1940. To protect the NLRB, Roosevelt convinced Senator Elbert D. Thomas, Chairman of the Senate Committee on Education and Labor, to hold no hearings or votes on the bill, and the legislation died.

The Smith Committee investigation had a lasting effect on labor law in the United States, and the Smith bill was the basis for the Taft-Hartley Act of 1947.

== Federal judicial service ==
Madden was nominated by President Franklin D. Roosevelt on November 15, 1940, to a seat on the Court of Claims (United States Court of Claims from June 25, 1948) vacated by Judge William R. Green. He was confirmed by the United States Senate on January 2, 1941, and received his commission on January 7, 1941. Madden was initially appointed as a Judge under Article I, but the court was raised to Article III status by operation of law on July 28, 1953, and Madden thereafter served as an Article III Judge. He assumed senior status on August 15, 1961. His service terminated on February 17, 1972, due to his death.

=== Nomination battle ===
Roosevelt had briefly considered Madden for the seat being vacated by Francis Biddle on the United States Court of Appeals for the Third Circuit (Biddle was being nominated to be United States Attorney General). But Roosevelt's confidantes were urging the president to "dump Madden" as a political liability and because the previous year's opposition had made Madden's reappointment a political impossibility. Madden entered political limbo: His five-year term as an NLRB Member expired on August 27, 1940, but Roosevelt did not reappoint him or anyone else to the position. On October 9, 1940, Secretary of Labor Perkins announced Madden would go to Canada to study that country's problems in boosting defense production. Finally, on November 15, 1940, President Roosevelt nominated Harry A. Millis to the post of Chairman of the NLRB, and nominated Madden to a seat on the United States Court of Claims.

Although the United States Senate Committee on the Judiciary favorably reported Madden's nomination to the floor (almost without discussion or comment), Republican Senators Robert A. Taft and Arthur H. Vandenberg, along with other Republicans, attempted to hold up the nomination on procedural grounds as a means of expressing their anger at what they believed was Madden's pro-labor administration of the National Labor Relations Act. Senator Taft intended to deny Madden's nomination a vote on the Senate floor, arguing that the Judiciary Committee had approved the nomination via telephone voice vote and telegram rather than at a face-to-face meeting. But Senator John E. Miller (Chairman of the Judiciary subcommittee which had approved the nomination in a face-to-face conference) and Senate Majority Leader Alben W. Barkley both defended the practice, noting it had been used many times before without question. Taft then attacked Madden for four hours on the Senate floor, declaring Madden had "no judicial temperament whatsoever" and that he had perpetrated a "gross perversion of justice" while head of the NLRB. After a struggle to obtain a quorum, the Senate was able to resolve itself for business and voted 36-to-14 to approve Madden's nomination to the bench.

Although J. Warren Madden had served on the NLRB for only five years, at least one observer concluded that Madden "chose to make a record of vigorous enforcement of the Act unmatched in the history of administrative agencies."

=== Wartime service ===
Madden was permitted to temporarily leave the bench in 1945 to assist the United States Department of War and the United States Army in various legal capacities associated with the Allied administration of occupied Germany in the wake of World War II. He was appointed Associate Director of the legal staff of the Office of Military Government, United States in 1946, and for his service received the Medal of Freedom in 1947. Madden was part of a three-person panel which reviewed Alfried Krupp's appeal of his conviction for crimes against humanity at the Subsequent Nuremberg Trials; Madden and his colleagues successfully recommended against overturning Krupp's conviction. He also was part of a team which traveled with Generals Dwight Eisenhower and Lucius D. Clay to the Potsdam Conference to provide legal assistance.

=== Later legal career ===
Madden returned to the bench after his service in Europe. Among his more notable opinions were a 1956 decision in which he held that The Jockey Club was not exempt from taxation because it was a "business league." Madden was often designated to sit on various United States courts of appeals when workload or vacancies threatened to impede an appellate court's function or his expertise was required. In 1958, sitting on an appellate court, Madden wrote an opinion which held that United States courts had no jurisdiction over claims by American banks that they had lost money in the Russian Revolution of 1917.

== Later service and death ==
Madden and his wife, Margaret L. Madden, lived in San Francisco, California, where he taught at the University of California, Hastings College of the Law. Madden died in his sleep of natural causes on February 17, 1972, in San Francisco. He was survived by his wife and four children.

== Sources ==
- "Madden, Joseph Warren - Federal Judicial Center". www.fjc.gov.

Political offices
Preceded by Office established	Chairman of the National Labor Relations Board; 1935–1940	Succeeded by Harry A. Millis
Legal offices
Preceded by William R. Green	Judge of the United States Court of Claims; 1941–1961	Succeeded by Oscar Hirsh Davis
