= Homer F. Aspinwall =

American politician

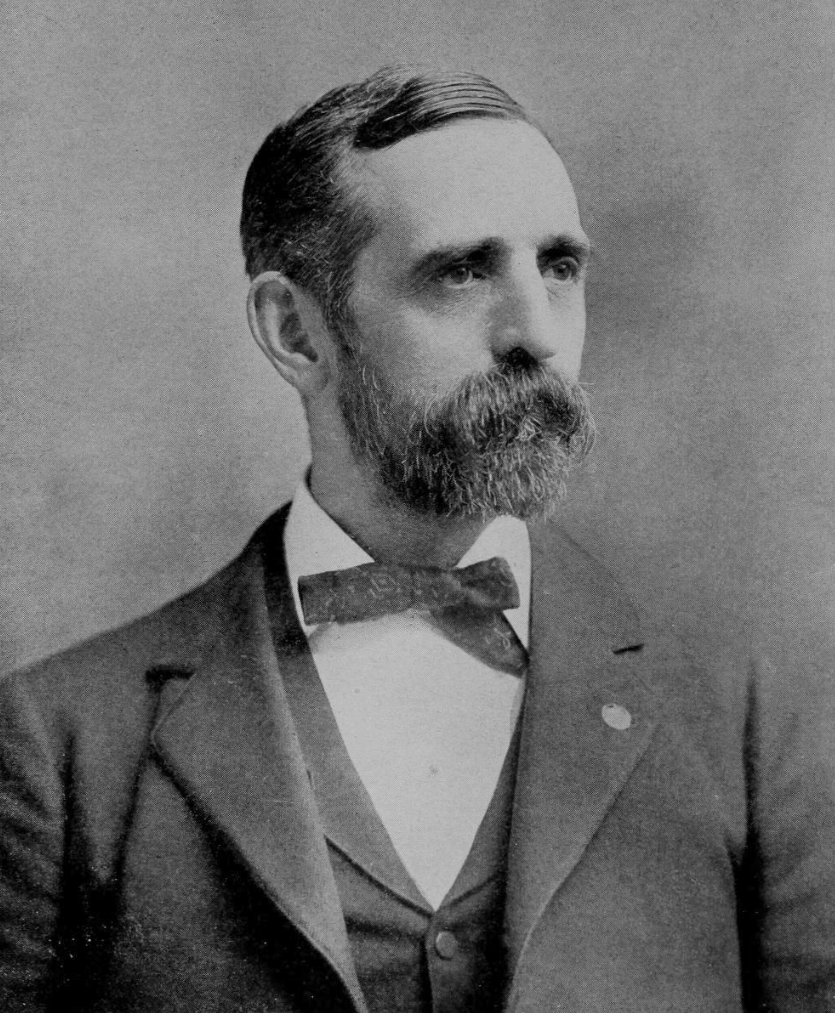

Member of the Illinois Senate from the 12th district
- In office 1892 – 1900
- Preceded by: Robert H. Wiles
- Succeeded by: John C. McKenzie

Personal details
- Born: November 15, 1846 Stephenson County, Illinois
- Died: February 23, 1919 (aged 72) Freeport, Illinois
- Party: Republican
- Spouse: Emma M. Sheetz (m. 1874)
- Children: 2
- Profession: Farmer, Senator
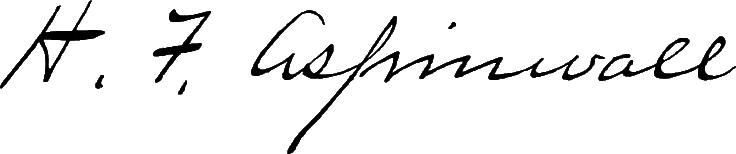
- Signature

Homer Franklin Aspinwall (November 15, 1846 – February 23, 1919) was an American politician, farmer, and wartime sea captain. Aspinwall was born in Stephenson County, Illinois, where he spent most of his professional life farming. The success of his farm led to his election as a county supervisor, and then to the Illinois Senate. He served eight years, during which the outbreak of the Spanish–American War led to his appointment as captain of a transport ship.

== Biography ==
=== Early life ===
Homer Aspinwall was born to John Aspinwall (1807-1889) and Lucy Shumway (1813-1883) in Stephenson County, Illinois 7 miles (11 km) west of Freeport on November 15, 1846. His father had suffered "His parents being in poor circumstances, he was compelled to earn his own living at the early age of seven years."

He attended public school and Freeport High School while helping on the family farm, then worked as a clerk in a wholesaling store, returning to the family farm again after two years of clerking. Florence Township.

Aspinwall married Emma M. Sheetz on December 18, 1874. They had a son, John Ray, and a daughter, Grace.

=== Career ===
An advocate of modern farming machinery, Aspinwall successfully developed his farm and became a prominent local citizen.

Aspinwall was elected tax assessor for Florence Town and held a variety of other minor offices there. He later elected to the county board of supervisors, where he served a four-year term. Aspinwall was a delegate to the 1880 Republican National Convention, supporting former President Ulysses S. Grant. In 1892, Aspinwall was elected to the Illinois Senate as a Republican. He served two four-year terms in the legislature. In 1896, Aspinwall campaigned for William McKinley.

At the outbreak of the Spanish–American War in 1898, Asprinwall helped to raise a regiment and offered to serve as lieutenant colonel. However, the unit was not deployed, and instead, McKinley appointed Aspwinwall a captain and assistant quartermaster. He was tasked with overseeing the SS Manitoba transport ship, formerly of the Atlantic Transport Line. The ship transferred 12,000 servicemen over the course of the conflict. With the war over, Aspinwall was mustered out in February 1899, returning to his final Senate term.

=== Legacy ===
Homer Aspinwall served for two years as president of the Northern Illinois Agricultural Association. A Methodist, Asprinwall was the secretary of the Freeport Methodist Camp-Meeting Association. He was active in Freemasonry and was a member of the Modern Woodmen of America.

Aspinwall died in Freeport on February 23, 1919, and was buried there in Oakland Cemetery.

== Sources ==
- Cave-Browne, Rev. J. (1895). "Knights of the Shire of Kent from AD 1275 TO AD 1831". Archaeologia Cantiana. 21: 198–243.
- The Aspinwall genealogy, by Algernon Aikin Aspinwall; Rutland; Vt., USA; 1845-1923.
