= Dakota Township =

Dakota Township may refer to the following townships in the United States:

- Dakota Township, Stephenson County, Illinois
- Dakota Township, Adams County, North Dakota
