= Buckhorn Corners, Illinois =

- Unincorporated community
- Location within Illinois Location within the United States
- Coordinates: 42°25′29″N 89°38′18″W
- Country: United States
- State: Illinois
- County: Stephenson
- Elevation: 919 ft (280 m)
- Time zone: UTC-6 (Central (CST))
  - Summer (DST): UTC-5 (CDT)
- Area codes: 815 & 779
- GNIS feature ID: 422511

Buckhorn Corners is an unincorporated community in Buckeye Township, Stephenson County, Illinois, United States. It is based at the intersection of McConnell Road and State Highway 26. Buckhorn Corners is in the Orangeville Community School District.
