= John H. Addams Homestead =

- U.S. National Register of Historic Places
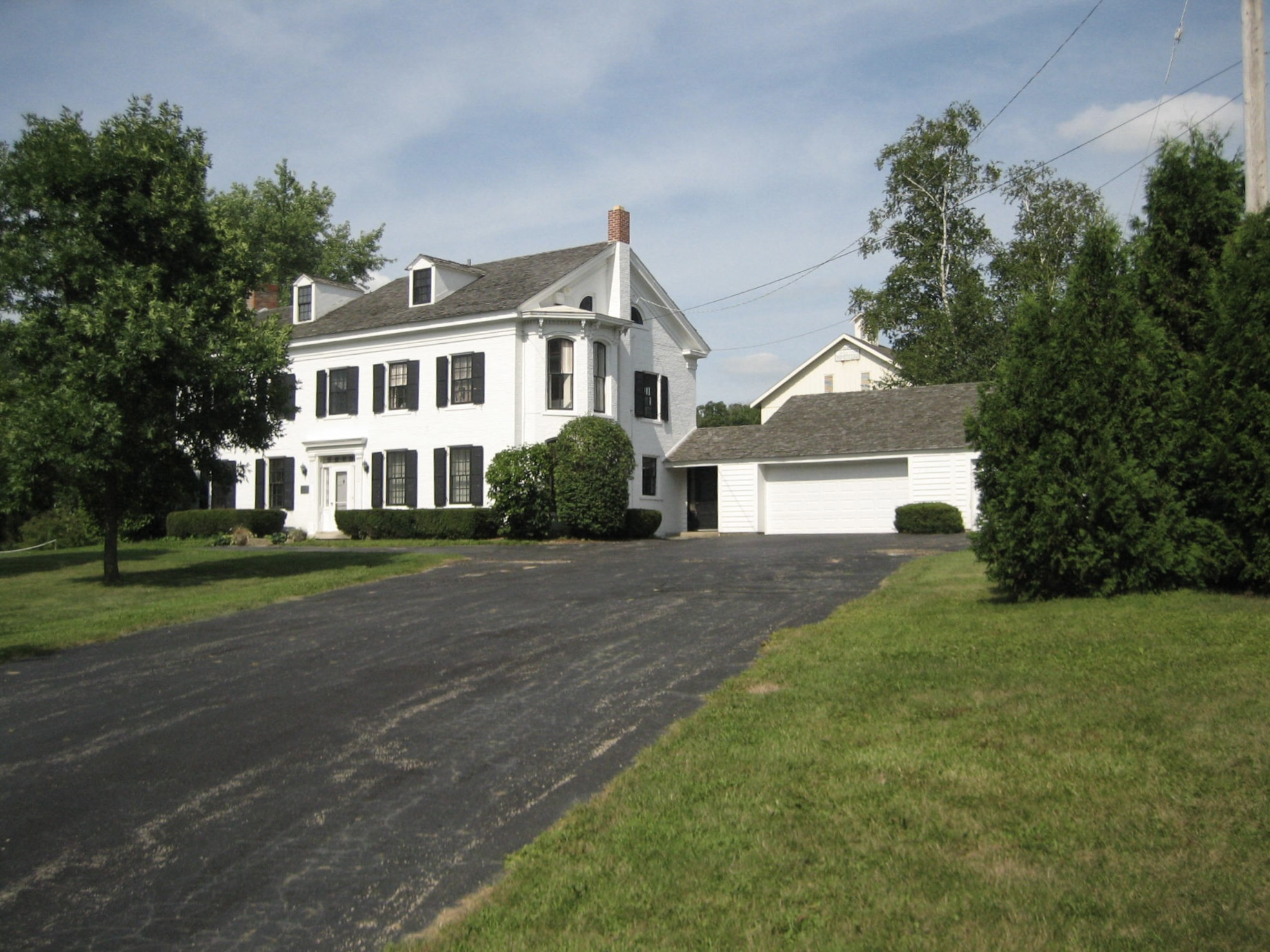

- Location within Illinois Location within the United States
- Location: 425 N. Mill St., Cedarville, Illinois
- Coordinates: 42°22′39″N 89°38′14″W
- Area: 5.5 acres (2.2 ha)
- Built: 1846; 1854
- Architect: John H. Addams (builder)
- Architectural style: Federal style
- NRHP reference No.: 79000871
- Added to NRHP: April 17, 1979

The John H. Addams Homestead, also known as the Jane Addams Birthplace, is located in the Stephenson County village of Cedarville, Illinois, United States. The homestead property, a 5.5-acre (22,000 m^{2}) site, includes an 1840s era Federal style house, a Pennsylvania-style barn, and the remains of John H. Addams' mill complex. The house was built in two portions, in 1846 and 1854 by Addams; he added some minor additions during the 1870s. Other major alterations took place during a 1950s modernization of the home. The homestead has been noted for its significance to industry and politics. On September 6, 1860, future Nobel Peace Prize recipient Jane Addams was born in the house.

== History ==
The 5.5-acre (22,000 m^{2}) John H. Addams Homestead includes the house, a Pennsylvania-style bank barn, and the remains of the Addams Grist Mill. After arriving in Stephenson County in 1845, Addams purchased the Cedar Creek Mills from Van Valzah, who had owned the mill since 1837. John H. Addams built the brick, federal-style house in two portions beginning in 1846. The smaller, northern part of the house was built in 1846, and in 1854 he added the larger southern portion of the house and its central entrance. Addams completed further alteration during the 1870s when he added a chimney and bay to the southern portion of the house, and a porch over the central front entrance.

In 1956, after the home was purchased by Thomas Ennenga, the front porch was removed and a gable-style dormer was placed into the roof as part of extensive modernizations done to the home. The rear porch was also replaced at that time.

== Architecture ==
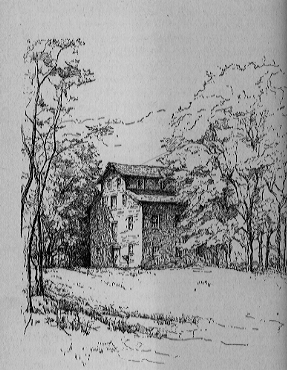
This 1910 sketch depicts the mill building, which is no longer extant.

The homestead also includes a Pennsylvania-style banked barn and the remains of Addams' mill. The barn is three and a half stories tall with dimensions of 60 feet (18 m) by 40 feet (12 m). It lies east of the house, and, like all banked barns, is built into a slope. The ramp leads into the south side of the barn, and the threshing floor; on the building's north side is a cantilevered forebay. Instead of windows the barn has louvered vents. The whole building rests upon a limestone foundation.

Most of Addams' grist mill has long since disappeared but there are some remains on the homestead site. Along Cedar Creek are the remains of the mill's limestone foundation, the dam, and the mill race. The mill pond has dried up and is now a grassy area. The original mill stood four stories tall.

== Significance ==
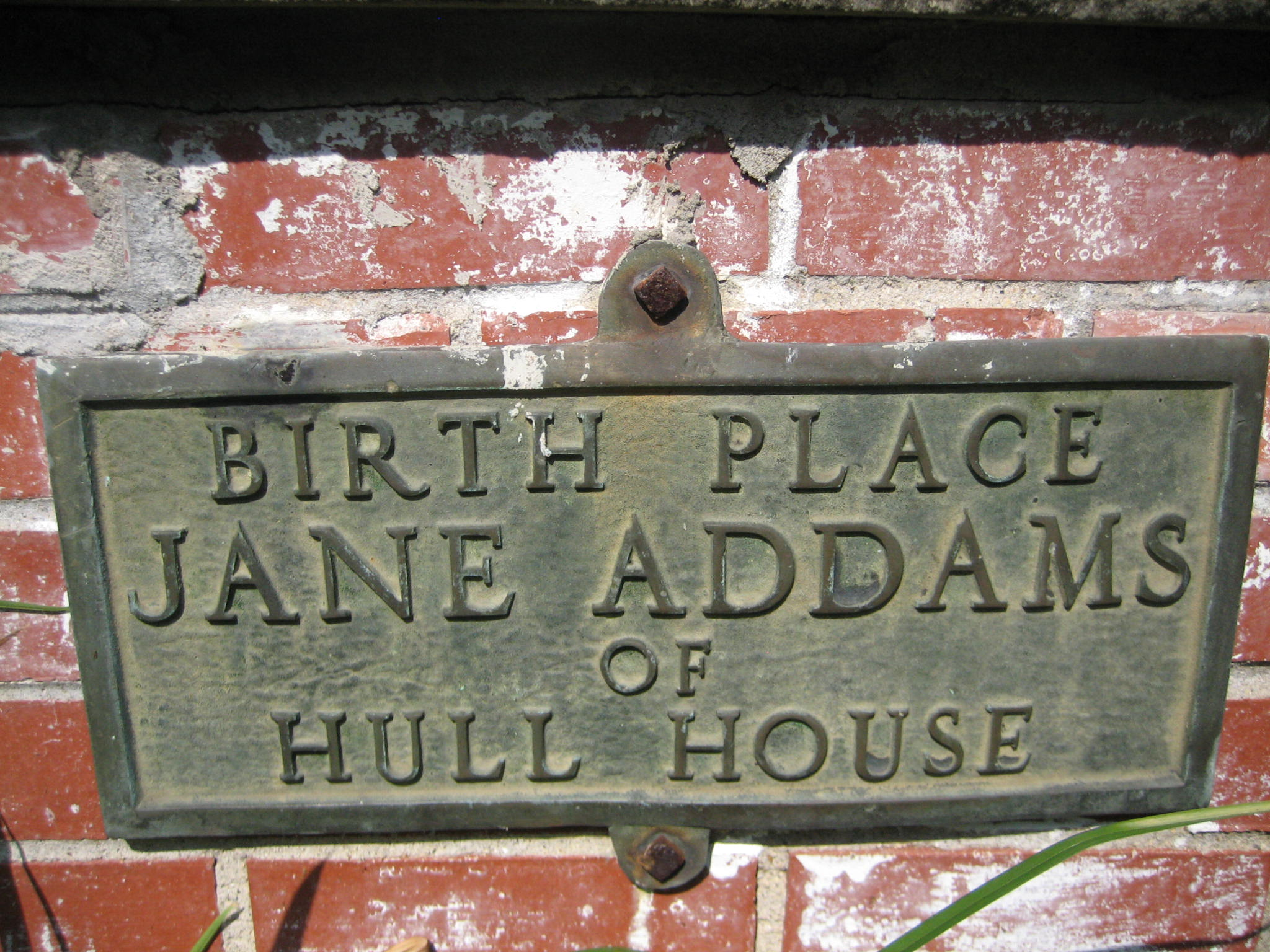
Part of the Addams Homestead's significance is derived from the fact that Jane Addams was born there.

John H. Addams was a prominent business leader and citizen in early Stephenson County. Besides his grist, saw and linseed mill, which became one of the largest in northern Illinois, Addams held positions in banks, railroad companies and was a founder of the Mutual Fire Insurance Company in 1867. He was active in politics much of his life and was a delegate to the state constitutional convention multiple times as well as serving an Illinois State Senator. His daughter, Nobel Peace Prize winner Jane Addams, was born in the house on September 6, 1860.

During the 1970s the Illinois Historic Sites Survey noted the house for its significance as Jane Addams' birthplace. The U.S. National Register of Historic Places noted the house for its significance to industry and politics/government, and added it to its listings on April 17, 1979.

== See also ==
- Hull House
- Jane Addams Burial Site
