= Cedarville, Illinois =

Cedarville
- Village
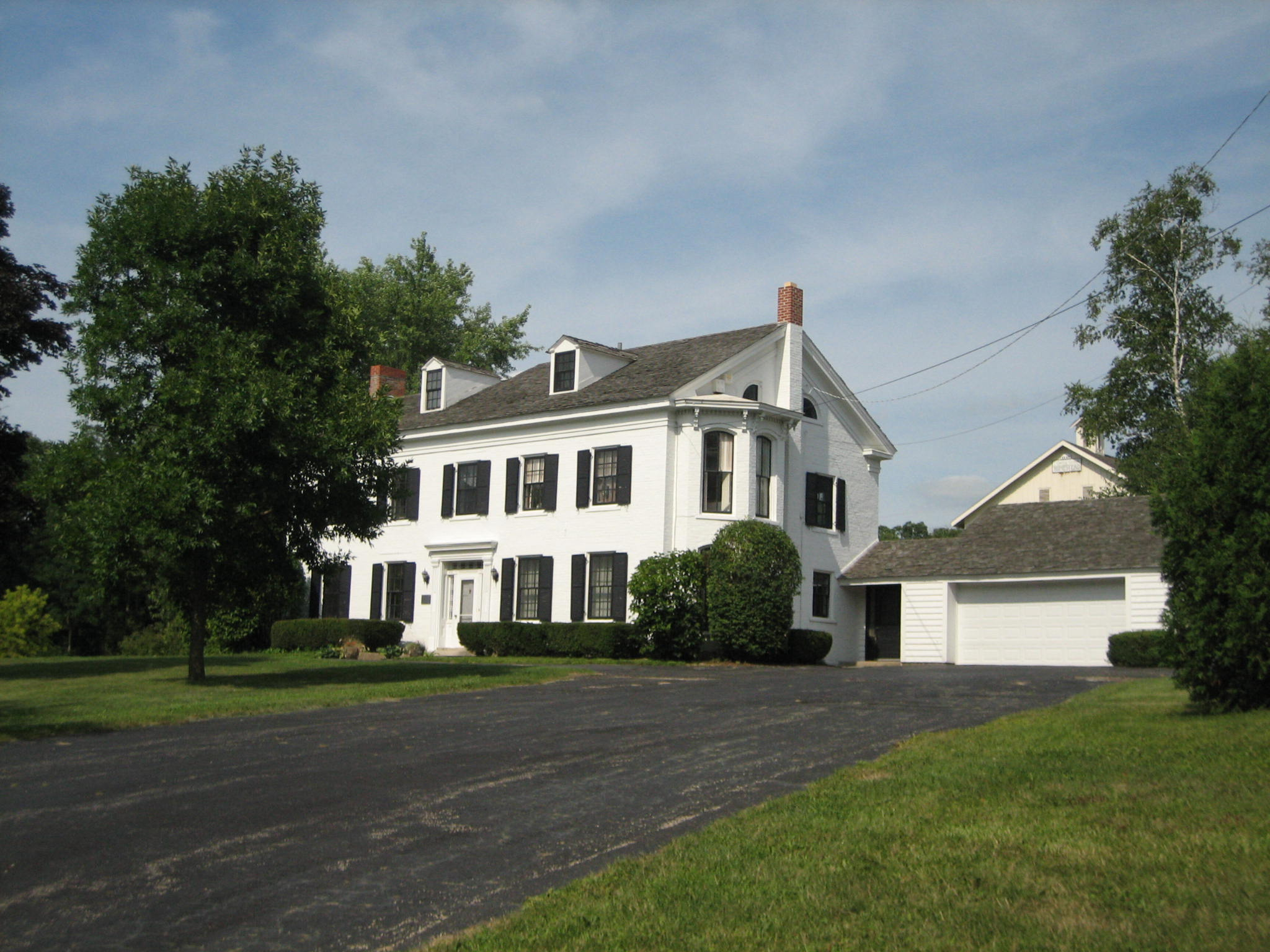
- John H. Addams Homestead, Birthplace of Jane Addams, Cedarville, Illinois.

- Location of Cedarville in Stephenson County, Illinois.
- Coordinates: 42°22′27″N 89°38′10″W
- Country: United States
- State: Illinois
- County: Stephenson
- Townships: Buckeye, Harlem, Lancaster

Area
  - Total: 0.46 sq mi (1.19 km^{2})
  - Land: 0.46 sq mi (1.19 km^{2})
  - Water: 0 sq mi (0.00 km^{2})
- Elevation: 846 ft (258 m)

Population (2020)
  - Total: 663
  - Density: 1,444.9/sq mi (557.86/km^{2})
- Time zone: UTC-6 (CST)
  - Summer (DST): UTC-5 (CDT)
- ZIP code: 61013
- Area code: 815
- FIPS code: 17-12008
- GNIS feature ID: 2397585

Cedarville is a village in Stephenson County, Illinois, United States. As of the 2020 census, Cedarville had a population of 663. It is the birthplace of social activist Jane Addams, the 1931 Nobel Peace Prize winner.

== Geography ==
According to the 2010 census, Cedarville has a total area of 0.45 square miles (1.17 km^{2}), all land.

== Demographics ==
Historical population
Census	Pop.	Note	%±
1890	326		—
1900	377		15.6%
1910	311		−17.5%
1920	258		−17.0%
1930	336		30.2%
1940	420		25.0%
1950	466		11.0%
1960	570		22.3%
1970	578		1.4%
1980	766		32.5%
1990	751		−2.0%
2000	719		−4.3%
2010	741		3.1%
2020	663		−10.5%
U.S. Decennial Census

As of the census of 2010, there were 741 people, 290 households, and 216 families residing in the village. The population density was 1,599.8 inhabitants per square mile (617.7/km^{2}). There were 313 housing units at an average density of 696.4 per square mile (268.9/km^{2}). The racial makeup of the village was 98.75% White, 0.14% Native American and 1.11% Asian. Hispanic or Latino of any race were 0.14% of the population.

There were 290 households, out of which 29.3% had children under the age of 18 living with them, 69.0% were married couples living together, 2.8% had a female householder with no husband present, and 25.5% were non-families. 21.0% of all households were made up of individuals, and 8.3% had someone living alone who was 65 years of age or older. The average household size was 2.48 and the average family size was 2.89.

In the village, the population was spread out, with 22.7% under the age of 18, 7.0% from 18 to 24, 30.9% from 25 to 44, 25.6% from 45 to 64, and 13.9% who were 65 years of age or older. The median age was 38 years. For every 100 females, there were 99.2 males. For every 100 females age 18 and over, there were 96.5 males.

The median income for a household in the village was $44,609, and the median income for a family was $49,821. Males had a median income of $37,500 versus $25,481 for females. The per capita income for the village was $20,076. Below the poverty line were 2.6% of people, 2.2% of families, 1.2% of those under 18 and 3.8% of those over 64.

== Education ==
It is in the Freeport School District 145. The district operates Freeport High School.

== See also ==
- Hull House
- Jane Addams
- Jane Addams Burial Site
- John H. Addams
- John H. Addams Homestead
