= Damascus, Illinois =

- Unincorporated community
- Location within Illinois Location within the United States
- Coordinates: 42°22′20″N 89°42′22″W
- Country: United States
- State: Illinois
- County: Stephenson
- Elevation: 764 ft (233 m)
- Time zone: UTC-6 (Central (CST))
  - Summer (DST): UTC-5 (CDT)
- Area codes: 815 & 779
- GNIS feature ID: 422602

Damascus is an unincorporated community in Harlem and Waddams townships, Stephenson County, Illinois. Damascus is located at the junction of County Routes 5 and 26, 3.75 miles (6.04 km) west of Cedarville.

== History ==
Damascus was laid out in 1837. A post office was established in 1854, and remained in operation until 1906.
