= Loran Township, Illinois =

Loran Township
- Township
- Location in Stephenson County
- Coordinates: 42°14′30″N 89°48′18″W
- Country: United States
- State: Illinois
- County: Stephenson

Government
  - Supervisor: Kenneth Musser

Area
  - Total: 35.06 sq mi (90.8 km^{2})
  - Land: 35.05 sq mi (90.8 km^{2})
  - Water: 0.01 sq mi (0.026 km^{2}) 0.03%
- Elevation: 810 ft (250 m)

Population (2010)
  - Estimate (2016): 1,385
  - Density: 41.1/sq mi (15.9/km^{2})
- Time zone: UTC-6 (CST)
  - Summer (DST): UTC-5 (CDT)
- FIPS code: 17-177-44758

Loran Township is located in Stephenson County, Illinois. As of the 2010 census, its population was 1,442 and it contained 575 housing units.

== Communities and landmarks ==
- Pearl City, an incorporated village
- Yellow Creek, an unincorporated village
- Mill Grove, a former community
- Sabin Cemetery

== Geography ==
Loran is Township 26 North, Range 6 East of the Fourth Principal Meridian.

According to the 2010 census, the township has a total area of 35.06 square miles (90.8 km^{2}), of which 35.05 square miles (90.8 km^{2}) (or 99.97%) is land and 0.01 square miles (0.026 km^{2}) (or 0.03%) is water.

== Demographics ==
Historical population
| Census | Pop. | Note | %± |
|---|---|---|---|
| 2016 (est.) | 1,385 |
U.S. Decennial Census
