= John H. Addams =

19th-century American state politician

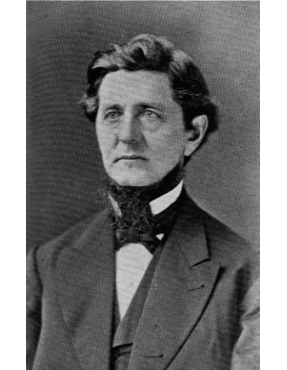

Member of the Illinois Senate
- In office 1854–1870

Personal details
- Born: John Huy Addams; July 12, 1822 Sinking Spring, Pennsylvania, U.S.
- Died: August 17, 1881(aged 59) Green Bay, Wisconsin, U.S.
- Resting place: Cedarville Cemetery, Cedarville, Illinois, U.S.
- Party: Republican
- Spouse(s): Sarah Weber; Anna H. Haldeman
- Children: 9, including Alice and Jane
- Occupation: Mill owner
- Profession: Businessman

John Huy Addams (July 12, 1822 – August 17, 1881) was a politician and businessman from the U.S. state of Illinois. Addams was born in Pennsylvania in 1822, where he married Sarah Weber (1817–1863). In 1844 the couple moved to Cedarville, Illinois, and he purchased the Cedar Creek Mill. Addams quickly became a successful businessman working as a director for two railroad companies and a bank president. He constructed a prominent Federal style home in 1854 which still stands today. He and his wife Sarah (Weber) Addams had nine children, including Alice Haldeman and social activist Jane Addams.

Addams became active in state politics and eventually served as an eight-term Illinois State Senator, from 1854 to 1870. In 1863, his wife, Sarah, died and he was remarried in 1868 to Anna Haldeman, herself a widow. He was a key influence on his daughter Jane and part of the reason she focused so much attention on social causes. He died in Green Bay, Wisconsin, while on a family vacation in 1881.

== Early life ==
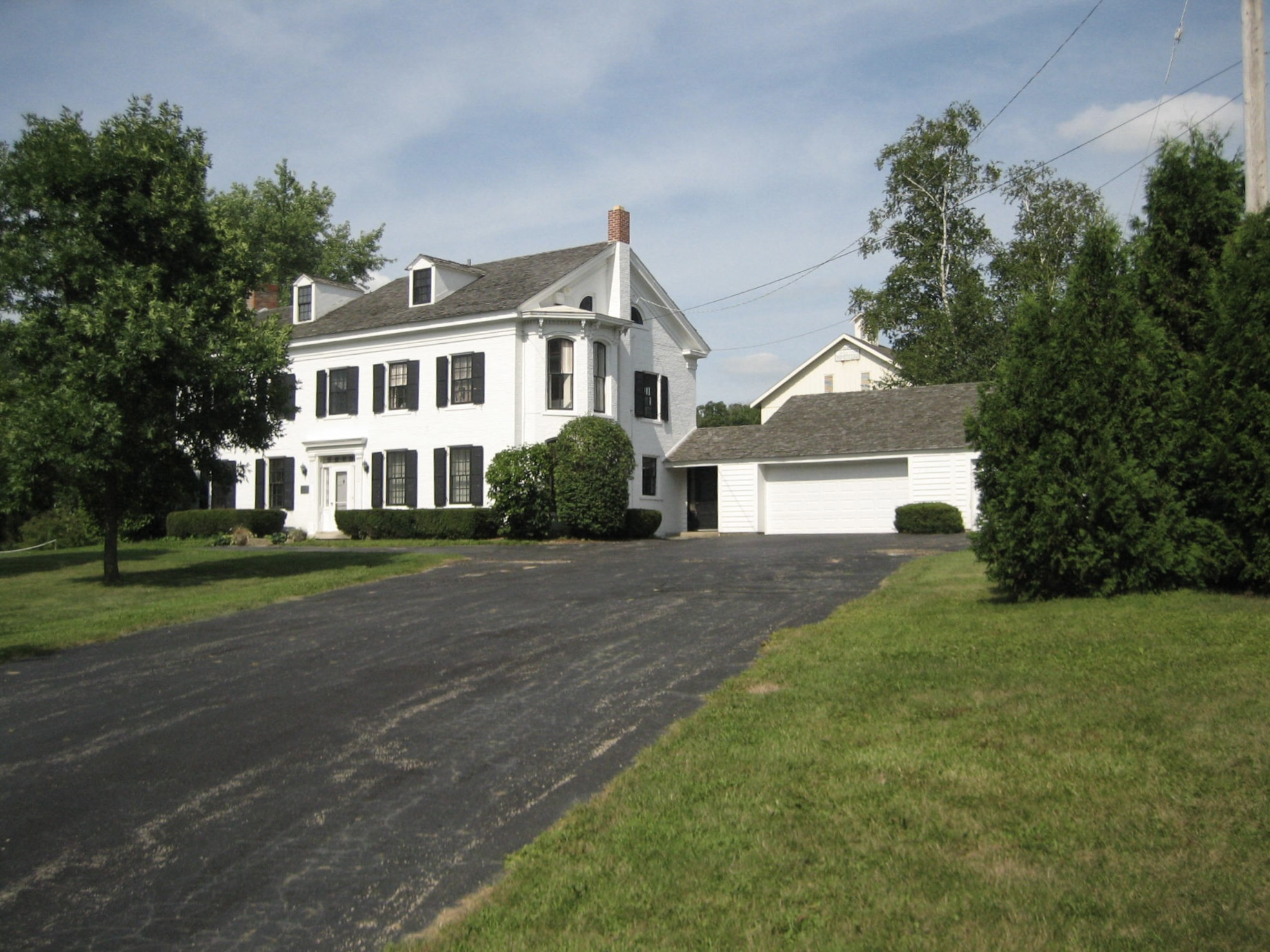
Social activist Jane Addams was born in the house at John Addams' Homestead in 1860.

John Huy Addams was born in Sinking Spring, Pennsylvania, in on July 12, 1822. He married Sarah Weber, five years his elder, while still living in Kreidersville, Pennsylvania. Both families, Addams and Weber, were from old Pennsylvanian lineage; Addams' ancestors had been granted land by William Penn in the 17th century. In 1844 Addams, then 22, and his new bride arrived in Cedarville, Illinois, near the Illinois-Wisconsin state border in Stephenson County.

Addams established himself quickly as a successful mill operator when he purchased the Cedar Creek Mill in 1844. When the couple first arrived in Stephenson County they lived in a small two-room home with a loft. In 1854 Addams completed construction on an addition which made the Addams' home a much larger, prominent Federal style house. Though the couple had nine children, only four survived to adulthood; their eighth child was Nobel Peace Prize recipient Jane Addams, born at the Addams House in Cedarville on September 6, 1860.

In January 1863 Sarah Addams, then pregnant with her ninth child, went to assist in the delivery of a baby for the wagon-maker's wife. During the birth, she collapsed and was carried home. Sarah's own baby was delivered prematurely and as a result, stillborn. Sarah died a week later; Jane was just 2 years and 4 months old at the time of her mother's death. Jane Addams was cared for mostly by her older sisters after 1863.

== Career ==
=== Business ===
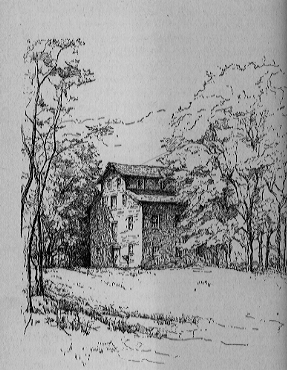
A 1910 depiction of Addams' successful Cedar Creek Mill

Addams' milling business became one of the largest operations in northern Illinois, comprising a saw mill, linseed mill, and grist mill along Cedar Creek on the Addams' property. The mill also represented the start of Addams' successful business career. From 1864 until 1881 he was the president of the Second National Bank in Freeport, Illinois. Addams also served in directorships with the Galena and Chicago Union Railroad and the Illinois Central Railroad, he was also a founder of the Mutual Fire Insurance Company in 1867. Addams achieved a level of local fame due to his many successful business ventures and was regarded as Stephenson County's most successful entrepreneur.

=== Illinois State Senate and American Civil War ===
Addams served for sixteen years in the Illinois Senate, where he acquired a reputation for integrity; as one historian phrased it, "he became famous as a man who not only had never taken a bribe, but had never been offered one. He participated in the founding of the Republican Party and was a friend of Abraham Lincoln's.

During the Civil War, Addams helped to raise and equip a regiment that became known as "the Addams Guard."

=== Influence on Jane Addams ===
Jane Addams stated that her father, John, was a primary influence in her life. In her 1910 autobiography she described various ways in which she attempted to imitate her father, as well as establishing him as her primary influencer. She stated that her father was her reason for civic involvement and interest in the "moral concerns of life." It was Addams' deep civic involvement that had such a profound influence on his daughter, Jane. John Addams was active in the Cedarville School Board and a trustee of the Rockford Young Ladies' Seminary, later known as Rockford College, where Jane would earn her undergraduate degree. Besides his role in founding the state's Republican Party he was also one of the key individuals who helped bring the second Lincoln-Douglas Debate to Freeport.

== Late life and death ==
In 1867, four years after Sarah Addams' death, John H. Addams was remarried to Anna H. Haldeman. Haldeman was herself a widow who brought two additional children of her own into the family. One of her sons, George, would also have a strong influence on Jane Addams.

In early August 1881, Addams decided to take his family on a vacation in northwestern Michigan, where he planned to inspect some of the iron and copper ore mines as potential investments; they left on August 4. A week later John Addams became ill while climbing in an ore mine and the family decided to return home by train. They made it to Green Bay, Wisconsin, before Addams was too sick to travel any further and the family booked a hotel room. John H. Addams died suddenly of acute appendicitis on August 17, 1881, in the hotel in Green Bay at the age of 59. His death came as a shock to his daughter Jane, and she spent eight years in a state of (or in depression) depression after his death.

== See also ==
- Hull House
- Jane Addams Burial Site
- John H. Addams Homestead
