= Jefferson Township, Illinois =

Jefferson Township, Illinois may refer to two different townships:

- Jefferson Township, Cook County, Illinois, a defunct township in Cook County; or
- Jefferson Township, Stephenson County, Illinois

== See also ==
- Jefferson Township
