= Winneshiek, Illinois =

- Unincorporated community
- Location within Illinois Location within the United States
- Coordinates: 42°20′40″N 89°31′38″W
- Country: United States
- State: Illinois
- County: Stephenson
- Elevation: 830 ft (250 m)
- Time zone: UTC-6 (Central (CST))
  - Summer (DST): UTC-5 (CDT)
- Area codes: 815 & 779
- GNIS feature ID: 423325

Winneshiek is an unincorporated community in Lancaster Township, Stephenson County, Illinois. Winneshiek is 5.8 miles (9.3 km) northeast of Freeport.
