= Yellow Creek, Illinois =

- Unincorporated community
- Location within Illinois Location within the United States
- Coordinates: 42°18′20″N 89°51′23″W
- Country: United States
- State: Illinois
- County: Stephenson
- Elevation: 853 ft (260 m)
- Time zone: UTC-6 (Central (CST))
  - Summer (DST): UTC-5 (CDT)
- Zip: 61092
- Area codes: 815 & 779
- GNIS feature ID: 423855

Yellow Creek is an unincorporated community in Kent Township, Stephenson County, Illinois, United States. Yellow Creek is located on Yellow Creek and County Route 16, 3.2 miles (5.1 km) north-northwest of Pearl City.
