= Senator Aspinall =

Senator Aspinall may refer to:

- Joseph Aspinall (1854–1939), New York State Senate
- Wayne N. Aspinall (1896–1983), Colorado State Senate

== See also ==
- Homer F. Aspinwall (1846–1919), Illinois State Senate
