= Scioto Mills, Illinois =

- Unincorporated community
- Location within Illinois Location within the United States
- Coordinates: 42°21′23″N 89°40′07″W
- Country: United States
- State: Illinois
- County: Stephenson
- Elevation: 787 ft (240 m)
- Time zone: UTC-6 (Central (CST))
  - Summer (DST): UTC-5 (CDT)
- Zip code: 61076
- Area codes: 815 & 779
- GNIS feature ID: 418128

Scioto Mills is an unincorporated community in Stephenson County, Illinois. Scioto Mills is 2 miles (3.2 km) southwest of Cedarville.
