= Florence Township, Stephenson County, Illinois =

Florence Township
- Township
- Location in Stephenson County
- Coordinates: 42°14′34″N 89°41′03″W
- Country: United States
- State: Illinois
- County: Stephenson

Government
  - Supervisor: Lynn Heeren

Area
  - Total: 33.86 sq mi (87.7 km^{2})
  - Land: 33.84 sq mi (87.6 km^{2})
  - Water: 0.01 sq mi (0.026 km^{2}) 0.03%
- Elevation: 820 ft (250 m)

Population (2010)
  - Estimate (2016): 1,253
  - Density: 38.2/sq mi (14.7/km^{2})
- Time zone: UTC-6 (CST)
  - Summer (DST): UTC-5 (CDT)
- FIPS code: 17-177-26506

Florence Township is located in Stephenson County, Illinois. As of the 2010 census, its population was 1,293 and it contained 541 housing units. The unincorporated community of Florence is located in the township.

== Geography ==
Florence is Township 26 North, Range 7 East of the Fourth Principal Meridian.

According to the 2010 census, the township has a total area of 33.86 square miles (87.7 km^{2}), of which 33.84 square miles (87.6 km^{2}) (or 99.94%) is land and 0.01 square miles (0.026 km^{2}) (or 0.03%) is water.

== Demographics ==
Historical population
Census	Pop.	Note	%±
2016 (est.)	1,253
U.S. Decennial Census

== See also ==
- James Bruce Round Barn
