= Bolton, Illinois =

- Unincorporated community
- Location within Illinois Location within the United States
- Coordinates: 42°14′31″N 89°43′31″W
- Country: United States
- State: Illinois
- County: Stephenson
- Elevation: 810 ft (250 m)
- Time zone: UTC-6 (Central (CST))
  - Summer (DST): UTC-5 (CDT)
- Zip: 61009
- Area codes: 815 & 779
- GNIS feature ID: 422485

Bolton is an unincorporated community in Stephenson County, Illinois, United States.
