= Buena Vista, Illinois =

- Unincorporated community
- Location within Illinois Location within the United States
- Coordinates: 42°25′32″N 89°40′40″W
- Country: United States
- State: Illinois
- County: Stephenson
- Elevation: 801 ft (244 m)
- Time zone: UTC-6 (Central (CST))
  - Summer (DST): UTC-5 (CDT)
- Area codes: 815 & 779
- GNIS feature ID: 405152

Buena Vista is an unincorporated community located along Richland Creek in Stephenson County, Illinois. Buena Vista is in Orangeville Community School District. The Jane Addams bike trail passes through Buena Vista.
