= Rock Grove, Illinois =

- Unincorporated community
- Location within Illinois Location within the United States
- Coordinates: 42°27′47″N 89°30′43″W
- Country: United States
- State: Illinois
- County: Stephenson
- Elevation: 945 ft (288 m)
- Time zone: UTC-6 (Central (CST))
  - Summer (DST): UTC-5 (CDT)
- Area codes: 815 & 779
- GNIS feature ID: 416814

Rock Grove is an unincorporated community in Stephenson County, Illinois, 6.5 miles (10.5 km) east of Orangeville. It is in Dakota Community Unit School District 201.
