= Loran, Illinois =

- Unincorporated community
- Location within Illinois Location within the United States
- Coordinates: 42°14′06″N 89°54′37″W
- Country: United States
- State: Illinois
- County: Stephenson
- Elevation: 758 ft (231 m)
- Time zone: UTC-6 (Central (CST))
  - Summer (DST): UTC-5 (CDT)
- Area codes: 815 & 779
- GNIS feature ID: 412635

Loran is an unincorporated community in Stephenson County, Illinois, United States.
