= Jane Addams Burial Site =

Coordinates: 42.3838°N 89.6419°W

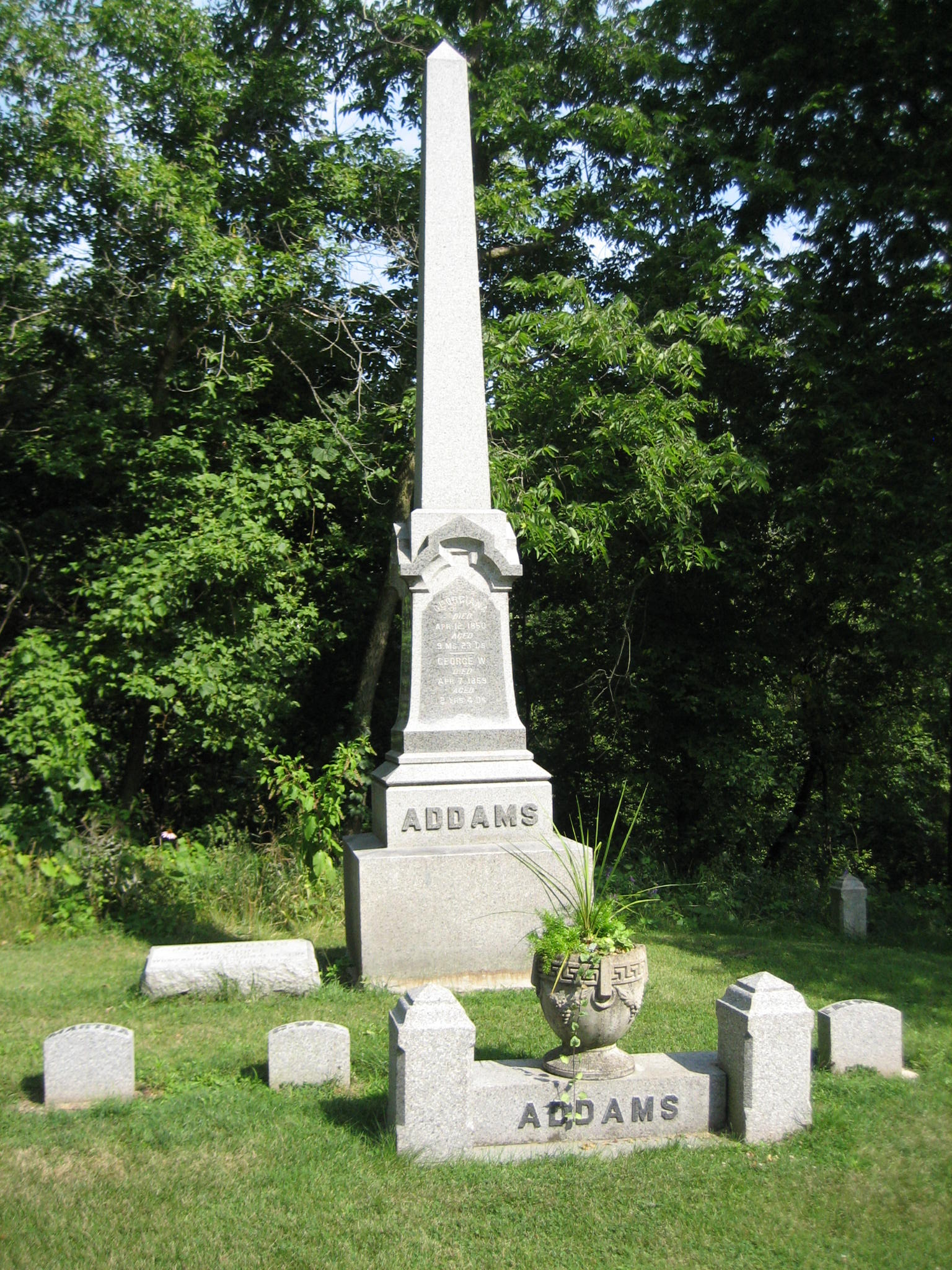
Jane Addams' Burial Site is marked with an obelisk which underwent a restoration in 2004. Her grave is the rectangular tombstone to the left of the obelisk.

The Jane Addams Burial Site is located in Cedarville Cemetery in the village of Cedarville, Illinois, United States. Jane Addams' burial site is located on a family plot which also contains the graves of her father, John Huy Addams, and several other family members. Addams, a social activist famous for her affiliation with Hull House, died of cancer in 1935. Her funeral was held on the courtyard of the Hull House and her body then transported for burial in Cedarville.

== Death ==
Jane Addams, a social activist famous for her affiliation with Hull House in Chicago, died of cancer on May 21, 1935. Her death sparked a public outpouring of grief, with some commentators comparing her to Abraham Lincoln. Telegrams arrived by the hundreds, offering condolences from all over the world, including Japan, India, and England. One famous eulogy from Walter Lippmann stated, "She had infinite sympathy for common things without forgetfulness for those that are uncommon." A cartoon in the Chicago Herald and Examiner summed up her accomplishments as "carved in imperishable granite".

== Burial ==
Before her death, the Episcopal Bishop of Washington, D.C. offered Addams burial in the National Cathedral, beside U.S. President Woodrow Wilson. Addams refused this offer and instead opted to be buried in the small family plot at the Cedarville Cemetery in her hometown of Cedarville, Illinois. Two days after her death, May 23, Addams' funeral was held in the courtyard of the Hull House; it was attended by thousands. Her body was transported by train to Freeport, Illinois where it was removed and taken to the Addams Homestead and then to Cedarville Cemetery for burial.

== Grave ==
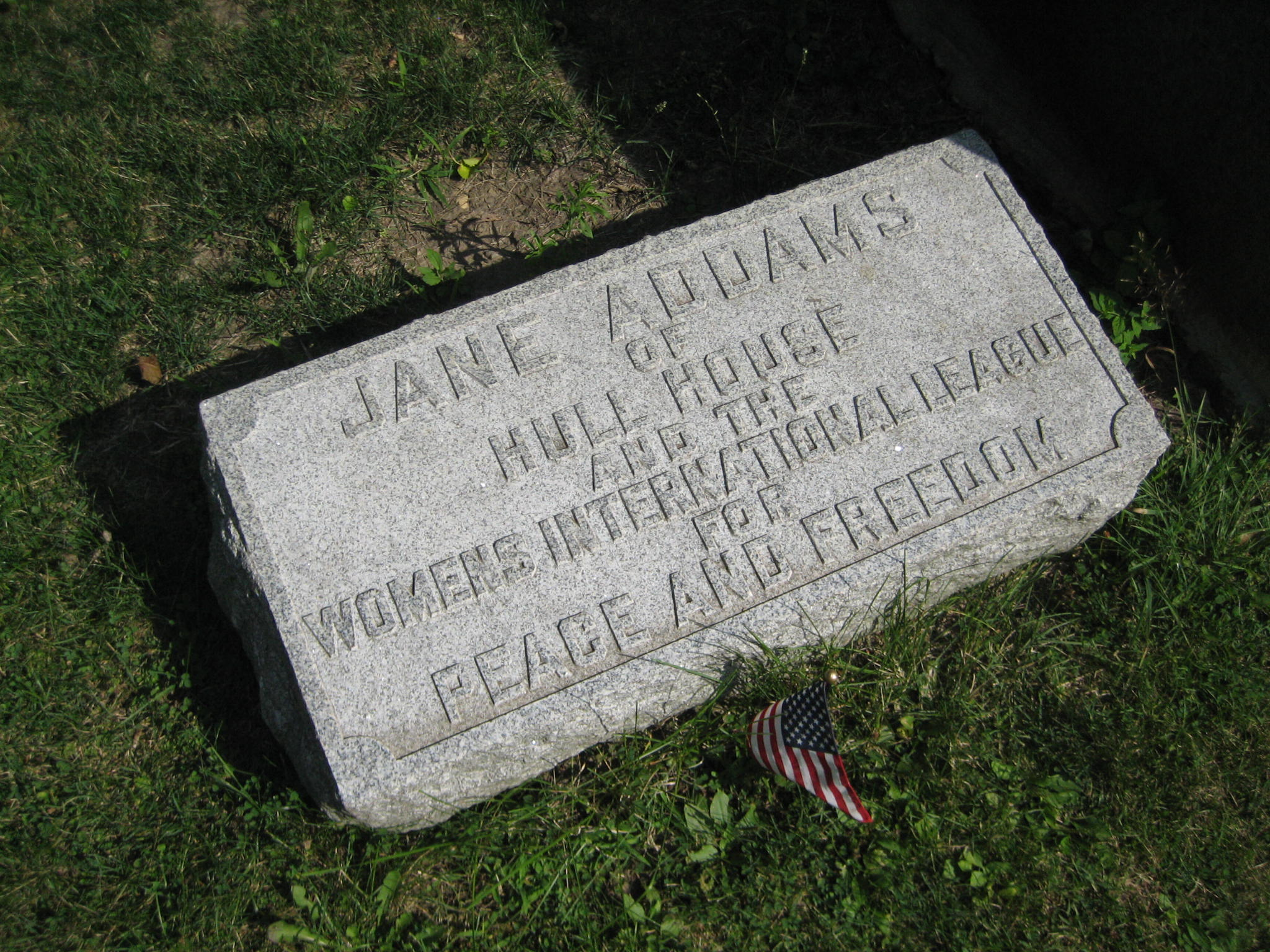
Jane Addams' tombstone

The Addams family plot is marked with an obelisk, in Cedarville Cemetery, a short distance from her birthplace at the John H. Addams Homestead. At Addams' request, her tombstone epitaph mentions her as associated with Hull House and the Women's International League for Peace and Freedom, but neglects to mention her Nobel Peace Prize. Addams penned this epitaph herself.

In August 2004, the obelisk monument at the Addams family plot underwent a restoration, headed by Flachtemeier Monuments, a Freeport company. The monument restoration was funded by a donation from the Jane Addams Peace Association. Work included repairs to the monument's base, and the restablization of the marker.
