= German Valley, Illinois =

German Valley
- Village
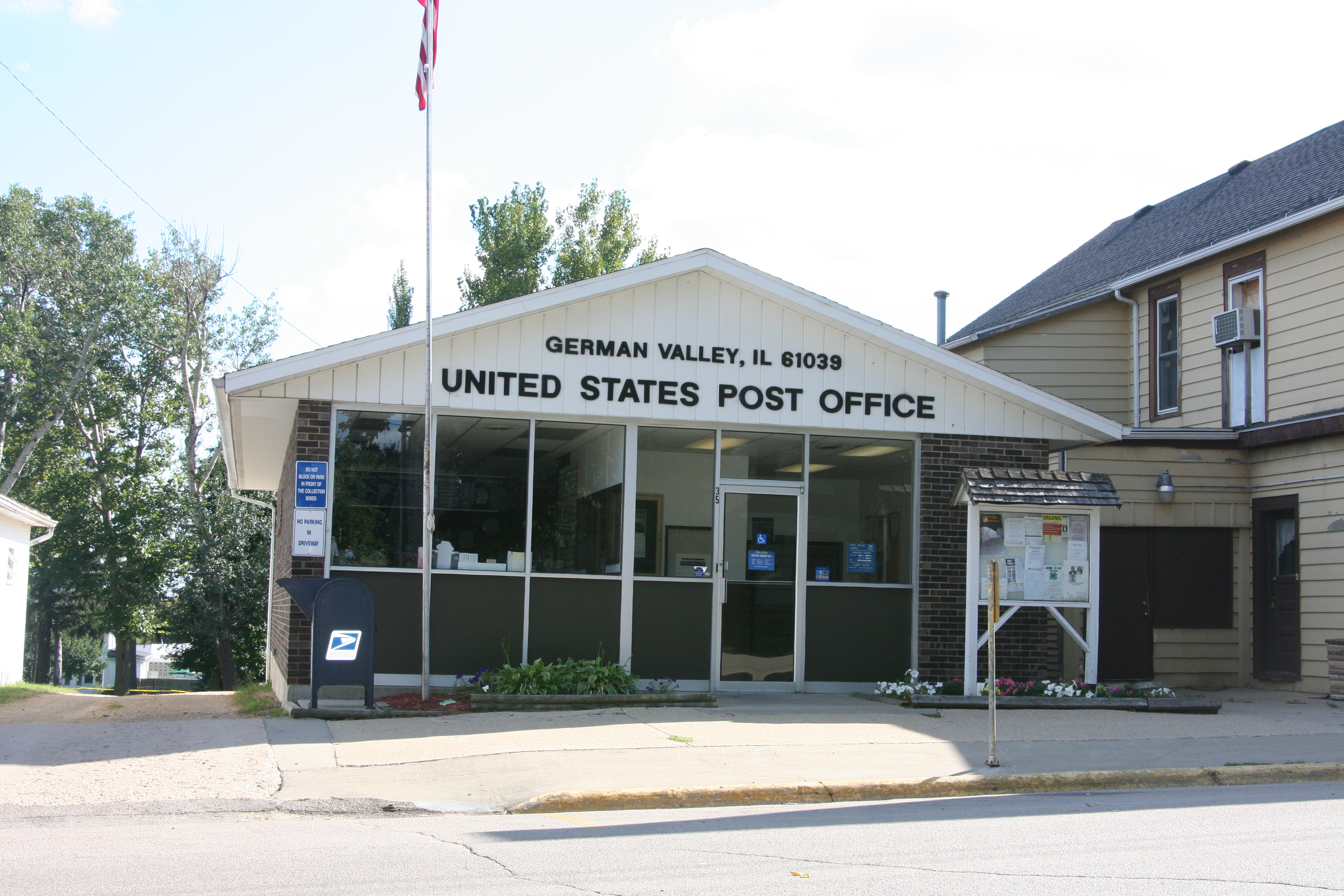
- Post office for German Valley
- Nickname: Deutsch Ditch
- Location of German Valley in Stephenson County, Illinois.
- Coordinates: 42°12′52″N 89°29′05″W
- Country: United States
- State: Illinois
- County: Stephenson
- Township: Ridott

Area
  - Total: 0.48 sq mi (1.24 km^{2})
  - Land: 0.48 sq mi (1.24 km^{2})
  - Water: 0 sq mi (0.00 km^{2})
- Elevation: 824 ft (251 m)

Population (2020)
  - Total: 433
  - Density: 905.7/sq mi (349.71/km^{2})
- Time zone: UTC-6 (CST)
  - Summer (DST): UTC-5 (CDT)
- ZIP code: 61039
- Area code: 815
- FIPS code: 17-29093
- GNIS feature ID: 2398953
- Website: germanvalleyil.gov.

German Valley is a village in Stephenson County, Illinois, United States. German Valley is located four miles south of U.S. Route 20 between Freeport and Rockford. German Valley had a population of 433 at the 2020 census, with a 2023 estimate of 424.

== Geography ==
According to the 2010 census, the village has a total area of 0.48 square miles (1.2 km^{2}), all land.

== Demographics ==
Historical population
Census	Pop.	Note	%±
1910	144		—
1920	187		29.9%
1930	191		2.1%
1940	180		−5.8%
1950	206		14.4%
1960	224		8.7%
1970	206		−8.0%
1980	414		101.0%
1990	480		15.9%
2000	481		0.2%
2010	463		−3.7%
2020	433		−6.5%
U.S. Decennial Census

As of the census of 2000, there were 481 people, 179 households, and 138 families residing in the village. The population density was 987.8 inhabitants per square mile (381.4/km^{2}). There were 187 housing units at an average density of 384.0 per square mile (148.3/km^{2}). The racial makeup of the village was 99.58% White, 0.21% Asian and 0.21% Pacific Islander. Hispanic or Latino of any race were 1.87% of the population.

There were 179 households, out of which 41.3% had children under the age of 18 living with them, 66.5% were married couples living together, 6.1% had a female householder with no husband present, and 22.9% were non-families. 19.0% of all households were made up of individuals, and 12.8% had someone living alone who was 65 years of age or older. The average household size was 2.69 and the average family size was 3.07.

In the village, the population was spread out, with 29.3% under the age of 18, 5.8% from 18 to 24, 33.5% from 25 to 44, 18.3% from 45 to 64, and 13.1% who were 65 years of age or older. The median age was 35 years. For every 100 females there were 96.3 males. For every 100 females age 18 and over, there were 98.8 males.

The median income for a household in the village was $42,500, and the median income for a family was $48,750. Males had a median income of $31,111 versus $22,308 for females. The per capita income for the village was $18,564. About 6.4% of families and 6.2% of the population were below the poverty line, including 4.7% of those under age 18 and 20.4% of those age 65 or over.

== Animal Sanctuary ==
The village is home to an animal sanctuary for exotic pets called Critter Camp Exotic Pet Sanctuary.

== Education ==
It is in the Forrestville Valley Community Unit School District 221.
