= Silver Creek Township, Illinois =

Silver Creek Township
- Township
- Location in Stephenson County
- Coordinates: 42°14′48″N 89°34′01″W
- Country: United States
- State: Illinois
- County: Stephenson

Government
  - Supervisor: Lee Runte

Area
  - Total: 35 sq mi (91 km^{2})
  - Land: 34.98 sq mi (90.6 km^{2})
  - Water: 0.02 sq mi (0.052 km^{2}) 0.06%
- Elevation: 823 ft (251 m)

Population (2010)
  - Estimate (2016): 666
  - Density: 19.9/sq mi (7.7/km^{2})
- Time zone: UTC-6 (CST)
  - Summer (DST): UTC-5 (CDT)
- FIPS code: 17-177-69953

Silver Creek Township is a township in Stephenson County, Illinois. As of the 2010 census, its population was 696 and it contained 332 housing units.

== Geography ==
Silver Creek is Townships 26 and 27 (part) North, Range 8 East of the Fourth Principal Meridian.

Silver Creek Township is located at 42°14′48″N 89°34′01″W at an elevation of 823 feet (251 meters). According to the 2010 census, the township has a total area of 35 square miles (91 km^{2}), of which 34.98 square miles (90.6 km^{2}) (or 99.94%) is land and 0.02 square miles (0.052 km^{2}) (or 0.06%) is water. Silver Creek Township borders the city of Freeport, the county seat of Stephenson County, to the northwest.

== History ==
Thomas Craine first settled Silver Creek Township in August 1835.

=== Mills ===
Brown's Mill was built four miles east of Freeport on the Pecatonica River by Caleb W. Brown in 1857. The stone grist mill closed in 1903 and was converted to a power plant by A.J. Goddard in 1908. For a short time it generated power for the street car system in Freeport. After a fire in 1950 partially destroyed the building it was rebuilt and converted to a residence. It was still standing on Brown's Mill Road in 2014.

== Demographics ==
Historical population
Census	Pop.	Note	%±
2016 (est.)	666
U.S. Decennial Census

As of the census of 2000, there were 739 people, 293 households, and 219 families in Silver Creek Township.
