= Stephenson County Courthouse =

Local government building in the United States

- U.S. National Register of Historic Places
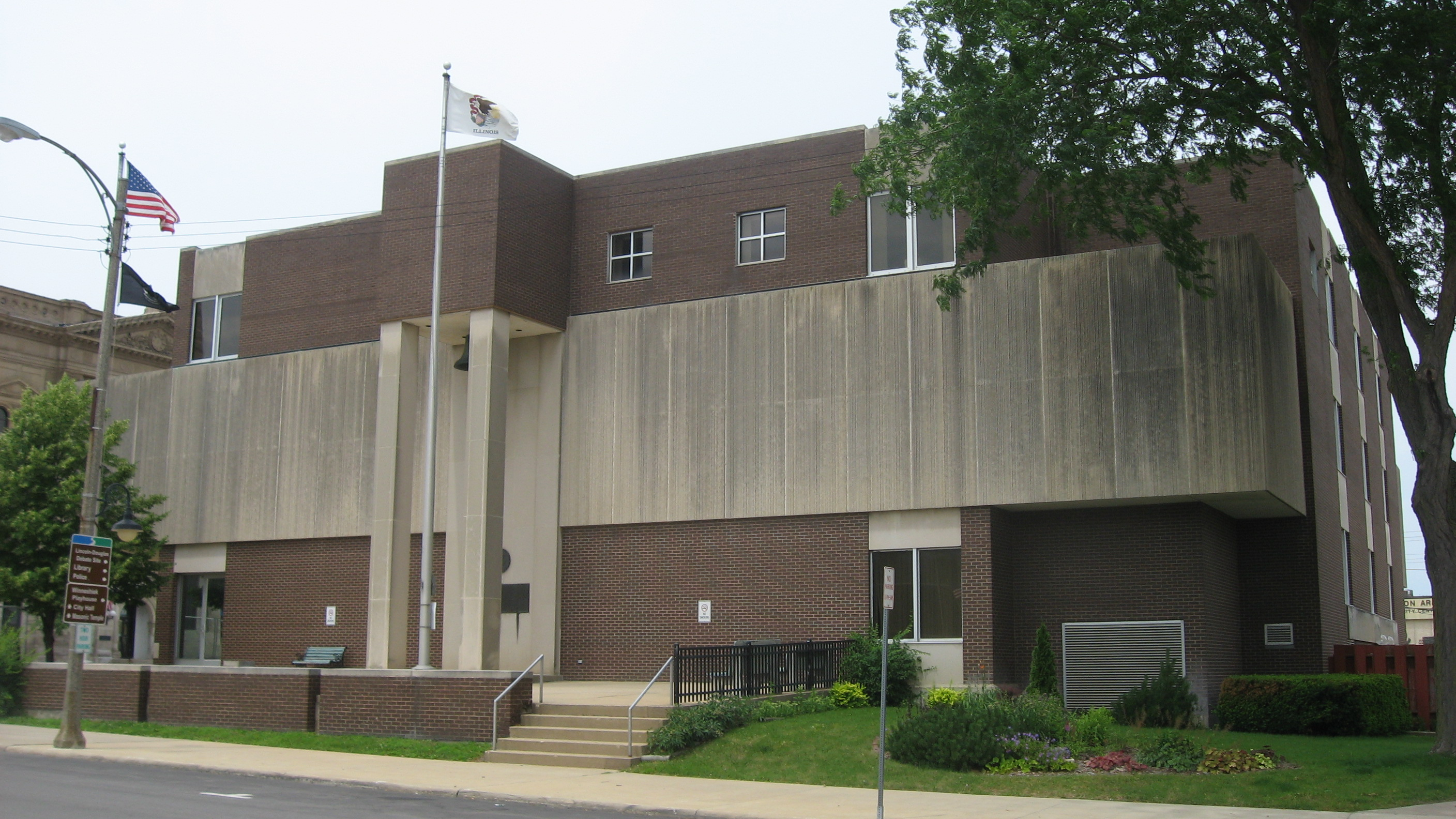
- The present courthouse, built on the site of the historic 1870 courthouse

- Location within Illinois Location within the United States
- Interactive map showing the location of Stephenson County Courthouse
- Location: Courthouse Sq., Freeport, Illinois
- Coordinates: 42°17′53″N 89°37′19″W
- Area: 1 acre (0.40 ha)
- Built: 1870
- Architect: Elijah E. Myers
- Architectural style: Second Empire
- NRHP reference No.: 74002284
- Added to NRHP: January 17, 1974

The Stephenson County Courthouse, located on Courthouse Square in Freeport, is the county courthouse serving Stephenson County, Illinois. The present courthouse was built in 1975, replacing a historic courthouse built on the site in 1870. Elijah E. Myers, who went on to design three state capitols, designed the 1870 courthouse in the Second Empire style; the building, which featured a mansard roof and a projecting entrance pavilion, was Myers' only Second Empire work. The 1870 courthouse was listed on the National Register of Historic Places in 1974, but it was demolished later that year as insufficient for the county's needs; despite its demolition, it remains listed on the National Register. The present courthouse was completed the following year, though by 2008, it was also reported to have insufficient space for the county's needs.
