= Willow Lake, Illinois =

- Census-designated place
- Location within Illinois Location within the United States
- Coordinates: 42°19′52″N 89°37′46″W
- Country: USA
- State: Illinois
- County: Stephenson
- Townships: Harlem; Lancaster

Area
  - Total: 2.77 sq mi (7.17 km^{2})
  - Land: 2.73 sq mi (7.08 km^{2})
  - Water: 0.039 sq mi (0.10 km^{2})
- Elevation: 814 ft (248 m)

Population (2020)
  - Total: 1,026
  - Density: 375.6/sq mi (145.01/km^{2})
- Time zone: UTC-6 (Central (CST))
  - Summer (DST): UTC-5 (CDT)
- ZIP Code: 61032 (Freeport)
- Area codes: 815, 779
- FIPS code: 17-82029
- GNIS feature ID: 2806586

Willow Lake is a census-designated place (CDP) surrounding a lake of the same name in Stephenson County, Illinois, United States. It is in the center of the county, on the north side of U.S. Route 20 and 3 miles (5 km) north of the center of Freeport, the county seat. As of the 2020 census, Willow Lake had a population of 1,026.

Willow Lake was first listed as a CDP prior to the 2020 census.

== Demographics ==
Historical population
Census	Pop.	Note	%±
2020	1,026		—
U.S. Decennial Census

Willow Lake first appeared as a census designated place in the 2020 U.S. census.

=== 2020 census ===
As of the 2020 census, Willow Lake had a population of 1,026. The median age was 56.7 years. 14.3% of residents were under the age of 18 and 31.9% of residents were 65 years of age or older. For every 100 females there were 103.2 males, and for every 100 females age 18 and over there were 102.5 males age 18 and over.

36.1% of residents lived in urban areas, while 63.9% lived in rural areas.

There were 462 households in Willow Lake, of which 15.8% had children under the age of 18 living in them. Of all households, 62.1% were married-couple households, 17.3% were households with a male householder and no spouse or partner present, and 18.8% were households with a female householder and no spouse or partner present. About 30.7% of all households were made up of individuals and 18.2% had someone living alone who was 65 years of age or older.

There were 475 housing units, of which 2.7% were vacant. The homeowner vacancy rate was 0.2% and the rental vacancy rate was 2.4%.

Racial composition as of the 2020 census
Race	Number	Percent
White	957	93.3%
Black or African American	24	2.3%
American Indian and Alaska Native	1	0.1%
Asian	10	1.0%
Native Hawaiian and Other Pacific Islander	0	0.0%
Some other race	7	0.7%
Two or more races	27	2.6%
Hispanic or Latino (of any race)	24	2.3%

== Education ==
It is in the Freeport School District 145. The district operates Freeport High School.
