= Ridott Township, Illinois =

Ridott Township
- Township
- Location in Stephenson County
- Coordinates: 42°15′51″N 89°27′42″W
- Country: United States
- State: Illinois
- County: Stephenson

Government
  - Supervisor: Dennis R. Becker

Area
  - Total: 53.68 sq mi (139.0 km^{2})
  - Land: 53.63 sq mi (138.9 km^{2})
  - Water: 0.06 sq mi (0.16 km^{2}) 0.11%
- Elevation: 827 ft (252 m)

Population (2010)
  - Estimate (2016): 1,398
  - Density: 27.1/sq mi (10.5/km^{2})
- Time zone: UTC-6 (CST)
  - Summer (DST): UTC-5 (CDT)
- FIPS code: 17-177-64057

Ridott Township is located in Stephenson County, Illinois, USA. At the 2010 census, its population was 1,451 and it contained 612 housing units. The villages of Ridott and German Valley are located in this township.

Ridott Township was named for an early settler.

== Geography ==
Ridott is Townships 26 and 27 (part) North, Range 9 East of the Fourth Principal Meridian.

According to the 2010 census, the township has a total area of 53.68 square miles (139.0 km^{2}), of which 53.63 square miles (138.9 km^{2}) (or 99.91%) is land and 0.06 square miles (0.16 km^{2}) (or 0.11%) is water.

=== Stagecoach inns ===
Hunt's Tavern was built after 1842 by Thomas Hunt from Nottingham, England, along the Old State Road number 2, now U.S. Route 20. Frink, Walker & Company stage line, Chicago to Galena, used this road 1839 to 1854. The stone tavern burned in 1914.

== Demographics ==
Historical population
Census	Pop.	Note	%±
2016 (est.)	1,398
U.S. Decennial Census
