= Dakota Township, Illinois =

Dakota Township
- Township
- Location in Stephenson County
- Coordinates: 42°24′55″N 89°32′46″W
- Country: United States
- State: Illinois
- County: Stephenson

Government
  - Supervisor: Jim A. Yeoman

Area
  - Total: 18.01 sq mi (46.6 km^{2})
  - Land: 18.01 sq mi (46.6 km^{2})
  - Water: 0 sq mi (0 km^{2}) 0%
- Elevation: 919 ft (280 m)

Population (2010)
  - Estimate (2016): 773
  - Density: 45.3/sq mi (17.5/km^{2})
- Time zone: UTC-6 (CST)
  - Summer (DST): UTC-5 (CDT)
- FIPS code: 17-177-18355

Dakota Township is located in Stephenson County, Illinois, United States. As of the 2010 census, its population was 815 and it contained 349 housing units. The village of Dakota and the unincorporated community of Afolkey are located in the township, and once Fountain Creek was located here also.

== Geography ==
Dakota is Township 28 North, Range 8 (part) East of the Fourth Principal Meridian.

According to the 2010 census, the township has a total area of 18.01 square miles (46.6 km^{2}), all land.

== Demographics ==
Historical population
Census	Pop.	Note	%±
2016 (est.)	773
U.S. Decennial Census
