= Evarts, Illinois =

- Unincorporated community
- Location within Illinois Location within the United States
- Coordinates: 42°15′11″N 89°28′28″W
- Country: United States
- State: Illinois
- County: Stephenson
- Elevation: 824 ft (251 m)
- Time zone: UTC-6 (Central (CST))
  - Summer (DST): UTC-5 (CDT)
- Zip code: 61029
- Area codes: 815 & 779
- GNIS feature ID: 422680

Evarts is an unincorporated community in Stephenson County, Illinois, United States.
