= Ridott, Illinois =

Ridott
- Village
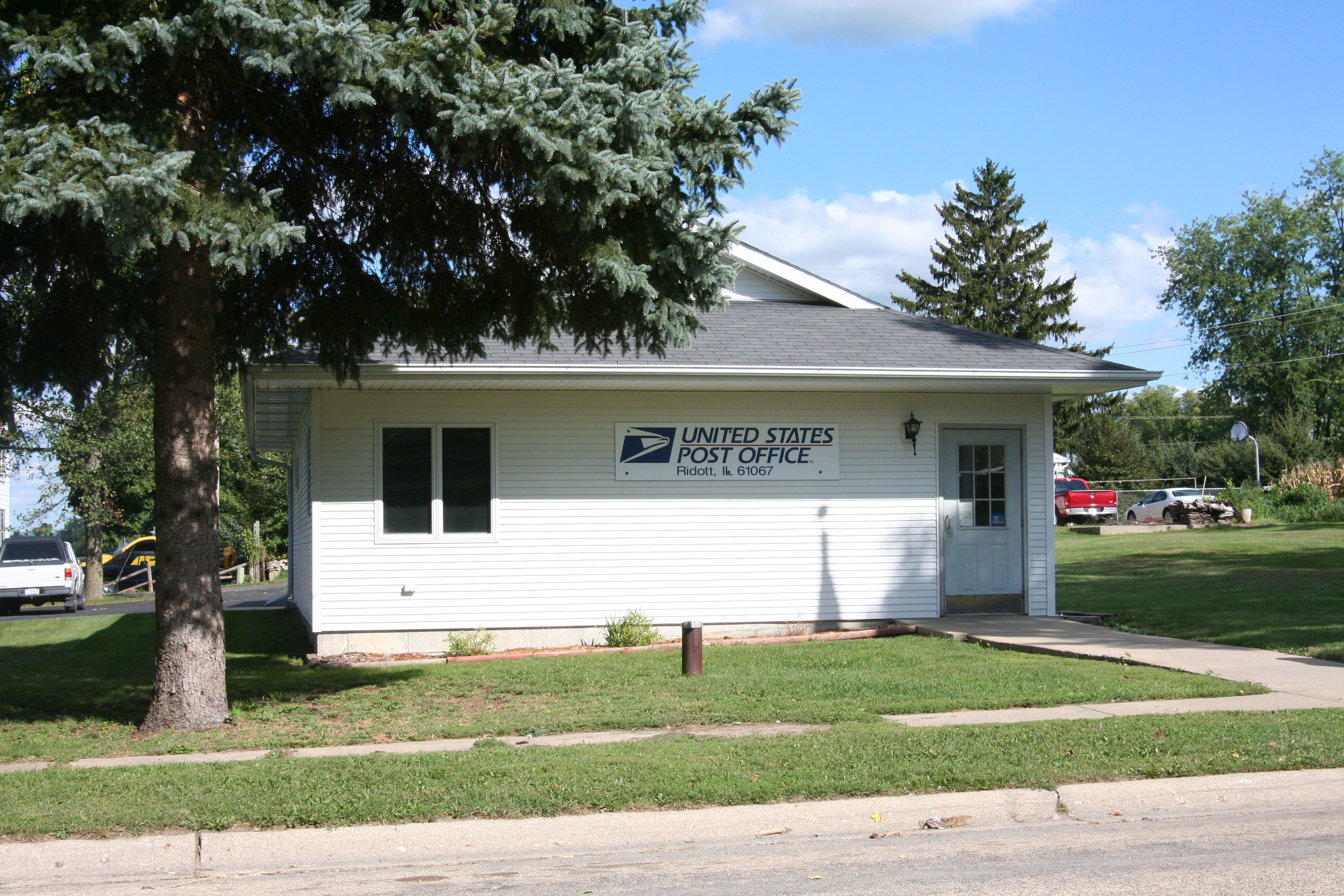
- Post office for Ridott.

- Location of Ridott in Stephenson County, Illinois.
- Coordinates: 42°17′49″N 89°28′38″W
- Country: United States
- State: Illinois
- County: Stephenson
- Township: Ridott

Area
  - Total: 0.073 sq mi (0.19 km^{2})
  - Land: 0.073 sq mi (0.19 km^{2})
  - Water: 0 sq mi (0.00 km^{2})
- Elevation: 768 ft (234 m)

Population (2020)
  - Total: 124
  - Density: 1,668/sq mi (644.2/km^{2})
- Time zone: UTC-6 (CST)
  - Summer (DST): UTC-5 (CDT)
- ZIP code: 61067
- Area code: 815
- FIPS code: 17-64044
- GNIS feature ID: 2399075

Ridott is a village in Stephenson County, Illinois, United States. As of the 2020 census, Ridott had a population of 124.

== History ==
Originally called Cochranville, Ridott was renamed in 1863 after Ridott Township. A post office was established as Cochranville in 1860, and renamed Ridott in 1861.

== Geography ==
According to the 2010 census, Ridott has a total area of 0.1 square miles (0.26 km^{2}), all land.

== Demographics ==
Historical population
Census	Pop.	Note	%±
1900	212		—
1910	173		−18.4%
1920	187		8.1%
1930	201		7.5%
1940	169		−15.9%
1950	187		10.7%
1960	221		18.2%
1970	244		10.4%
1980	194		−20.5%
1990	156		−19.6%
2000	159		1.9%
2010	164		3.1%
2020	124		−24.4%
U.S. Decennial Census

As of the census of 2000, there were 159 people, 62 households, and 47 families residing in the village. The population density was 1,518.9 inhabitants per square mile (586.5/km^{2}). There were 68 housing units at an average density of 649.6 per square mile (250.8/km^{2}). The racial makeup of the village was 100.00% White.

There were 62 households, out of which 35.5% had children under the age of 18 living with them, 71.0% were married couples living together, 4.8% had a female householder with no husband present, and 22.6% were non-families. 17.7% of all households were made up of individuals, and 9.7% had someone living alone who was 65 years of age or older. The average household size was 2.56 and the average family size was 2.94.

In the village, the population was distributed as follows: 25.8% were under the age of 18, 4.4% were between 18 and 24, 32.1% were from 25 to 44, 24.5% were from 45 to 64, and 13.2% were 65 years of age or older. The median age was 40 years. For every 100 females, there were 114.9 males. Among females aged 18 and over, there were 103.4 males for every 100 females.

The median income for a household in the village was $41,875, and the median income for a family was $46,042. Males had a median income of $29,750 versus $19,583 for females. The per capita income for the village was $16,846. None of the families and 2.9% of the population were living below the poverty line, including no under eighteens and 12.9% of those over 64.

== Education ==
It is in the Freeport School District 145. The district operates Freeport High School.
