= Jefferson Township, Stephenson County, Illinois =

Jefferson Township
- Township
- Location in Stephenson County
- Coordinates: 42°14′12″N 89°53′35″W
- Country: United States
- State: Illinois
- County: Stephenson

Government
  - Supervisor: Melvin Kempel

Area
  - Total: 18.26 sq mi (47.3 km^{2})
  - Land: 18.26 sq mi (47.3 km^{2})
  - Water: 0 sq mi (0 km^{2}) 0%
- Elevation: 869 ft (265 m)

Population (2010)
  - Estimate (2016): 259
  - Density: 14.7/sq mi (5.7/km^{2})
- Time zone: UTC-6 (CST)
  - Summer (DST): UTC-5 (CDT)
- FIPS code: 17-177-38284

Jefferson Township is located in Stephenson County, Illinois, United States. As of the 2010 census, its population was 268 and it contained 117 housing units.

== Geography ==
Jefferson is Township 26 North, Range 5 (part) East of the Fourth Principal Meridian.

According to the 2010 census, the township has a total area of 18.26 square miles (47.3 km^{2}), all land.

== Demographics ==
Historical population
| Census | Pop. | Note | %± |
|---|---|---|---|
| 2016 (est.) | 259 |
U.S. Decennial Census
