= Freeport School District 145 =

School district in Illinois, United States

Freeport School District 145 (FSD 145) is a school district headquartered in Freeport, Illinois.

The district includes Freeport, Cedarville, Ridott, and Willow Lake.

== History ==
In 2019, Anna Alvarado, who originated from Manila, became the superintendent. She previously worked for Chicago Public Schools.

In 2025 the district planned to change the grade configurations of multiple schools. Most elementary schools changed from ending at the 4th grade to ending at the 5th grade, while the magnet school was to change from a K-6 elementary school into a K-8 school.

== Schools ==
Secondary schools

- Freeport High School
- Freeport Middle School

K-8 schools

- Jones-Farrar International Baccalaureate School - Was a K-6 elementary school, with the 7th grade added in 2025, and the 8th grade is scheduled to be added in 2026. The former Jones-Farrar building became the preschool in 2025, while Jones-Farrar moved into the former Carl Sandburg school.

Elementary schools

- Blackhawk Elementary School
- Center Elementary School
- Empire Elementary School
- Lincoln-Douglas Elementary School

Preschool

- Early Childhood Center - Formed in 2025

Former schools

- Carl Sandburg Middle School (grades 5-6) - Closed in 2025, with building converted into the Jones-Farrar School.
