= Kent Township, Illinois =

Kent Township
- Township
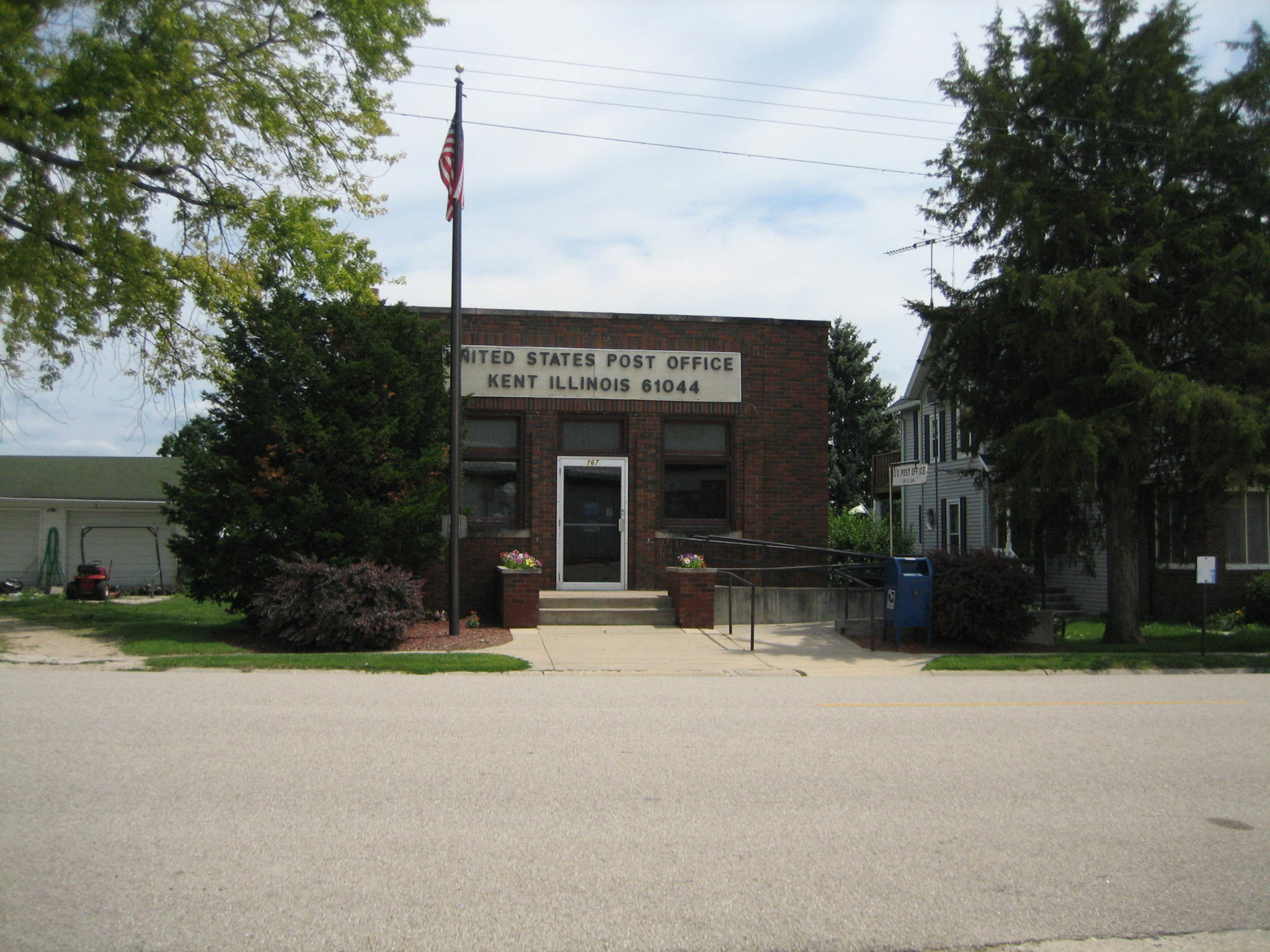
- The U.S. Post Office in the unincorporated community of Kent, Illinois.

- Location in Stephenson County
- Coordinates: 42°19′33″N 89°51′44″W
- Country: United States
- State: Illinois
- County: Stephenson

Government
  - Supervisor: Kelli Huneke

Area
  - Total: 35.47 sq mi (91.9 km^{2})
  - Land: 35.47 sq mi (91.9 km^{2})
  - Water: 0 sq mi (0 km^{2}) 0%
- Elevation: 840 ft (260 m)

Population (2010)
  - Estimate (2016): 678
  - Density: 19.8/sq mi (7.6/km^{2})
- Time zone: UTC-6 (CST)
  - Summer (DST): UTC-5 (CDT)
- FIPS code: 17-177-39610

Kent Township is located in Stephenson County, Illinois. As of the 2010 census, its population was 702 and it contained 270 housing units. The unincorporated community of Kent is located in the township.

== Geography ==
Kent is Township 27 North, Ranges 5 (part) and 6 (part) East of the Fourth Principal Meridian.

According to the 2010 census, the township has a total area of 35.47 square miles (91.9 km^{2}), all land.

== Demographics ==
Historical population
Census	Pop.	Note	%±
2016 (est.)	678
U.S. Decennial Census
