= Florence, Stephenson County, Illinois =

Florence, Illinois
- Unincorporated community
- Location within Illinois Location within the United States
- Coordinates: 42°12′52″N 89°39′35″W
- Country: United States
- State: Illinois
- County: Stephenson
- Elevation: 856 ft (261 m)
- Time zone: UTC-6 (Central (CST))
  - Summer (DST): UTC-5 (CDT)
- Area codes: 815 & 779
- GNIS feature ID: 408469

Florence (also Florence Station) is an unincorporated community in Stephenson County, Illinois, United States. As of 2022 census data, it was estimated to have a population of 1,214.
