= Waddams Township, Illinois =

Waddams Township
- Township
- Location in Stephenson County
- Coordinates: 42°25′03″N 89°45′10″W
- Country: United States
- State: Illinois
- County: Stephenson

Government
  - Supervisor: Connie Barrett

Area
  - Total: 35.83 sq mi (92.8 km^{2})
  - Land: 35.81 sq mi (92.7 km^{2})
  - Water: 0.01 sq mi (0.026 km^{2}) 0.03%
- Elevation: 801 ft (244 m)

Population (2010)
  - Estimate (2016): 773
  - Density: 22.5/sq mi (8.7/km^{2})
- Time zone: UTC-6 (CST)
  - Summer (DST): UTC-5 (CDT)
- FIPS code: 17-177-78318

Waddams Township is located in Stephenson County, Illinois. As of the 2010 census, its population was 807 and it contained 360 housing units. The unincorporated communities of McConnell and Damascus are located in the township, and once New Pennsylvania was located here also.

== History ==
On March 6, 1848 the Illinois State Constitution was adopted and went into effect on April 1, 1848. In the new constitution was an "Act" providing for a county, upon majority vote, to develop township governments. On November 5, 1849 Stephenson County voted on the "Act" and passed it with a vote of 973 to 99. In December three commissioners were appointed to divide the county from its six precinct form of government to sixteen townships. The commissioners were Levi Robey, Robert Forster and Erastus Torrey. On November 5, 1850 the supervisors for the township were elected.

Waddams was one of the original sixteen townships. Michael Lawver was its first supervisor. Some of the areas earliest settlers lived in the vicinity of the newly formed section. The first settlers in the township were Levi Robey and his wife Almira (Waite). He claimed about one half of a section of land in the northwest part of the township. He first arrived in the county with his parents and siblings at Brewster's Ferry in November 1834. After making his claim he proceeded to build a double log cabin on the west side of the river. He cut logs for the cabin on the east side of the river and then pulled them across the frozen river by horse. The family moved into their new home on Valentine's Day of 1835 and lived there for twenty years. The site of his first cabin is at the foot of a hill at the present Robert Kleckler Farm on North Stubbe Road. He later built a new house ½ mile southwest of the first. That house still stands at the northwest corner of Fisher and North Stubbe Roads. When he settled in the area in 1835 his only white neighbors were his family at Brewster's Ferry, William Waddams and John Dixon (living at the present site of Dixon, IL). Also a man named Kent who lived in the area that is now Rockford, Illinois, and a man named "Mack" who married an Indian woman and lived at the mouth of the Pecatonica River.

Many firsts are attributed to Levi Robey. He was the first Justice of the Peace for the county. He conducted the first marriage ceremony in Stephenson County which after its formation required a marriage license. The couple he married were Eunice Waddams, (daughter of William), and George Place, wed on July 4, 1837. Robey was also the first chairman of the Old Settlers Association and on the executive committee for the Soldiers Monument.

Hubbard Graves arrived in 1835 and was also a notable figure in the history of Waddams Township. His wife Cynthia, sister of Levi Robey, accompanied him. Graves was the county's first tax collector. His total tax collected was $96.00. He was also a county sheriff in 1838 and was in state legislation serving Stephenson and Carroll Counties from 1842 - 1844.

Pells Manny came to Waddams Township in 1836 and settled in the west-central portion. He is best noted for the invention of the "Manny Header" and "Manny Reaper". His factory was located at the mouth of Waddams Creek near the mill run by William Soladay and Benjamin Sheckler. The location is approximately one mile south of McConnell. A Post Office was moved to the location in 1840 from Waddams Grove for the convenience of its customers. Manny's son, John Henry Manny, started a plant in Rockford to manufacture the reaper. In 1856 Pells started a plant in Freeport. He later moved to Freeport. The Post Office closed on March 11, 1857. A lawsuit was filed by Cyrus McCormick against Manny's patent right for the reaper. Manny prevailed in the suit, with an opinion by Supreme Court Judge John McLean.

== Geography ==
Waddams is township 28 North, Ranges 6 (part) and 7 (part) East of the Fourth Principal Meridian.

According to the 2010 census, the township has a total area of 35.83 square miles (92.8 km^{2}), of which 35.81 square miles (92.7 km^{2}) (or 99.94%) is land and 0.01 square miles (0.026 km^{2}) (or 0.03%) is water.

== Demographics ==
Historical population
| Census | Pop. | Note | %± |
|---|---|---|---|
| 2016 (est.) | 773 |
U.S. Decennial Census
