= Pearl City, Illinois =

Pearl City
- Village
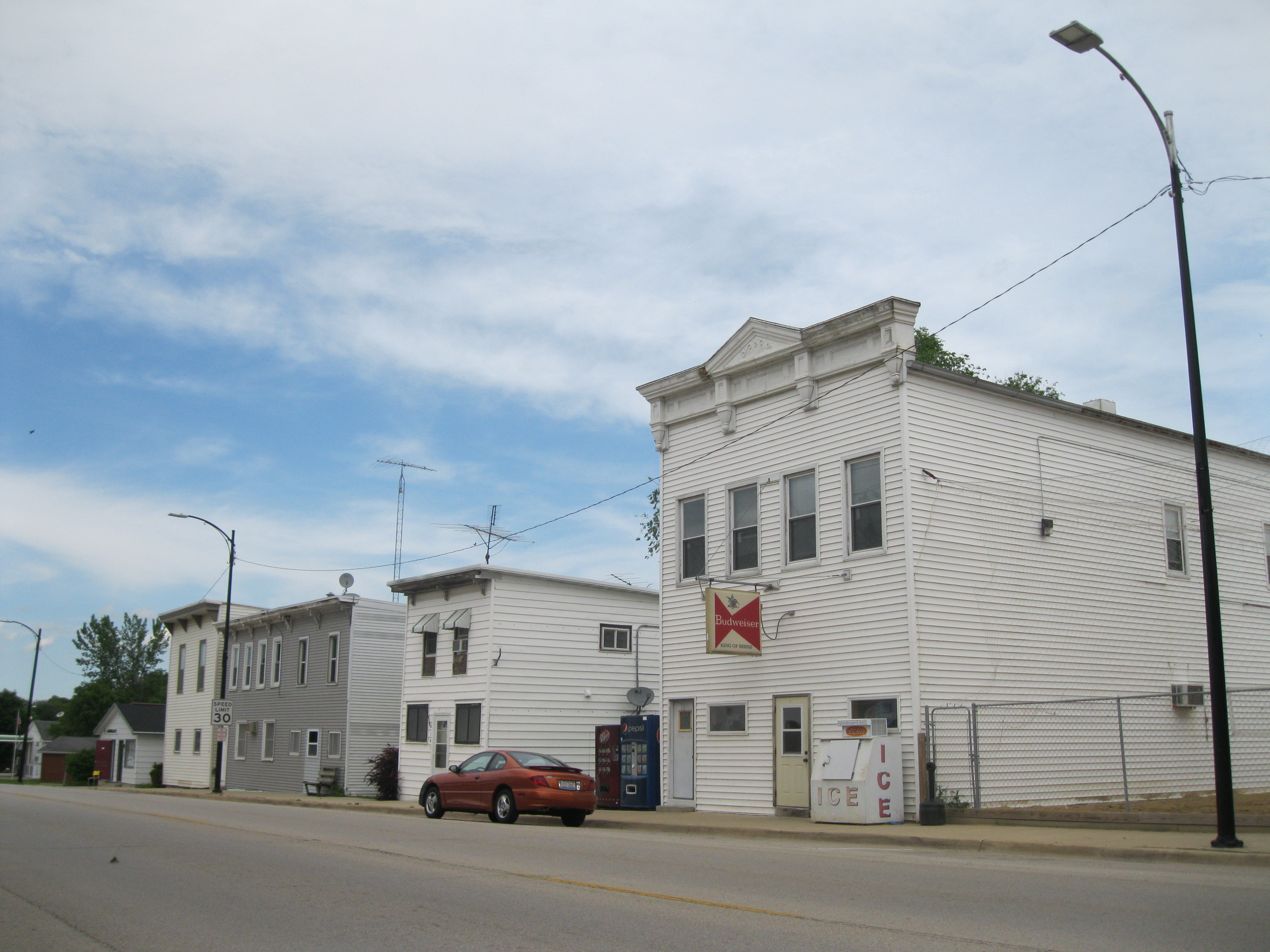
- Business district in Pearl City

- Location of Pearl City in Stephenson County, Illinois.
- Coordinates: 42°16′00″N 89°49′38″W
- Country: United States
- State: Illinois
- County: Stephenson
- Township: Loran
- Founded: March 21, 1893

Government
  - Type: Trustee-Village

Area
  - Total: 0.65 sq mi (1.68 km^{2})
  - Land: 0.64 sq mi (1.66 km^{2})
  - Water: 0.0077 sq mi (0.02 km^{2})
- Elevation: 827 ft (252 m)

Population (2020)
  - Total: 790
  - Density: 1,232/sq mi (475.8/km^{2})
- Time zone: UTC-6 (CST)
  - Summer (DST): UTC-5 (CDT)
- ZIP code: 61062
- Area code: 815
- FIPS code: 17-58369
- GNIS feature ID: 2399641
- Website: villageofpearlcity.com

Pearl City is an incorporated village in Stephenson County, Illinois. As of the 2020 census, Pearl City had a population of 790.

== Demographics ==
Historical population
Census	Pop.	Note	%±
1900	437		—
1910	485		11.0%
1920	468		−3.5%
1930	406		−13.2%
1940	447		10.1%
1950	491		9.8%
1960	488		−0.6%
1970	535		9.6%
1980	661		23.6%
1990	670		1.4%
2000	780		16.4%
2010	838		7.4%
2020	790		−5.7%
U.S. Decennial Census

As of the census of 2000, there were 780 people, 293 households, and 225 families residing in the village. The population density was 1,376.7 inhabitants per square mile (531.5/km^{2}). There were 314 housing units at an average density of 554.2 per square mile (214.0/km^{2}). The racial makeup of the village was 98.21% White, 0.38% African American, 0.13% Asian, 0.26% from other races, and 0.38% from two or more races. Hispanic or Latino of any race were 0.64% of the population.

There were 293 households, out of which 44.0% had children under the age of 18 living with them, 63.5% were married couples living together, 9.6% had a female householder with no husband present, and 23.2% were non-families. 20.1% of all households were made up of individuals, and 12.6% had someone living alone who was 65 years of age or older. The average household size was 2.66 and the average family size was 3.04.

In the village, the population was spread out, with 29.9% under the age of 18, 7.2% from 18 to 24, 29.9% from 25 to 44, 20.3% from 45 to 64, and 12.8% who were 65 years of age or older. The median age was 33 years. For every 100 females, there were 91.2 males. For every 100 females age 18 and over, there were 86.7 males. Population of 803 in 2011.

The median income for a household in the village was $43,929, and the median income for a family was $55,096. Males had a median income of $35,313 versus $24,141 for females. The per capita income for the village was $19,256. About 4.1% of families and 4.6% of the population were below the poverty line, including 2.5% of those under age 18 and 18.6% of those age 65 or over.

== Geography ==
Pearl City is located approximately 12 miles (19 km) west of Freeport and 40 miles (64 km) east of Galena. It is a part of the Freeport Micropolitan Statistical Area, which includes all of Stephenson County.

According to the 2010 census, Pearl City has a total area of 0.649 square miles (1.68 km^{2}), of which 0.64 square miles (1.66 km^{2}) (or 98.61%) is land and 0.009 square miles (0.02 km^{2}) (or 1.39%) is water.

The village is situated on Illinois Route 73, which runs south to Lanark and north to the Wisconsin border through Lena and Winslow. Pearl City is located approximately six miles south of U.S. Route 20, which traverses the US from Boston in the east to Newport, Oregon in the west.

=== Climate ===
Climate data for Pearl City, Illinois
Month	Jan	Feb	Mar	Apr	May	Jun	Jul	Aug	Sep	Oct	Nov	Dec	Year
Mean daily maximum °F (°C)	27 (−3)	32 (0)	45 (7)	57 (14)	70 (21)	79 (26)	82 (28)	81 (27)	73 (23)	61 (16)	45 (7)	30 (−1)	57 (14)
Mean daily minimum °F (°C)	10 (−12)	16 (−9)	27 (−3)	36 (2)	48 (9)	57 (14)	61 (16)	59 (15)	50 (10)	39 (4)	28 (−2)	16 (−9)	37 (3)
Average precipitation inches (mm)	1.15 (29.2)	1.40 (35.6)	2.35 (59.7)	3.52 (89.4)	3.81 (96.8)	4.65 (118.1)	3.17 (80.5)	4.35 (110.5)	3.80 (96.5)	2.70 (68.6)	2.69 (68.3)	1.61 (40.9)	35.2 (894.1)
Source: weather.com

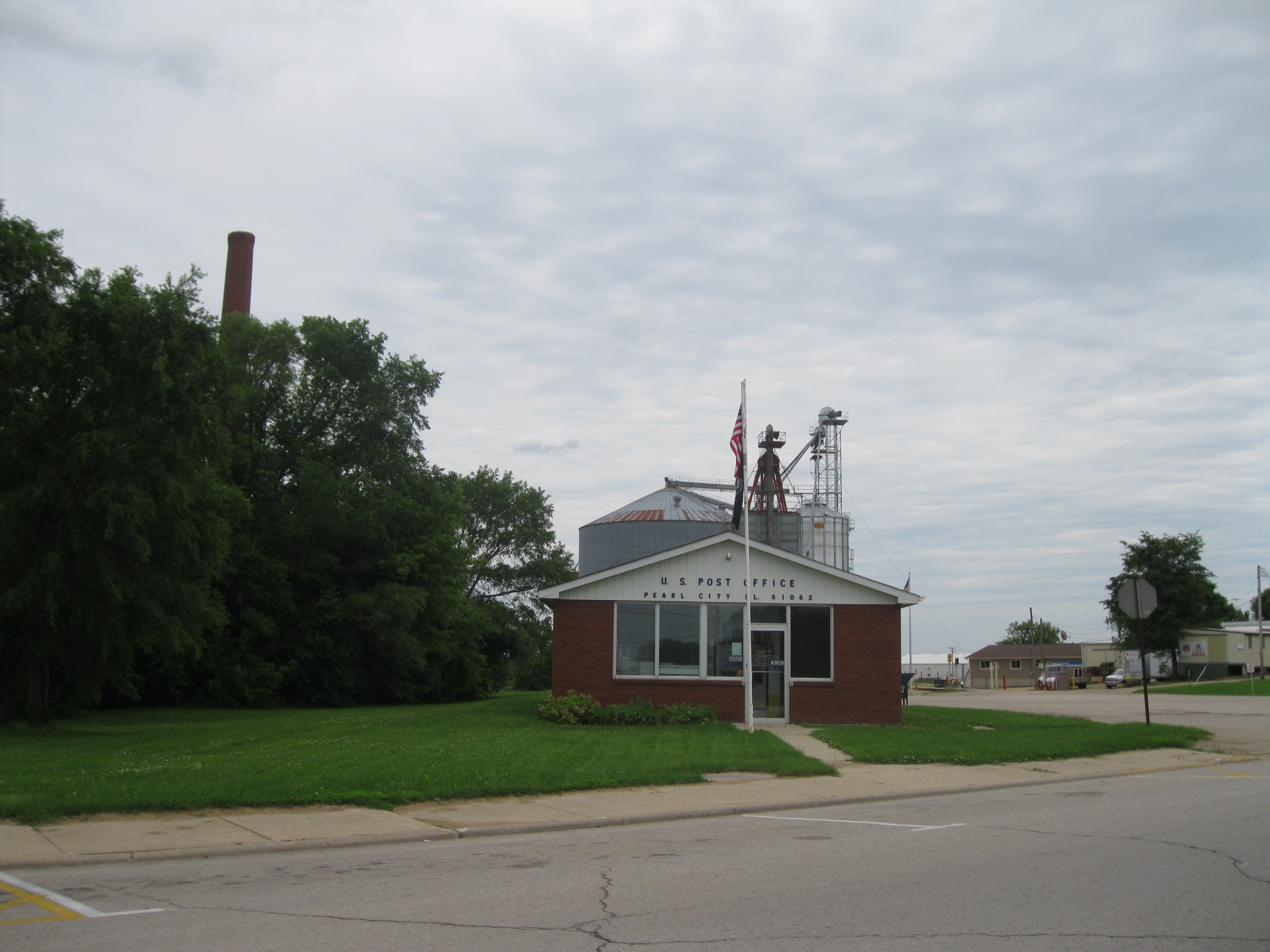
Pearl City post office

== Local organizations ==
Pearl City is home to three churches, Zion Community, St. John's Lutheran, and Pearl City Methodist. There are two local 4-H clubs, The Pearl City Hornets, and the Pearl Valley Rangers. Civic organizations include Post 1014 of the American Legion and Club 261 of the Lions Club.

== Notable people ==
- Robert E. Brinkmeier (1922–2007) was an American politician, businessman and educator
- Forrest Iandola is an American computer scientist and entrepreneur
