= Afolkey, Illinois =

- Unincorporated community
- Location within Illinois Location within the United States
- Coordinates: 42°25′57″N 89°34′28″W
- Country: United States
- State: Illinois
- County: Stephenson
- Elevation: 909 ft (277 m)
- Time zone: UTC-6 (Central (CST))
  - Summer (DST): UTC-5 (CDT)
- Postal code: 61018
- Area codes: 815 & 779
- GNIS feature ID: 422388

Afolkey is an unincorporated community in Stephenson County, Illinois. Afolkey is 4 miles (6.4 km) southeast of Orangeville.

== Education ==
Afolkey is in the Orangeville Community Unit School District which serves students in grades Kindergarten-12th grade. High School Students in grades 9-12 attend Orangeville High School. Students in grades 6-8 attend Orangeville Jr High School which is combined in the same building as the high school. Elementary students in grades K-5 attend Orangeville Elementary School.

== Business ==
Afolkey is home to Berner Food & Beverage, Inc. processing plant, commonly referred to as the "Cheese Factory" because it was previously a "natural cheese" manufacturing cheese factory and many local dairy farmers sold their milk there. In 2014, the sign outside Berner Food & Beverage, Inc. proclaimed Afolkey the "Aerosol Cheese Capital of the World." 98% of all private store brand aerosol cheese and also all of the national brand aerosol cheese known as "Easy Cheese" by the Kraft Foods spin off company, Mondelez is manufactured at the Berner plant in Afolkey.

Fountain Creek Farm - Surrounding half of Afolkey for decades has been the Fountain Creek Farm owned by the Kaiser family. Ever since the 1930s, registered Brown Swiss dairy cattle could be seen pastured close to the town of Afolkey.

== Culture ==
Afolkey Grace Evangelical Congregational Church, and Bethel/Afolkey United Methodist Church call Afolkey home. Both churches meet on Sunday mornings, and Afolkey Grace holds a youth group for teens in grades 7–12.

== Geography ==
The center of Afolkey is located at the crossroad of Factory and Afolkey roads. Fountain Creek flows through the east end of town.
