= Stephenson County, Illinois =

County in Illinois, United States

- County
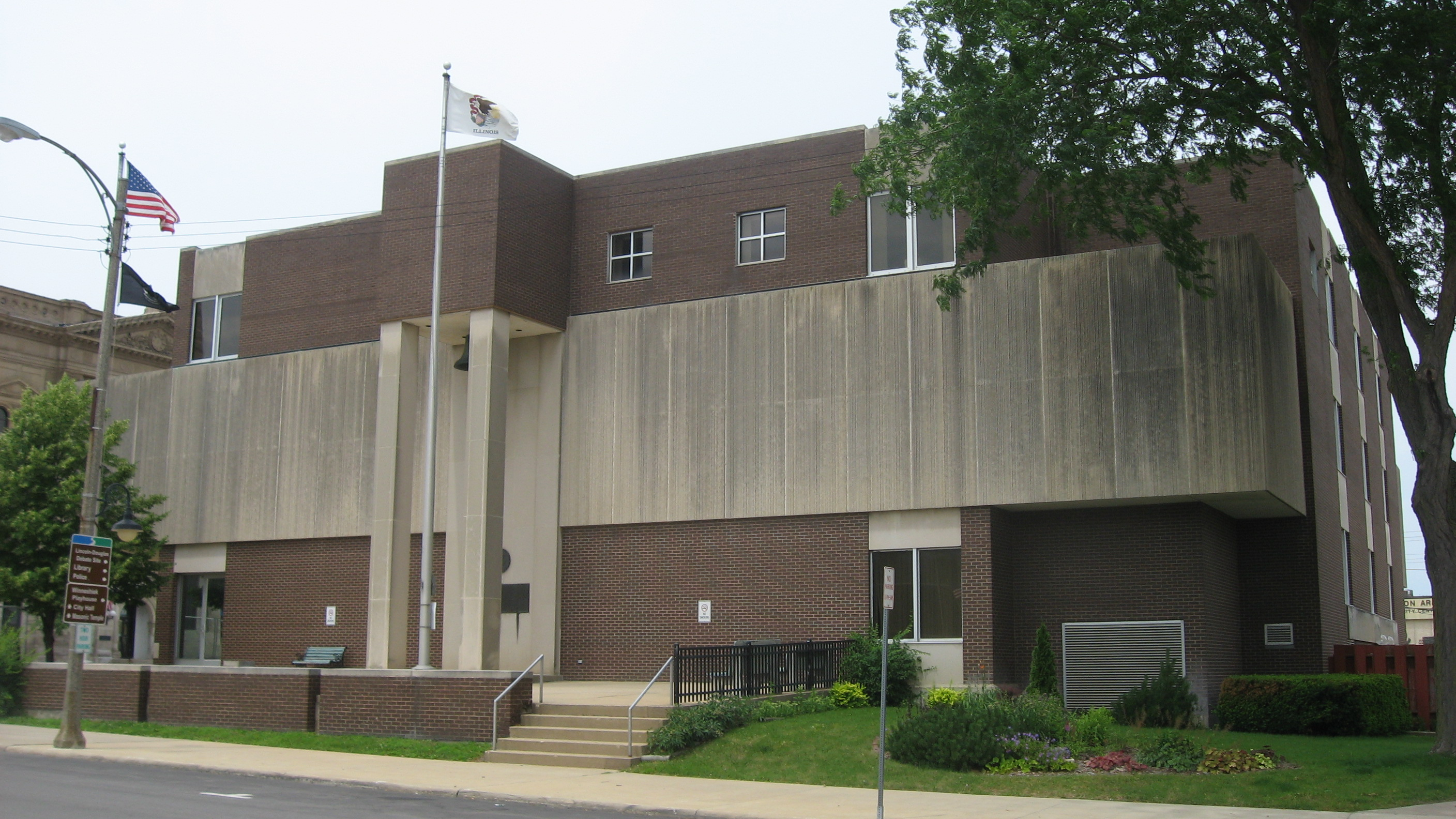
- Stephenson County Courthouse

- Location within the U.S. state of Illinois
- Coordinates: 42°21′N 89°40′W
- Country: United States
- State: Illinois
- Founded: 1837
- Named for: Benjamin Stephenson
- Seat: Freeport
- Largest city: Freeport

Area
  - Total: 565 sq mi (1,460 km^{2})
  - Land: 565 sq mi (1,460 km^{2})
  - Water: 0.5 sq mi (1.3 km^{2}) 0.09%

Population (2020)
  - Total: 44,630
  - Estimate (2025): 43,220 ▼
  - Density: 79.0/sq mi (30.5/km^{2})
- Time zone: UTC−6 (Central)
  - Summer (DST): UTC−5 (CDT)
- Congressional districts: 16th, 17th
- Website: stephensoncountyil.gov

Stephenson County is a county located in the U.S. state of Illinois. According to the 2020 United States census, it had a population of 44,630. Its county seat is Freeport. Stephenson County is included in the Freeport, IL Micropolitan Statistical Area, which is also included in the Rockford-Freeport-Rochelle, IL Combined Statistical Area.

== History ==
The land that became Stephenson County was first settled by William Waddams in 1832, who founded Waddams Grove. By 1837, population was sufficient to form Stephenson County, taking land from Jo Daviess and Winnebago counties. The county was named for Colonel Benjamin Stephenson, an official of the Illinois Territory.

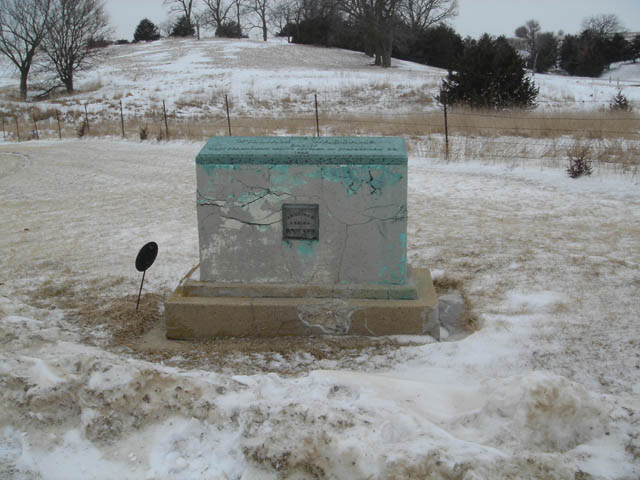
Marker marking Waddams' first settlement in Stephenson County

== Geography ==
According to the US Census Bureau, the county has a total area of 565 square miles (1,460 km^{2}), of which 565 square miles (1,460 km^{2}) is land and 0.5 square miles (1.3 km^{2}) (0.09%) is water.

=== Climate and weather ===
Freeport, Illinois

Climate chart (precipitation, max. and min. temperature)
J	F	M	A	M	J	J	A	S	O	N	D
1.3 25 9	1.3 31 14	2.1 43 25	3.2 57 36	4 69 47	4.5 78 57	3.6 82 62	4.1 80 59	3.7 73 50	2.6 61 39	2.7 44 28	1.7 30 16
- █ Average max. and min. temperatures in °F
- █ Precipitation totals in inches
- Source: The Weather Channel
Metric conversion
J	F	M	A	M	J	J	A	S	O	N	D
34 −4 −13	34 −1 −10	54 6 −4	82 14 2	101 21 8	113 26 14	91 28 17	104 27 15	93 23 10	66 16 4	68 7 −2	44 −1 −9
- █ Average max. and min. temperatures in °C
- █ Precipitation totals in mm

In recent years the average temperatures in the county seat of Freeport, have ranged from a low of 9 °F (−13 °C) in January to a high of 82 °F (28 °C) in July, although a record low of −29 °F (−34 °C) was recorded in January 2009 and a record high of 101 °F (38 °C) was recorded in July 1988. Average monthly precipitation ranged from 1.33 inches (34 mm) in January to 4.46 inches (113 mm) in June.

=== Adjacent counties ===
- Green County, Wisconsin (north)
- Winnebago County (east)
- Ogle County (southeast)
- Carroll County (southwest)
- Jo Daviess County (west)
- Lafayette County, Wisconsin (northwest)

=== Major highways ===
- US Highway 20
- Illinois Route 26
- Illinois Route 73
- Illinois Route 75

== Demographics ==
Historical population
Census	Pop.	Note	%±
1840	2,800		—
1850	11,666		316.6%
1860	25,112		115.3%
1870	30,608		21.9%
1880	31,963		4.4%
1890	31,338		−2.0%
1900	34,933		11.5%
1910	36,821		5.4%
1920	37,743		2.5%
1930	40,064		6.1%
1940	40,646		1.5%
1950	41,595		2.3%
1960	46,207		11.1%
1970	48,861		5.7%
1980	49,536		1.4%
1990	48,052		−3.0%
2000	48,979		1.9%
2010	47,711		−2.6%
2020	44,630		−6.5%
2025 (est.)	43,220	▼	−3.2%
US Decennial Census; 1790–1960 1900–1990; 1990–2000 2010–2013

=== 2020 census ===
As of the 2020 census, the county had a population of 44,630. The median age was 45.9 years. 21.3% of residents were under the age of 18 and 23.6% of residents were 65 years of age or older. For every 100 females there were 94.3 males, and for every 100 females age 18 and over there were 91.9 males age 18 and over.

The racial makeup of the county was 80.5% White, 10.0% Black or African American, 0.3% American Indian and Alaska Native, 0.7% Asian, <0.1% Native Hawaiian and Pacific Islander, 2.0% from some other race, and 6.6% from two or more races. Hispanic or Latino residents of any race comprised 5.1% of the population.

54.1% of residents lived in urban areas, while 45.9% lived in rural areas.

There were 19,184 households in the county, of which 25.1% had children under the age of 18 living in them. Of all households, 45.2% were married-couple households, 19.4% were households with a male householder and no spouse or partner present, and 28.2% were households with a female householder and no spouse or partner present. About 32.5% of all households were made up of individuals and 15.5% had someone living alone who was 65 years of age or older.

There were 21,369 housing units, of which 10.2% were vacant. Among occupied housing units, 70.4% were owner-occupied and 29.6% were renter-occupied. The homeowner vacancy rate was 2.0% and the rental vacancy rate was 9.9%.

=== Racial and ethnic composition ===
Stephenson County, Illinois – Racial and ethnic composition Note: the US Census treats Hispanic/Latino as an ethnic category. This table excludes Latinos from the racial categories and assigns them to a separate category. Hispanics/Latinos may be of any race.
Race / Ethnicity (NH = Non-Hispanic)	Pop 1980	Pop 1990	Pop 2000	Pop 2010	Pop 2020	% 1980	% 1990	% 2000	% 2010	% 2020
White alone (NH)	46,344	44,320	43,404	40,612	35,405	93.56%	92.23%	88.62%	85.12%	79.33%
Black or African American alone (NH)	2,699	3,069	3,732	4,226	4,374	5.45%	6.39%	7.62%	8.86%	9.80%
Native American or Alaska Native alone (NH)	40	52	63	68	80	0.08%	0.11%	0.13%	0.14%	0.18%
Asian alone (NH)	138	303	332	295	306	0.28%	0.63%	0.68%	0.62%	0.69%
Native Hawaiian or Pacific Islander alone (NH)	x	x	14	13	11	x	x	0.03%	0.03%	0.02%
Other race alone (NH)	70	25	35	44	155	0.14%	0.05%	0.07%	0.09%	0.35%
Mixed race or Multiracial (NH)	x	x	652	1,047	2,045	x	x	1.33%	2.19%	4.58%
Hispanic or Latino (any race)	245	283	747	1,406	2,254	0.49%	0.59%	1.53%	2.95%	5.05%
Total	49,536	48,052	48,979	47,711	44,630	100.00%	100.00%	100.00%	100.00%	100.00%

=== 2010 census ===
Of the 19,845 households, 28.6% had children under the age of 18 living with them, 50.3% were married couples living together, 11.2% had a female householder with no husband present, 34.4% were non-families, and 29.7% of all households were made up of individuals. The average household size was 2.36 and the average family size was 2.90. The median age was 43.1 years.

The median income for a household in the county was $43,304 and the median income for a family was $54,224. Males had a median income of $41,672 versus $29,510 for females. The per capita income for the county was $22,608. About 12.3% of families and 14.8% of the population were below the poverty line, including 24.1% of those under age 18 and 7.3% of those age 65 or over.

As of the 2010 United States census, there were 47,711 people, 19,845 households, and 13,015 families residing in the county. The population density was 84.5 inhabitants per square mile (32.6/km^{2}). There were 22,081 housing units at an average density of 39.1 per square mile (15.1/km^{2}). The racial makeup of the county was 86.5% white, 9.0% black or African American, 0.6% Asian, 0.2% American Indian, 1.2% from other races, and 2.5% from two or more races. Those of Hispanic or Latino origin made up 2.9% of the population. In terms of ancestry, 46.6% were German, 12.5% were Irish, 10.0% were English, and 8.0% were American.

== Education ==
School districts include, no matter how much or little territory they have in the county, even if their schools are in other counties:

- Dakota Community Unit School District 201
- Durand Community Unit School District 322
- Eastland Community Unit School District 308
- Forrestville Valley Community Unit School District 221
- Freeport School District 145
- Lena-Winslow Community Unit School District 202
- Orangeville Community Unit School District 203
- Pearl City Community Unit School District 200
- Pecatonica Community Unit School District 321
- Warren Community Unit School District 205
- Winnebago Community Unit School District 323

There are five public high schools and one private high school in the county: (approximate enrollment included)

Public high schools

- Freeport High 1,254
- Lena-Winslow High 299
- Dakota High 254
- Pearl City High 150
- Orangeville High 142

Private high school

- Aquin Catholic High 93

== Communities ==
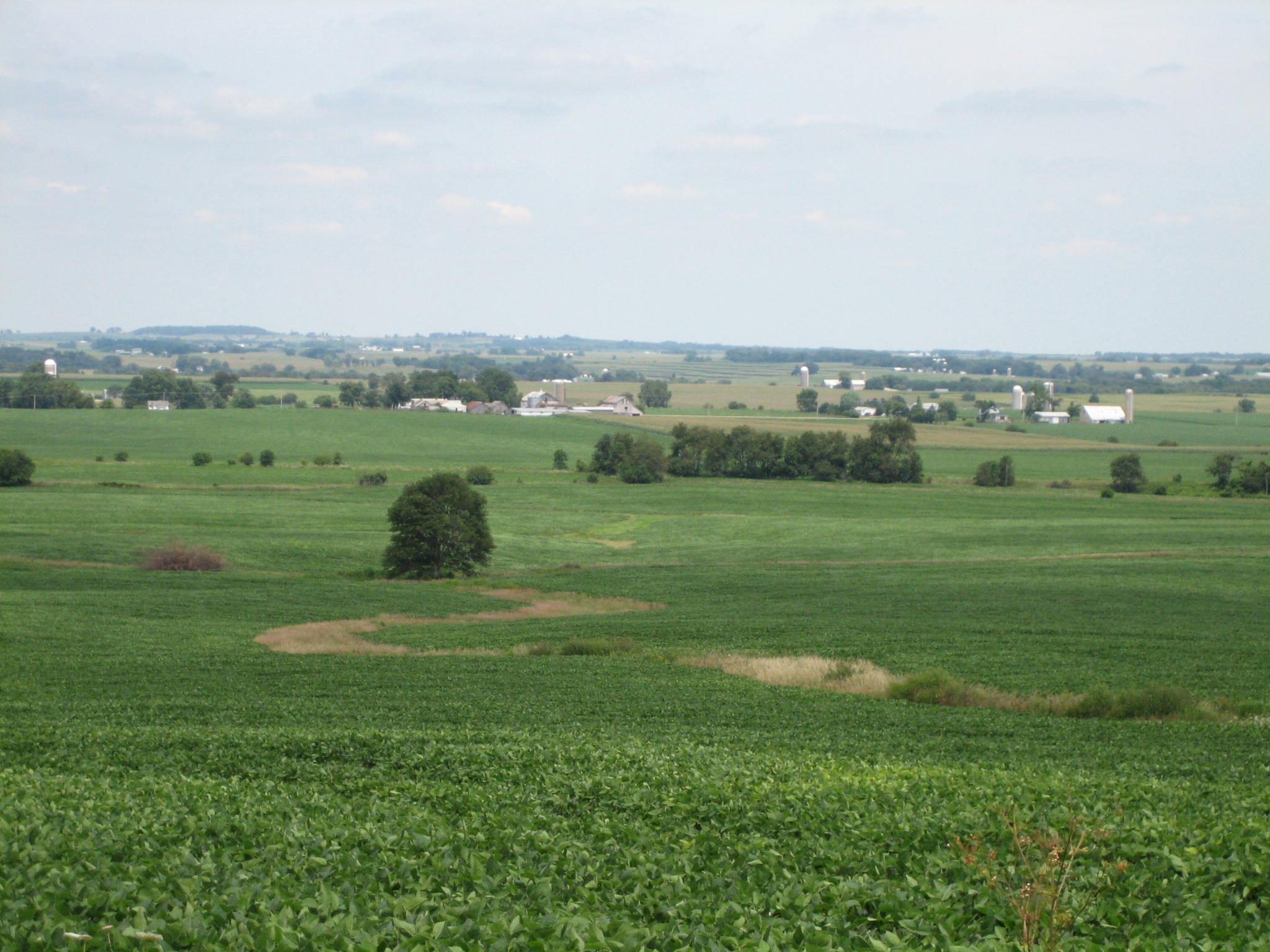
A northerly look across Stephenson County's western edge from an overlook near Kent

=== City ===
- Freeport

=== Villages ===
- Cedarville
- Dakota
- Davis
- German Valley
- Lena
- Orangeville
- Pearl City
- Ridott
- Rock City
- Winslow

=== Census-designated places ===
- Baileyville (part)
- Lake Summerset
- Willow Lake

=== Unincorporated communities ===
- Afolkey
- Bolton
- Buckhorn Corners
- Buena Vista
- Damascus
- Eleroy
- Evarts
- Florence
- Kent
- Loran
- McConnell
- Oneco
- Red Oak
- Rock Grove
- Scioto Mills
- Waddams Grove
- Winneshiek
- Yellow Creek

=== Townships ===
- Buckeye
- Dakota
- Erin
- Florence
- Freeport
- Harlem
- Jefferson
- Kent
- Lancaster
- Loran
- Oneco
- Ridott
- Rock Grove
- Rock Run
- Silver Creek
- Waddams
- West Point
- Winslow

=== Historic Sites ===
- Kellogg's Grove

== Politics ==
United States presidential election results for Stephenson County, Illinois
Year	Republican		Democratic		Third party(ies)	
Year	No.	%	No.	%	No.	%
1892	3,574	46.76%	3,717	48.63%	352	4.61%
1896	4,728	54.16%	3,776	43.26%	225	2.58%
1900	4,677	52.49%	3,983	44.70%	250	2.81%
1904	4,876	56.63%	3,275	38.03%	460	5.34%
1908	4,605	50.93%	4,076	45.08%	360	3.98%
1912	3,476	38.37%	3,850	42.49%	1,734	19.14%
1916	8,620	58.39%	5,463	37.00%	681	4.61%
1920	9,570	74.64%	2,772	21.62%	479	3.74%
1924	8,638	53.27%	2,452	15.12%	5,126	31.61%
1928	11,992	67.97%	5,579	31.62%	72	0.41%
1932	8,963	44.38%	10,728	53.11%	507	2.51%
1936	9,943	46.59%	10,567	49.51%	832	3.90%
1940	14,040	60.92%	8,911	38.67%	94	0.41%
1944	11,948	60.28%	7,755	39.13%	118	0.60%
1948	10,564	58.29%	7,409	40.88%	149	0.82%
1952	14,446	68.51%	6,605	31.32%	35	0.17%
1956	14,245	69.10%	6,349	30.80%	20	0.10%
1960	13,872	63.07%	8,055	36.62%	68	0.31%
1964	9,252	46.02%	10,854	53.98%	0	0.00%
1968	11,821	59.32%	7,040	35.33%	1,067	5.35%
1972	13,584	67.86%	6,404	31.99%	31	0.15%
1976	11,678	61.02%	7,192	37.58%	267	1.40%
1980	10,779	52.87%	6,195	30.39%	3,414	16.75%
1984	14,237	67.37%	6,723	31.82%	171	0.81%
1988	11,342	59.87%	7,460	39.38%	143	0.75%
1992	9,005	41.58%	7,899	36.47%	4,752	21.94%
1996	8,871	48.94%	7,145	39.42%	2,109	11.64%
2000	10,715	55.29%	8,062	41.60%	601	3.10%
2004	12,212	57.28%	8,913	41.81%	195	0.91%
2008	9,909	45.75%	11,349	52.40%	399	1.84%
2012	10,512	49.75%	10,165	48.11%	451	2.13%
2016	11,083	54.48%	7,768	38.19%	1,492	7.33%
2020	12,521	56.63%	9,055	40.95%	535	2.42%
2024	12,347	58.58%	8,278	39.28%	451	2.14%

== See also ==
- List of counties in Illinois
- List of Illinois county name etymologies
- National Register of Historic Places listings in Stephenson County, Illinois
