= Buckeye Township, Illinois =

Buckeye Township
- Township
- Location in Stephenson County
- Coordinates: 42°24′00″N 89°37′00″W
- Country: United States
- State: Illinois
- County: Stephenson

Government
  - Supervisor: Brad Cummins

Area
  - Total: 36.11 sq mi (93.5 km^{2})
  - Land: 36.11 sq mi (93.5 km^{2})
  - Water: 0 sq mi (0 km^{2}) 0%
- Elevation: 863 ft (263 m)

Population (2010)
  - Estimate (2016): 1,308
  - Density: 37.6/sq mi (14.5/km^{2})
- Time zone: UTC-6 (CST)
  - Summer (DST): UTC-5 (CDT)
- FIPS code: 17-177-09226

Buckeye Township is located in Stephenson County, Illinois. As of the 2010 census, its population was 1,359 and it contained 596 housing units. The communities of Cedarville, Red Oak, Buena Vista, Afolkey and Buckhorn Corners are located in the township.

== Geography ==
Buckeye is Township 28 North, Ranges 7 (part) and 8 (part) East of the Fourth Principal Meridian.

According to the 2010 census, the township has a total area of 36.11 square miles (93.5 km^{2}), all land.

== Demographics ==
Historical population
Census	Pop.	Note	%±
2016 (est.)	1,308
U.S. Decennial Census
