= Lancaster Township, Illinois =

Lancaster Township
- Township
- Location in Stephenson County
- Coordinates: 42°19′59″N 89°34′04″W
- Country: United States
- State: Illinois
- County: Stephenson

Government
  - Supervisor: Lowell Dickman

Area
  - Total: 32.08 sq mi (83.1 km^{2})
  - Land: 32.01 sq mi (82.9 km^{2})
  - Water: 0.07 sq mi (0.18 km^{2}) 0.22%
- Elevation: 860 ft (260 m)

Population (2010)
  - Estimate (2016): 1,529
  - Density: 49.6/sq mi (19.2/km^{2})
- Time zone: UTC-6 (CST)
  - Summer (DST): UTC-5 (CDT)
- FIPS code: 17-177-41885

Lancaster Township is located in Stephenson County, Illinois. As of the 2010 census, its population was 1,587 and it contained 692 housing units. It contains part of the census-designated place of Willow Lake.

== Geography ==
Lancaster is Township 27 North, Range 8 East of the Fourth Principal Meridian.

According to the 2010 census, the township has a total area of 32.08 square miles (83.1 km^{2}), of which 32.01 square miles (82.9 km^{2}) (or 99.78%) is land and 0.07 square miles (0.18 km^{2}) (or 0.22%) is water.

== Demographics ==
Historical population
Census	Pop.	Note	%±
2016 (est.)	1,529
U.S. Decennial Census
