= Harlem Township, Stephenson County, Illinois =

Harlem Township
- Township
- Location in Stephenson County
- Coordinates: 42°20′15″N 89°41′48″W
- Country: United States
- State: Illinois
- County: Stephenson

Government
  - Supervisor: Jerry Weber

Area
  - Total: 31.52 sq mi (81.6 km^{2})
  - Land: 31.42 sq mi (81.4 km^{2})
  - Water: 0.1 sq mi (0.26 km^{2}) 0.32%
- Elevation: 814 ft (248 m)

Population (2010)
  - Estimate (2016): 2,194
  - Density: 72.4/sq mi (28.0/km^{2})
- Time zone: UTC-6 (CST)
  - Summer (DST): UTC-5 (CDT)
- FIPS code: 17-177-32902

Harlem Township is located in Stephenson County, Illinois. As of the 2010 census, its population was 2,275 and it contained 981 housing units. It contains part of the census-designated place of Willow Lake.

== Geography ==
Harlem is Township 27 North, Range 7 East of the Fourth Principal Meridian.

According to the 2010 census, the township has a total area of 31.52 square miles (81.6 km^{2}), of which 31.42 square miles (81.4 km^{2}) (or 99.68%) is land and 0.1 square miles (0.26 km^{2}) (or 0.32%) is water.

=== Stagecoach inns ===
Tisdel Inn (Section 21) was built in 1852 by P.A. Tisdel along the Old State Road number 2, now Business U.S. Route 20. Frink, Walker & Company stage line, Chicago to Galena, used this road 1839 to 1854. The stone inn is now a residence.

== Demographics ==
Historical population
Census	Pop.	Note	%±
2016 (est.)	2,194
U.S. Decennial Census
