= Freeport High School (Illinois) =

Public secondary school in the United States

Location
- 701 West Moseley Street; Freeport, Illinois 61032; United States
- 42.2873°N 89.6288°W

Information
- School type: Public secondary
- School district: Freeport District 145 Schools
- Principal: Sarah Hasken
- Teaching staff: 88.74 (FTE)
- Grades: 9–12
- Gender: Coed
- Enrollment: 1,155 (2023-2024)
- Average class size: 15.7
- Student to teacher ratio: 13.02
- Campus type: Urban
- Colors: Orange; Black
- Slogan: You Can Eat Us, But You Can't Beat Us!
- Athletics conference: Northern Illinois Conference (NIC-10)
- Mascot: Pretzel
- Nickname: (Lady) Pretzels
- Newspaper: Pretz News
- Yearbook: Polaris
- Website: Official school website

Freeport High School is a public secondary school located in Freeport, Illinois, United States. It is a part of the Freeport School District 145.

The district includes Freeport, Cedarville, Ridott, and Willow Lake.

== Demographics ==
In the 2014–2015 school year, Freeport High School had a population of 55.2% white students, followed by 23.7% black students, 10.7% students of two or more races, 8.7% Hispanic students, and 1.6% of students grouped as "other" (Asian, American Indian, etc.). In the same year, 63.7% of the student body was classified as "low income".

== Academics ==
In 2015, Freeport had an average composite ACT score of 19.3, just below the state average at 20.5. It graduated 82.5% of its senior class. Freeport has not made Adequate Yearly Progress (AYP) in recent years, and, as of the 2013–2014 school year, has been on the state academic watch list for eight consecutive school years. The school has been well below the state minimum AYP target in math, reading, and graduation rate.

== Activities ==
The following teams won their respective IHSA sponsored state championship tournaments:

- Basketball (boys): State Champions (1914–15, 1925–26, 1950–51)
- Bowling (boys): State Champions (2007–08)
- Speech: State Champions (1940–41, 1941–42, 1948–49, 1949–50, 1950–51, 1955–56)
- Drama: State Champions (1940–41, 1942–43, 1948–49, 1950–51, 1955–56)
- Debate: State Champions (1949–50, 1955–56)

== Notable alumni ==
- Dan Balz, journalist for the Washington Post
- Richard Wayne Dirksen, Fourth Organist Choirmaster of Washington National Cathedral
- Kim Hughes, ABA/NBA basketball player
- Keondre Jackson, NFL safety for the Baltimore Ravens
- Robert L. Johnson, former CEO, Chairman, founder of Black Entertainment Television (BET)
- Scot McKnight, New Testament scholar
- Trisha Paytas, YouTube personality
- Jason Pearson, MLB baseball player
- Preston Pearson, played 14 years in the National Football League

== Notable staff ==
- Adolph Rupp was the boys' basketball coach (1926–30). He left to coach at the University of Kentucky (1930–72), leading the Wildcats to four NCAA Men's National Championships in his Hall of Fame career.
