= Machesney =

Machesney may refer to:

- Machesney Park, Illinois, a village in Winnebago County, Illinois, United States
- Machesney Airport, a former airport in Machesney Park, Illinois

== People with the surname ==
- Daren Machesney (born 1986), Canadian ice hockey player
