= Tinker Swiss Cottage =

Historic house in Illinois, United States

- U.S. National Register of Historic Places
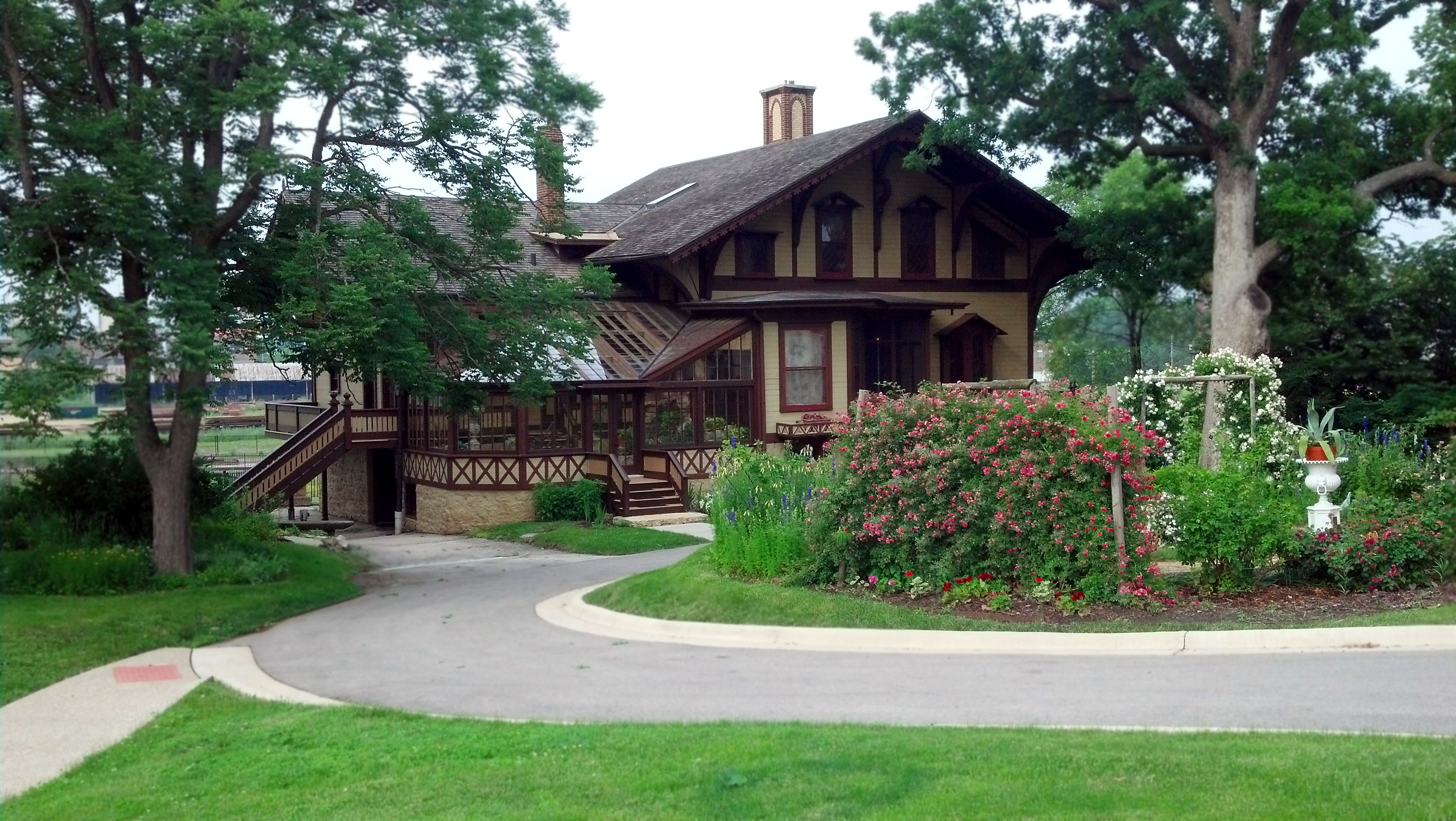

- Location within Illinois
- Location: 411 Kent Street, Rockford, Illinois
- Coordinates: 42°15′55″N 89°6′7″W
- Built: 1870
- Website: Official website
- NRHP reference No.: 72000468
- Added to NRHP: December 27, 1972

The Tinker Swiss Cottage is a historic house museum and park in Rockford, Illinois, United States. It was built as a personal residence by Robert Hall Tinker between 1865 and 1870. It is now a popular destination for school groups, general tours, and for rentals.

== History ==
Robert Hall Tinker was born on December 31, 1836, in Honolulu to missionary parents, the Reverend Reuben Tinker (1799–1854) and his wife Mary Throop Wood Tinker (1809–1895). Tinker moved to Rockford in 1856, where he was employed as an accountant by Mary Dorr Manny, the wealthy widow of John H. Manny of the Manny Reaper Works.

Robert Tinker traveled extensively throughout Europe in 1862 and was greatly impressed by the estates and gardens he had seen there. On his return to Rockford, Tinker built himself a 27-room, two-storey Swiss-style cottage on a limestone bluff overlooking Kent Creek. In 1870 Robert and Mary were married, becoming one of Rockford's most influential couples. Tinker was mayor of Rockford in 1875, a founding member of the Rockford Park District and the CEO of the Northwest and I.C. Rail lines.

Mary Dorr Manny Tinker died in 1901 and Robert remarried her niece Jessie Dorr Hurd Tinker. His second wife adopted a son, Theodore "Teddy" Tinker in 1908. Upon Robert Tinker's death in 1924, Jessie created a partnership with the Rockford Park District, allowing her to remain in the house until her death. After her death in 1942 the Rockford Park District acquired the property and opened the home as a museum in 1943.

== Features ==
The home was listed on the National Register of Historic Places (NRHP) on December 27, 1972.

Most striking is the interior for its dimensions including the high ceilings, angled roof, and unique designs in many of the first floor rooms. Many elements of the house were created or inspired by the ideas of Tinker, including the walnut spiral staircase which Robert himself made out of a single piece of wood and the rooms with rounded corners. The museum contains all the original objects belonging to the family, from furniture and artwork, to clothing and diaries.

== Media ==
Tinker Swiss Cottage was featured on season 8, episode 20 of Ghost Hunters, and offers monthly paranormal tours.
