= Harlem High School =

Harlem High School may refer to:

- Harlem High School (Georgia)
- Harlem High School (Illinois)
