= PMP-Paper Machinery Producer =

- Industry: Paper products
- Founded: 1854
- Headquarters: Jelenia Góra, Poland

PMP (Paper Machinery Producer) is a global provider of tissue, paper board technology. PMP is a medium size Polish-American Corporation, supporting the paper industry for over 160 years. The headquarters (PMPoland S.A.) is located in Jelenia Góra, Poland.

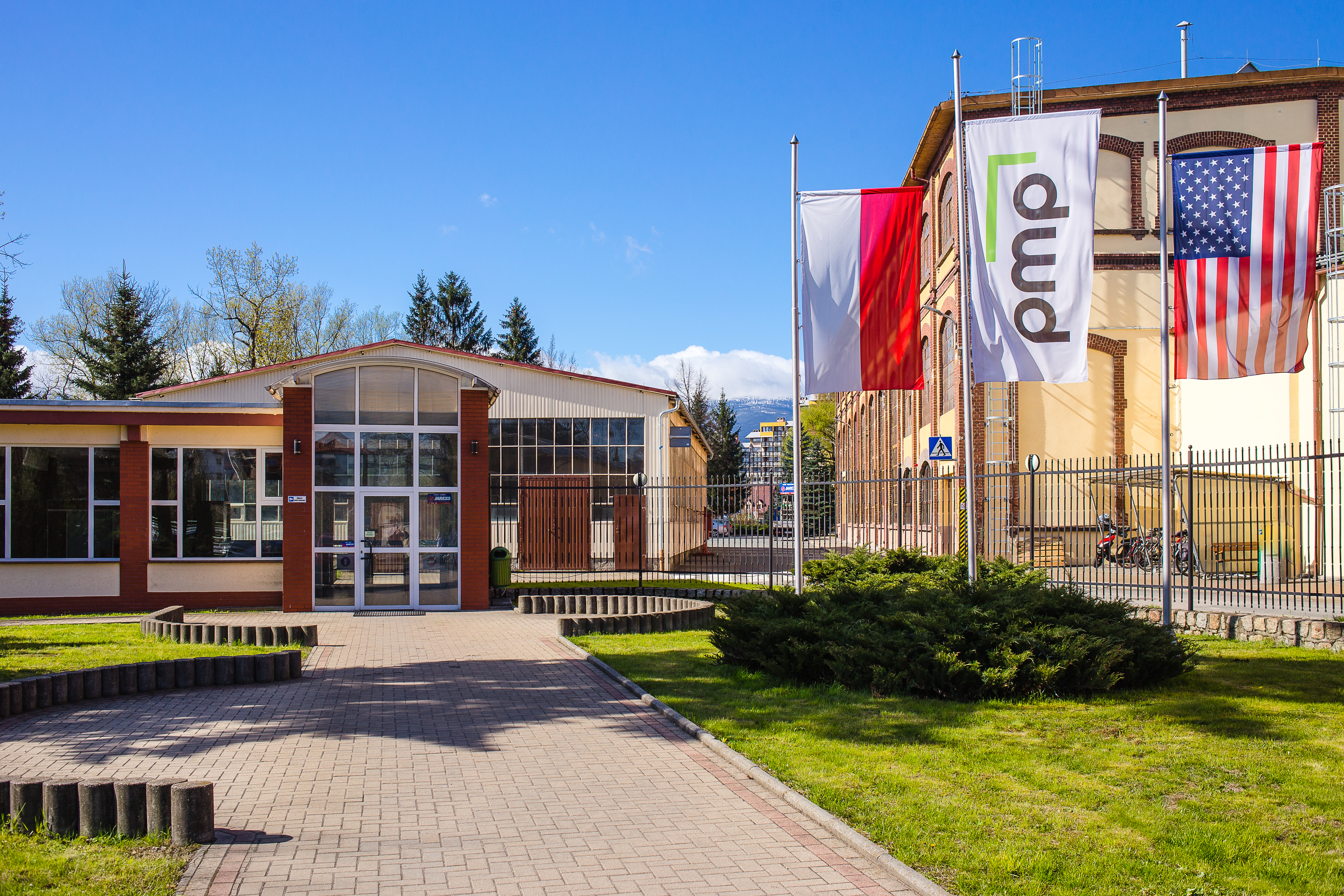
PMP headquarters in Jelenia Gora

== History ==
History of paper production in the neighbourhood of Jelenia Góra was started in the second half of the 19th century because of good water conditions. Mountain rivers could supply clean water for the technological processes and propel paper machines. Well Woody conditions in the neighbourhood became essential raw materials for the paper making. That was the main reason for the paper industry development in this area – huge amount of paper mills.

Heinrich Füllner decided to take advantage of the situations and established in 1854, a workshop for paper machines in Cieplice (now it is district of Jelenia Góra). After Heinrich Füllner death his son Eugen Füllner contributed to the development of the company. Even before World War II company changed several times the owner.

After World War II when Lower Silesia went to Polish borders, productions of paper machines was still continued. Paper Machinery Factory Fampa - state-owned company has started since 1945. Activity of Fampa can be divided into three main periods:

- 1945-1950 - starting up the business;
- 1950-1964 - first paper machines building based on documentation and knowledge of engineers from company before World War II and from own experience;
- 1964-1990 - paper machines building based on the licensee agreement with British-American company Walmsleys - Beloit was at that time the biggest corporation in the world specializing in the manufacturing of paper machinery.

Thanks to licensee agreement all the equipment manufactured by Beloit could also be built by Fampa. It was a direct result of a great technical progress made by the Polish company.

In 1990, with the changing of the political system, was transformed Fampa into a private company by the government and to obtain funds for the development and modernization.

The investor has become Beloit and company named Beloit Poland S.A. In the 1990s the company had a reputation in the business as specialist of manufacturing tissue machines. Beloit Poland S.A. produced also hydraulic headboxes and reels.

In 2000 extremely difficult period for Beloit's Corporation started and finally the company went into bankruptcy. Managers from Poland and investor from the United States took over Beloit Poland and created a company named PMPoland S.A. During the first supervisory board, a new management board was elected with Mr. Zbigniew Manugiewicz as the General Manager. Since year 2017 Mirosław Pietraszek has become a new president of PMPoland S.A.

Now PMPoland employs more than 650 employees in Poland, China and United States.

== PMP Divisions ==
- PMPoland S.A. (Jelenia Góra, Poland) - PMP headquarters, technology development, P&P capital project execution, marketing, application/ sales, designing, engineering, erection services, field services, service center for Europe;
- PMP Financial Center (Jelenia Góra, Poland) - financial services for PMP Group, IT support, HR policy;
- PMP Americas Inc. (Machesney Park, USA) - liaison for PMP P&P business, gauging & fixturing, subcontract manufacturing, service center for North America;
- PMP IB Machinery and Technology Co. Ltd. (Changzhou, China) - center of excellence for EcoEc tissue machines, engineering & manufacturing support for capital projects, service center for Asia);
- PMP Rolls & Service (Świecie, Poland) - roll manufacturing, roll services, refurbishment services, maintenance services;
- PMPower S.r.l. (Lucca, Italy) - energy solutions for PMs/ TMs, hoods/steam and condensate systems, ventilation and air systems, plant surveys and upgrading solutions;
- PMPKonmet Sp. z.o.o. (Jelenia Góra, Poland) - subcontracting projects, mild steel structures.
