= Irish Marching Society =

The Irish Marching Society (IMS) was founded in 1979 by a group of individuals who wanted to come together to celebrate the Irish Heritage in the city of Rockford, Illinois. This organization plan and stage, with the help and support of the city of Rockford, the annual St. Patrick's Day Parade. They also hold an annual St. Patrick's Day Party. The group, known as IMS Unit 1, is located in that city.

The first party was originally planned for a small Rockford Faust Hotel meeting room, but as word spread of the celebration, the party was moved to the Grand Ballroom. By 1984, the party had outgrown the Faust Hotel, and it was held in the Forest Hills Lodge. The party then moved to the Armory on North Main Street where it continued to grow in popularity. The largest estimated attendance was in 1991 when over 7,500 members, both IMS members as well as some non-members and their children. With the closing of the Armory, the party was moved around the downtown area - the Ing Skating Palace in 2002 and the Lyran Singing Society in 2003. In 2009 the party was held at the Cliffbreakers Restaurant in North Rockford.

The first parade was held in 1980 in downtown Rockford and the tradition has continued along various routes over the years. The parade includes not only members and their families, but also bag pipe bands, high school bands, floats, various government officials, including in one year a U.S. Vice President, various animals including an elephant & birds of prey, color guards, various beauty pageant winners and participants and, of course, clowns.

The IMS was founded to help preserve and celebrate the Irish heritage however membership is opened to person of all ethnic heritages. All event proceeds are contributed back to the community to various charities, with a total over $40,000 as of 2005.

All the parade and party organizing, as well as planning and executing is performed entirely by volunteers.
