= Harlem School District 122 =

School district in Winnebago County, Illinois, United States

Harlem School District No. 122

Address
- 8605 N. Second St., Machesney Park, Illinois 61115 United States
- Coordinates: 42°20′51″N 89°02′55″W

District information
- Type: Unit school district ("Old Type")
- Grades: Pre-K-12
- Established: April 1910
- NCES District ID: 1718240

Other information
- Illinois RCDTS Code: 04-101-1220-22
- Website: Official website

Harlem School District No. 122, commonly called Harlem Consolidated School District, is a unit school district in eastern Winnebago County, Illinois. It is headquartered in Machesney Park, and covers much of Loves Park, most of Machesney Park, southern Roscoe, and parts of Rockford.

As of July 2026, the district has:

- 1 Pre-K/kindergarten: Parker Early Education Center)
- 6 elementary schools: Loves Park Elementary, Machesney Elementary, Marquette Elementary, Ralston Elementary, Rock Cut Elementary, and Windsor Elementary
- 1 middle school: Harlem Middle School
- 1 high school: Harlem High School

== History ==
=== Old school districts ===
Schools that were closed when Harlem Consolidated was formed include Lovejoy School (District No. 49) in Harlem Township.

Harlem Village School District No. 55 operated the Harlem Village School. The schoolhouse, later Harlem Township Hall, was torn down some time after July 1989.

=== Harlem Consolidated School District ===
Harlem Consolidated School District No. 122 was formed in April 1910.

The Harlem Consolidated School, on the corner of Harlem Road and North Second Street, was completed on March 6, 1911, at a cost of $17,700; was dedicated on April 26, 1911, and also opened in 1911.

Loves Park Grade School was built in 1916 at 344 Grand Avenue in Loves Park.
