= Klehm Arboretum and Botanic Garden =

Nonprofit arboretum and botanical garden in Rockford, Illinois

Coordinates: 42.2446°N 89.1124°W

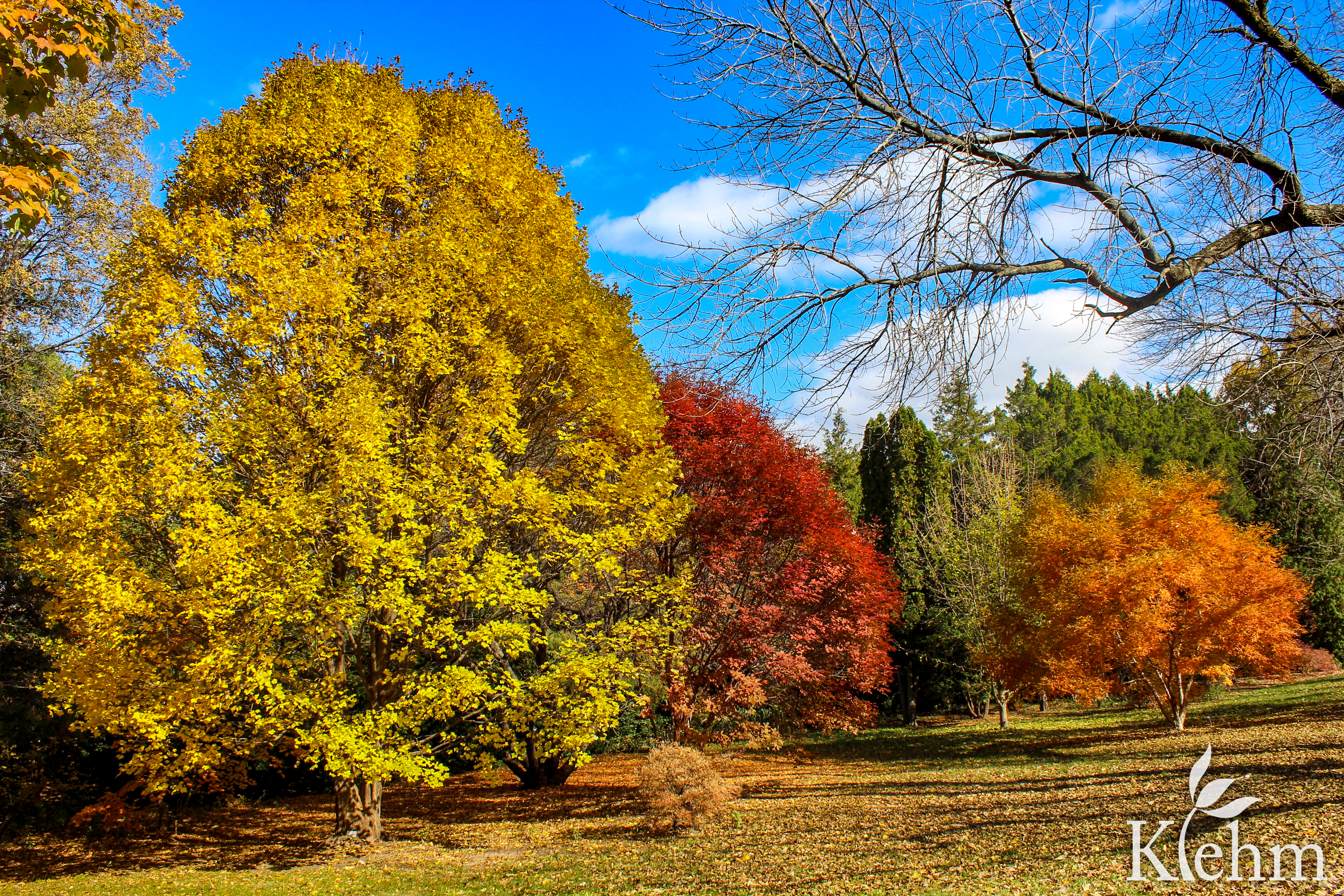
- Fall colors at Klehm Arboretum & Botanic Garden in Rockford, Illinois
- Interactive map of Klehm Arboretum and Botanic Garden
- Location: 2715 South Main Street, Rockford, Illinois
- Area: 155 acres (63 ha)
- Created: 1910
- Founder: William Lincoln Taylor
- Website: Klehm.org

Klehm Arboretum & Botanic Garden (155 acres (63 ha)) is a nonprofit arboretum and botanical garden located at 2715 South Main Street, Rockford, Illinois.

The arboretum was established in 1910 as Rockford Nursery by landscape architect William Lincoln Taylor, who planted many of the arboretum's trees. The Klehm family purchased the nursery in 1968 and maintained it until 1985, when they donated the property to the Winnebago County Forest Preserve District as an arboretum. In the early 1990s, the site was inventoried, a master plan developed, and a capital campaign undertaken. Garden plantings began in 1994.

The arboretum includes a pre-settlement Bur Oak grove (5 ha / 12 acres) whose largest trees are estimated to be over 300 years old. It also includes over 50 species and cultivars of Conifers, representing nine groups from North America, Europe, and Asia, such as Firs, Junipers, Spruces, Pines, Douglas Fir, Yews, Arborvitae, Hemlock, Nikko Firs, Meyer's Spruce, Common Juniper, Arborvitae, and the Threadleaf Sawara Falsecypress.

The European collection includes mature Norway Maple, Field Maple, Pedunculate Oak, English elm, European beech, Common Horsechestnut, Mountain Pine and Scots Pine, as well as European Larch, European Hornbeam and Spindle Tree. The East Asian collection includes Cork Trees, Japanese Red and White Magnolia, Flowering Quince, and various Honeysuckles. The Northern America collection includes American Beech, Yellow Buckeye, Cucumbertree Magnolia, Tulip Tree, Ponderosa Pine, Colorado Spruce, and Douglas Fir.

Other woody plants include Basswood, Red Buckeye, Black Cherry, American Chestnut, Dogwood, Fringe Tree, Hackberry, Hemiptelea, Japanese Pagoda Tree, Shagbark Hickory, Umbrella Magnolia, Scarlet Oak, White Oak, Redbud, Carolina Silverbell, Sourwood, sweetgum, Viburnum, Black Walnut, and Wisteria.

The gardens include a Butterfly Garden, Daylily Garden, multiple Demonstration Gardens, Fountain Garden, Grass Garden, Hosta Garden, the Nancy Olson Children's Garden, the Ethel Johnson Lilac Garden, and a Prehistoric Garden (with Cycads, Baldcypress, Ferns, Ginkgo, Horsetails, Mosses, Bristlecone Pine, and Dawn Redwood).

== See also ==
- List of botanical gardens in the United States
