= Rockford Pro-Am Golf Tournament =

The Rockford Pro-Am Golf Tournament, also known as the Rockford ProAm, was a one-day golf tournament in Rockford, Illinois that paired professional golfers with amateur teams to raise funds for charitable organizations. In 1990, its 14th edition brought together 21 professionals from the PGA Tour and Senior PGA Tour with amateurs. It was normally held in July following the John Deere Classic.

Past participants included Arnold Palmer, Bob Hope, Kenny Perry, Fred Couples, John Daly, Hale Irwin, Matt Kuchar, Zach Johnson and Stacy Lewis, among others.

== History ==
The pro-am was started as a fundraiser for the three Rockford-area hospitals in 1977 — Rockford Memorial Hospital, St. Anthony Hospital and SwedishAmerican Hospital. By 1990, the 14th annual event had raised more than $650,000 for local hospitals and service organizations. Its proceeds that year were designated for the three hospitals, the Barbara Olson School of Hope, Contact Rockford and the Saint Elizabeth Community Center.

The 1990 field included 21 professionals from the PGA Tour and Senior PGA Tour, who played with amateurs.

The tournament was initially hosted by Rockford Country Club. Its 30th edition, in 2006, was held at Forest Hills Country Club. For its 39th annual event in 2015, the tournament returned to Rockford Country Club. Organizers said future events would rotate at least between Rockford Country Club and Forest Hills, with Aldeen Golf Club and Mauh-Nah-Tee-See Country Club also under consideration.

Many celebrities and professional golfers have come to the event. For a few years in the early 1980s, comedian and ultimate golf enthusiast Bob Hope would come to entertain at a benefit gala at the then-newly opened MetroCentre then play in the pro-am the next day. Other entertainers who participated included Hope's long-time friend and fellow comedian George Burns and the star of TV's Wonder Woman Lynda Carter.

In September 2022, organizers announced that future Rockford Pro-Am tournaments would be discontinued after a 43-year run, explaining that they could no longer afford to finance professional golfers' appearances.
