= Machesney Park Mall =

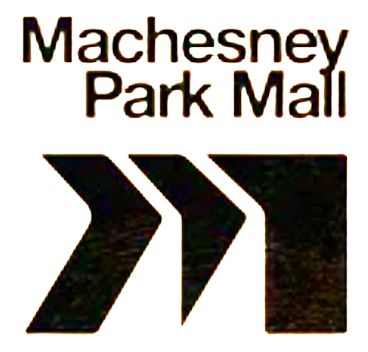
- Machesney Park Mall logo in the 1980s
- Location: Machesney Park, Illinois, United States
- Coordinates: 42.349644°N 89.049072°W
- Address: 8750 North Second Street (Illinois Route 251)
- Opened: 1978
- Closed: 2008
- Developer: Melvin Simon and Associates
- Owner: Rubloff Development Group, Inc.
- Num. of anchor tenants: 0 (4 at peak)
- Floor area: 229,988 square feet (21,366.6 m^{2})
- Floors: 1
- Public transit: Rockford Mass Transit District

Machesney Park Mall was a shopping mall in Machesney Park, Illinois, a village in the Rockford, Illinois metropolitan area. Developed by Melvin Simon and Associates (now Simon Property Group) on the site of the former Machesney Airport, the mall declined steadily from the 1990s onward as anchor tenants closed or relocated. By 2008, its enclosed portion had closed; the site was later redeveloped as an open-air shopping plaza anchored by Burlington Coat Factory and Big Lots. That effort largely failed: Big Lots closed in 2024 amid bankruptcy, and Burlington Coat Factory relocated in 2025, leaving the site without retailers.

== History ==
The mall was built on part of the site of the former Machesney Airport, which closed in 1974, by Melvin Simon and Associates (now Simon Property Group). It opened in 1978 with the original anchor stores being: JCPenney (which later became a JCPenney Outlet Store) and H. C. Prange. Shortly after the mall's opening, Kohl's and Prange Way were added as anchor stores.

In 1990, Prange Way closed, and was replaced by Phar-Mor. Phar-Mor later became another store known as Seventh Avenue Direct.

In 1992, H. C. Prange was acquired by Iowa-based Younkers. At the end of 1996, following its acquisition, Younkers closed both of its stores in the Rockford area, as they were both replaced by Bergner's.

Kohl's and Seventh Avenue Direct closed at some point in the 2000s; the exact year is unknown. In 2007, Kohl's opened a location a few miles away.

By 2008, the enclosed portion of the mall was closed and became open for redevelopment. All anchor tenants continued operation.

A Burlington Coat Factory store opened at the site of the former mall in September 2009. This store had no mall entrance and was constructed as a whole separate store at the former mall site. A few years later, a Big Lots store opened next door to join Burlington Coat Factory.

In December 2013, the JCPenney Outlet Store closed as part of a plan to close all Outlet Stores.

On October 11, 2016, The Bon-Ton Stores announced that the Bergner's location would be closing on January 31, 2017.

In 2023, A Nestory Park Self Storage moved to the Former Bergner's.

In 2024, the Big Lots store at the former mall closed along with all other Big Lots stores as a result of bankruptcy, stemming from declining sales, high inflation, and increased competition. With Big Lots' closure, Burlington Coat Factory remained as the mall's only retailer. In January 2025, it was announced that the Burlington store would be moving out of the mall site to a nearby shopping center, moving to 1524 W. Lane Road in a space formerly occupied by an Office Depot store. This move left the former mall with no retailers, leaving it mostly vacant.

== Renovations ==
Since being acquired by Rubloff Development Group in December 2003, the mall has been undergoing internal demolition in preparation for redevelopment. Practice Velocity, a medical software and billing company, moved into the former Kohl's in late 2013. On July 18, 2018, it was announced that PCI Pharma Services would move into the vacant JCPenney store.
