= Faust Landmark =

Coordinates: 42.2670°N 89.0848°W

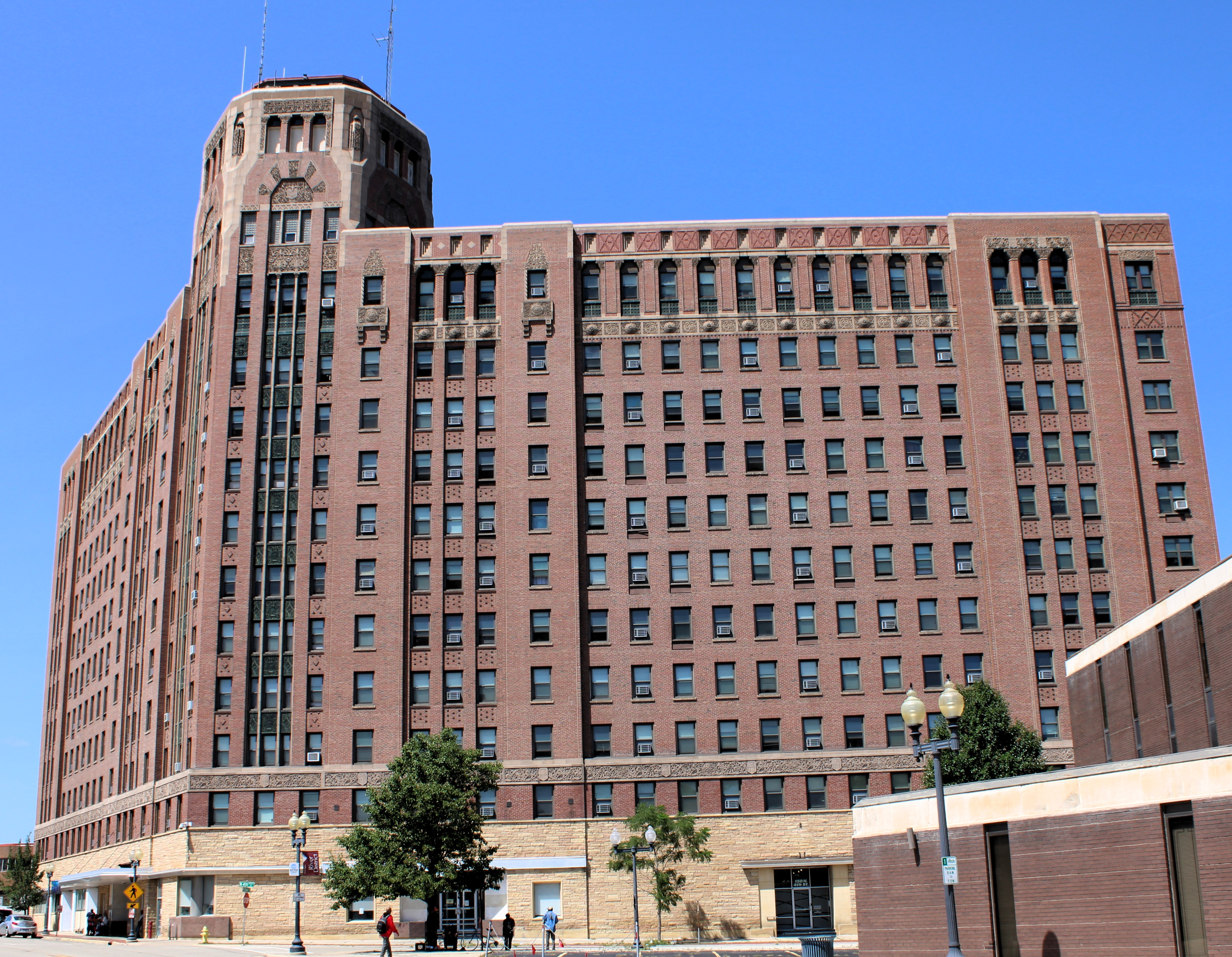
- Faust Landmark in 2023
- Interactive map of the Faust Landmark area
- Former names: Faust Hotel; Tebala Towers

General information
- Type: Apartment building Hotel (1929-1980)
- Completed: 1929

Height
- Height: 186 feet (57 m)

Technical details
- Floor count: 15

Other information
- Public transit: RMTD

The Faust Landmark, formerly known as the Faust Hotel (or Hotel Faust) and Tebala Towers, is located on East State Street, is one of the largest buildings in downtown Rockford, Illinois, United States. It currently serves persons 55 years and older. Built in 1929 as a hotel, it was sold to the Shriners who renamed it Tebala Towers. It was renamed to its current name when sold by the Shriners and was renovated into one and two bedroom efficiency apartments.

== Description ==
A Historic Landmark, the Faust is 15 stories tall (186 ft., 57 m) and is capped by a flagpole over the penthouse with a large U.S. flag that flies 24 hours a day. The "Faust" is still Rockford's tallest building. Before 1980 the hotel was also adorned with a set of large red neon letters in a double row that proclaimed Faust Hotel and later, Tebala Towers on the north top side and the east top side of the building. In the early 1980s a fierce windstorm knocked down some of the letters, damaging the building and putting pedestrians & residents at risk. All of these letters were taken down shortly after this incident. Plans to place a large replica of a 'Fez' Cap over the penthouse, at the base of the flagpole, were abandoned as impractical.

== History ==
At the end of World War II, during VJ day, the center for much of the celebration in Rockford took place in the area of the Faust hotel and the nearby Midway theater. In its heyday, the Faust was known as the premier hotel for Rockford, hosting such dignitaries as President Dwight D. Eisenhower and the 1960 Democratic Presidential candidate John F. Kennedy, as well as one of the Kings of Sweden during a visit to the Swedish community located in Rockford. Prince Bertil, Duke of Halland, third son of Gustaf VI Adolf of Sweden, was the guest of honor at a banquet held at the Faust Hotel in 1938. His younger brother Prince Carl Johan Bernadotte Count Wisborg often stayed at the hotel during business trips in his involvement with the Sundstrand Corporation, but was embarrassed by a Bernadotte Suite decorated for him with royal crowns and the Swedish colors of blue and yellow.

== Attribution ==
The Faust was named for Levin Faust, a Swedish immigrant and industrialist who came to Rockford in the late 19th century and also helped organize what is now known as the Rockford Park District.
