= Rockford, Illinois =

Rockford
- City
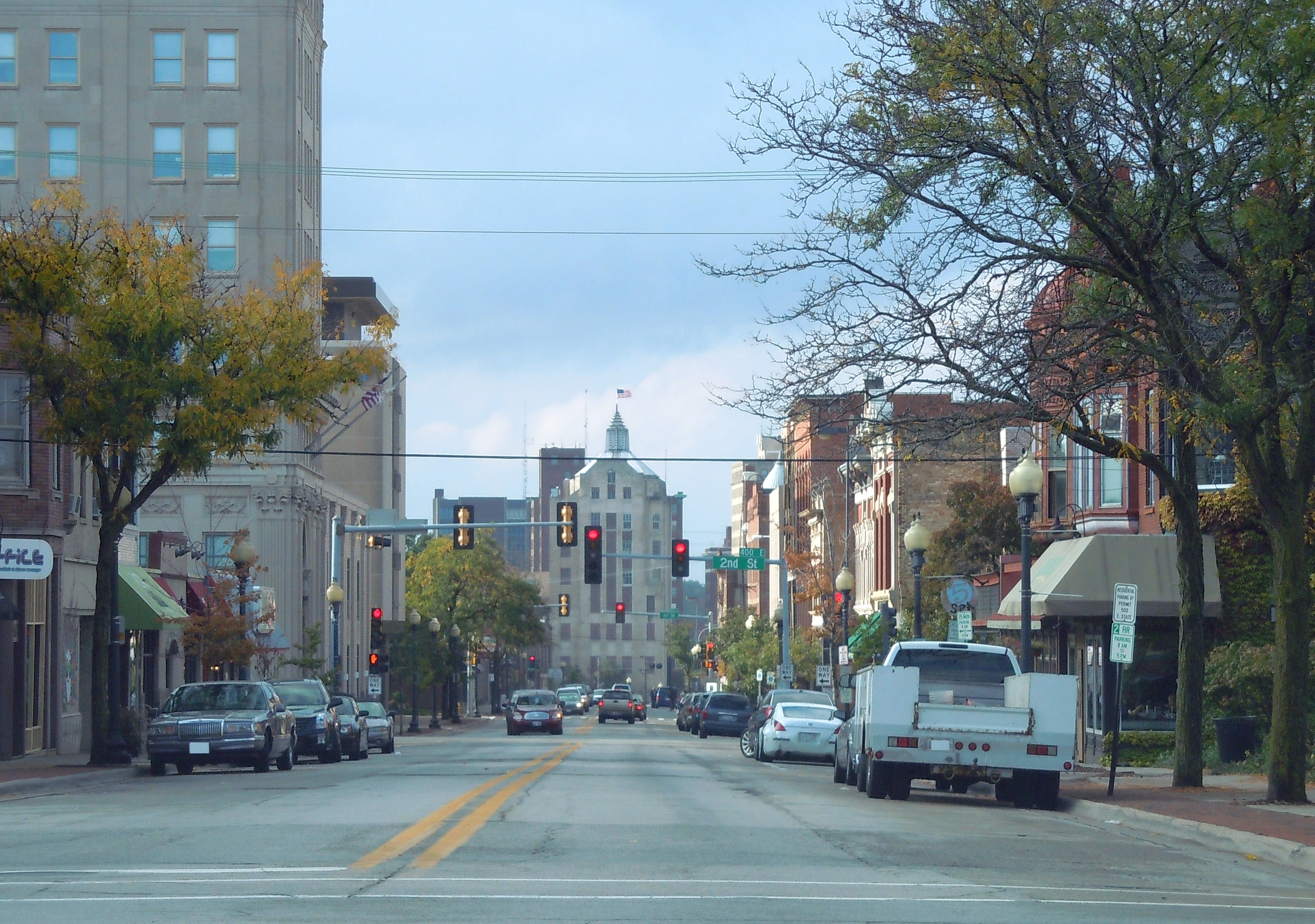
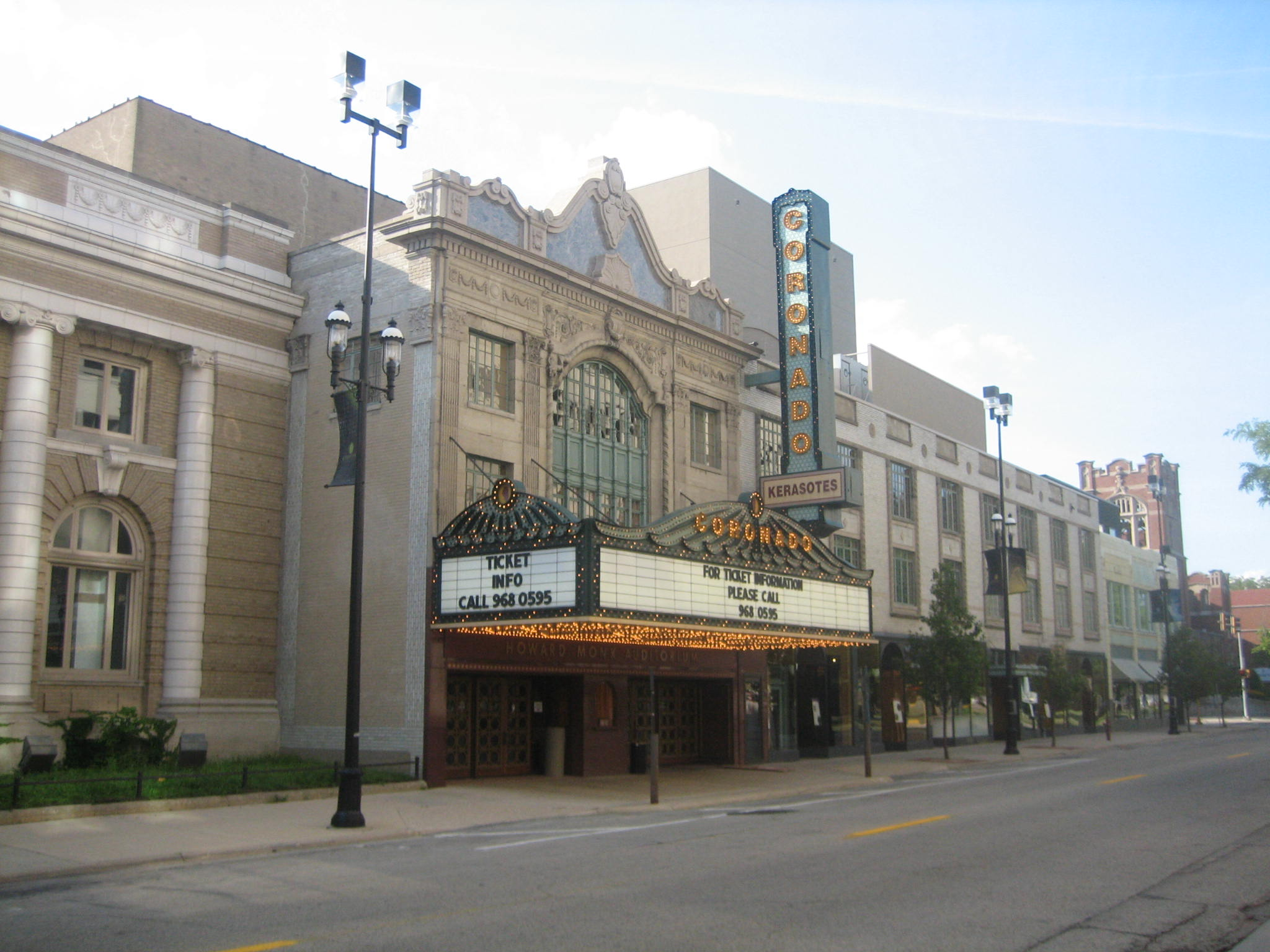
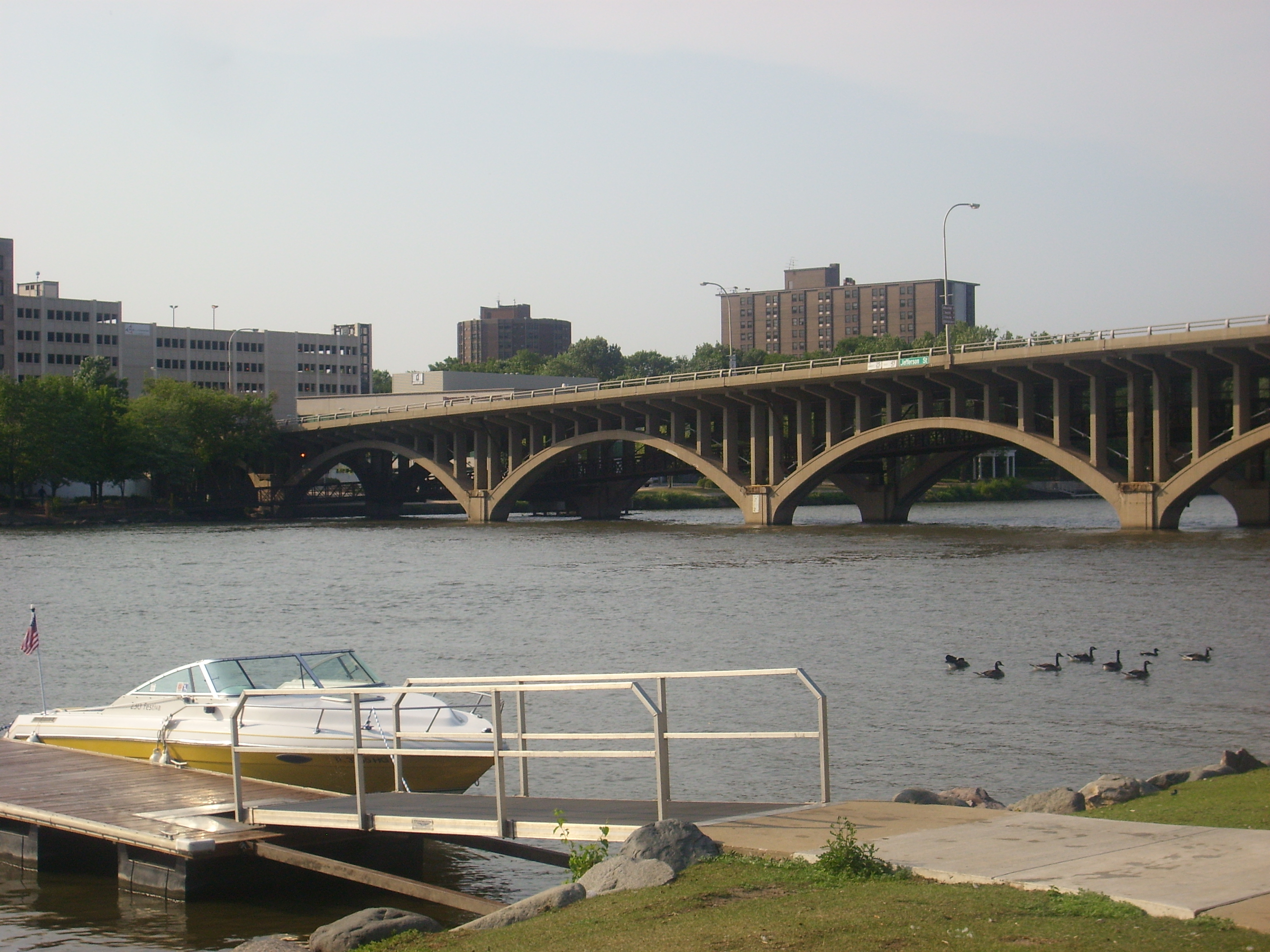
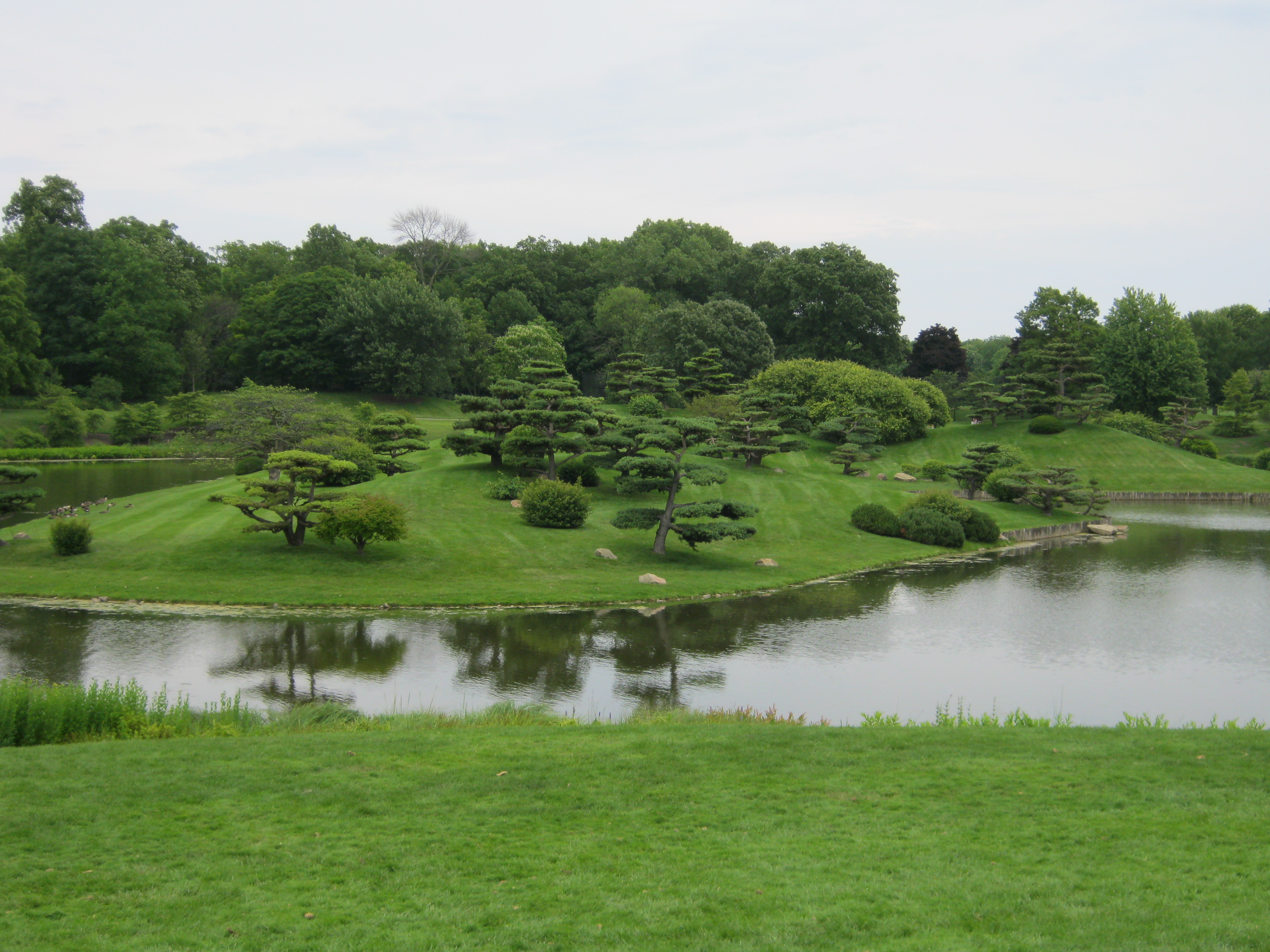
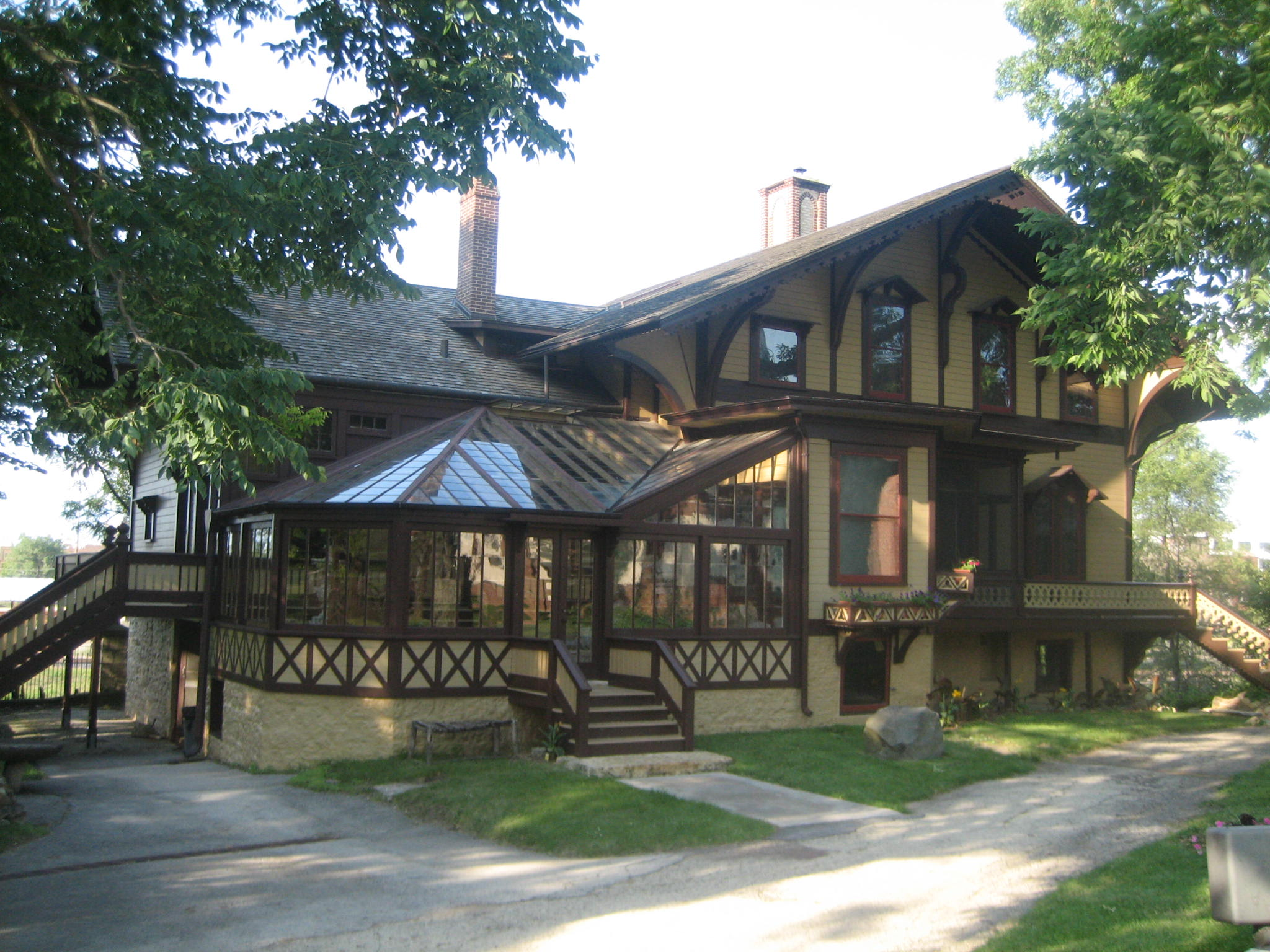
- West Downtown Rockford Historic District Coronado Theatre Rock River Anderson Japanese Gardens Tinker Swiss Cottage

- Flag Seal Wordmark
- Nicknames: The Forest City, The Screw Capital of the World, Screw City, Fastener Capital of the World, Reaper City
- Motto: "The Government Closest to the People"
- Interactive map of Rockford
- Location within Illinois Location within the United States
- Coordinates: 42°15′34″N 89°03′52″W
- Country: United States
- State: Illinois
- Counties: Winnebago, Ogle
- Townships: Burritt (Winnebago), Cherry Valley (Winnebago), Owen (Winnebago), Rockford (Winnebago), Winnebago (Winnebago), Scott (Ogle)
- Incorporated: 1839 (as a town); January 3, 1852 (as a city)

Government
  - Type: Mayor-council government
  - Mayor: Janessa Neal (D) (Acting)

Area
  - City: 65.92 sq mi (170.74 km^{2})
  - Land: 64.91 sq mi (168.11 km^{2})
  - Water: 1.02 sq mi (2.63 km^{2})
- Elevation: 728 ft (222 m)

Population (2020)
  - City: 148,655
  - Estimate (2024): 147,486 ▼
  - Rank: 185th in the United States; 5th in Illinois
  - Density: 2,290.2/sq mi (884.27/km^{2})
  - Urban: 276,443 (US: 148th)
  - Urban density: 2,066/sq mi (797.6/km^{2})
  - Metro: 337,103 (US: 160th)
- Demonym: Rockfordian

GDP
  - Metro: $18.129 billion (2022)
- Time zone: UTC−6 (CST)
  - Summer (DST): UTC−5 (CDT)
- ZIP Codes: 61101–61110, 61112, 61114, 61125, 61126
- Area codes: 815 and 779
- FIPS code: 17-65000
- GNIS feature ID: 2396405
- Website: rockfordil.gov

Rockford is a city in Winnebago and Ogle counties in the U.S. state of Illinois. It is located in far northern Illinois on the banks of the Rock River. It is the fifth-most populous city in Illinois, with a population of 148,655 at the 2020 census. The Rockford metropolitan area has an estimated 337,000 residents. Rockford is the county seat of Winnebago County and the most populous city in Illinois outside the Chicago metropolitan area.

Rockford was settled as Midway in the mid-1830s due to its location roughly equidistant between Lake Michigan and the Mississippi River. The city became notable in the 19th and early 20th centuries for its production of heavy machinery and furniture, but like other Rust Belt cities, Rockford experienced significant industrial decline in the late 20th century. Since the late 1990s, Rockford has pursued economic diversification in the automotive and healthcare industries, as well as downtown revitalization and tourism initiatives.

Nicknamed "the Forest City" for its heavily forested residential neighborhoods, Rockford is home to historical and cultural sites including the Anderson Japanese Gardens, Klehm Arboretum, Tinker Swiss Cottage, the BMO Harris Bank Center, the Coronado Theatre, the Laurent House, and the Burpee Museum of Natural History. Its contributions to music are noted in the Mendelssohn Club, and performers such as Cheap Trick and Phantom Regiment Drum and Bugle Corps.

== History ==
=== Settlement and development ===
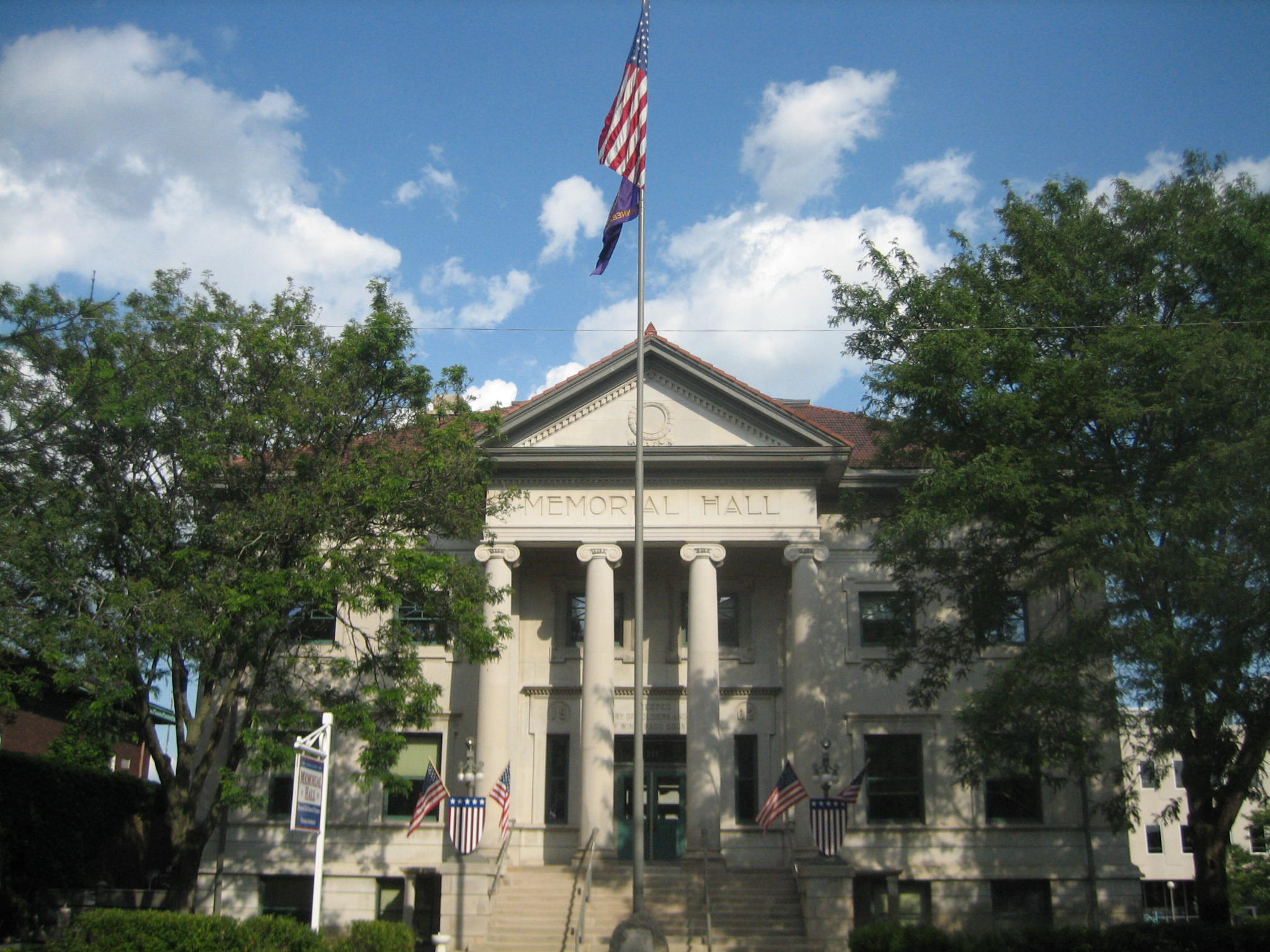
Winnebago County War Memorial

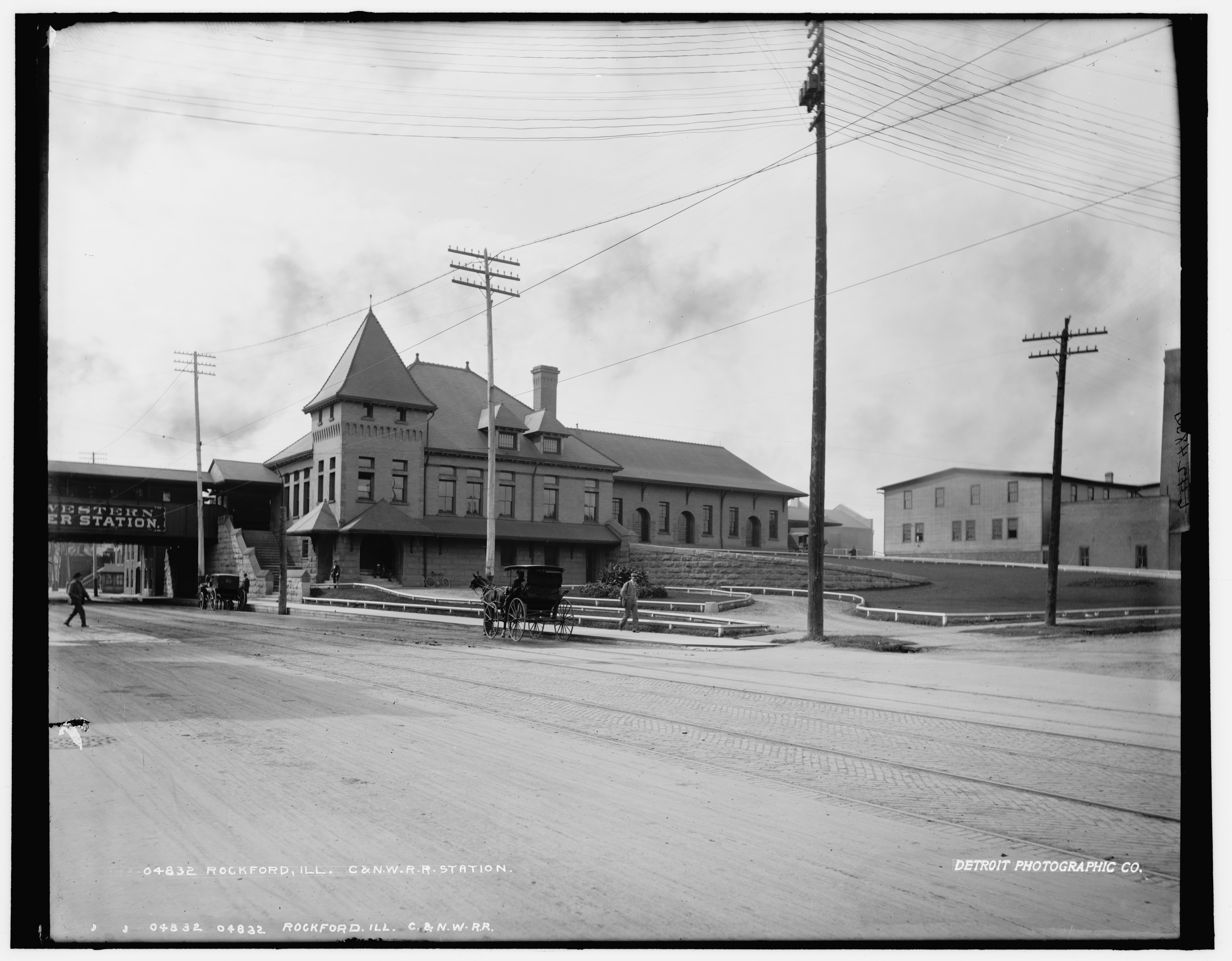
Rockford Station, circa 1890

Rockford traces its roots to 1834, as the combined settlements of Midway were founded on both banks of the Rock River. On the west bank, Germanicus Kent and Thatcher Blake (with his slave Lewis Lemon) founded Kentville; the east bank was settled by Daniel Shaw Haight. With the location of the Rock River equidistant between Lake Michigan and the Mississippi River, the combined settlement derived the name "Midway". In 1836, Winnebago County was created (from both Jo Daviess and LaSalle counties), with Midway named as its county seat, as it was "halfway between Galena and Chicago on a line of four-horse coaches."

In 1837, the village of Midway was renamed Rockford, highlighting a rocky river ford across the Rock River in the village. In the same year, Rockford established its first post office, with Daniel Shaw Haight as the first postmaster. In 1840, the first weekly newspaper began circulation. In 1847, Rockford Female Seminary – today Rockford University – was founded. On January 3, 1852, Rockford was officially chartered as a city; a year later the long-running "Forest City" nickname first appeared, used by the New York Tribune. Also in 1852, the Galena and Chicago Union Railroad connected Rockford to Chicago by railroad.

At the time of its founding, many of the village's residents were transplants from the Northeastern United States and upstate New York. Descended from English Puritans, the Midway/Rockford population was similar to much of the rest of northern Illinois and nearly all of Wisconsin during the mid-19th century. After the Black Hawk War, additional immigrants moved to northern Illinois; during the 1830s and 1840s, Rockford and Winnebago County were considered a cultural extension of New England.

During the antebellum period, Rockford shared abolitionist leanings, lending considerable support to the Free Soil Party and the later Republican Party. In 1848, 42 percent of voters in Winnebago County (where Rockford dominated as the county seat) voted for Martin Van Buren. In 1852, Free Soil candidate John P. Hale became the first presidential candidate to visit Rockford, although he would only receive 28 percent of the vote. In 1860, Abraham Lincoln won 3,985 votes in Winnebago County to the 817 votes of Stephen A. Douglas.

The 1850s brought industry that would change Rockford forever. In 1853, inventor John Henry Manny moved to Rockford to produce horse-drawn mechanical reapers for farmers and transport the finished products by rail. Chicago implement manufacturer Cyrus McCormick (whose company became International Harvester) took Manny to court after he produced nearly 6,000 machines; Manny would prevail on both judgement and an appeal. Along with the production of agricultural machines, Swedish furniture cooperatives established the city as a manufacturing base. The Rockford Union Furniture Company, under John Erlander, spearheaded these cooperatives. Today, Erlander's home is a Rockford museum that shows his efforts in elevating Rockford to second in furniture manufacturing in the United States, behind Grand Rapids.

During the Civil War, one of the first Illinois regiments to be mobilized, the Zouaves, were from Rockford. The city also served as the site for Camp Fuller, a training site for four other infantry regiments.

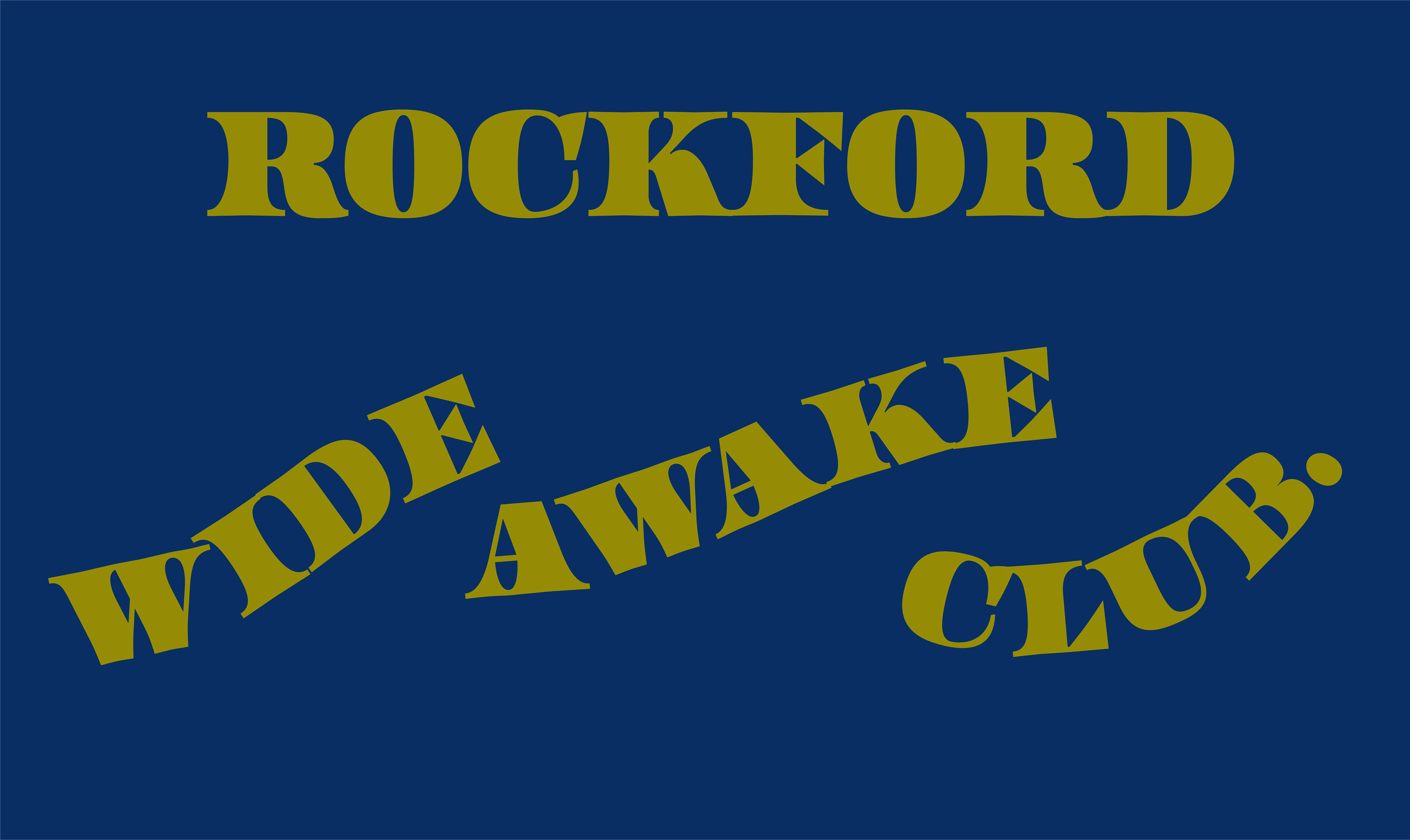
Digital remake of the flag Carried by the Zouaves during the Civil War

In 1884, Rockford established its first city-wide public school district, constructing Rockford Central High School in 1885; following the construction of the high school, the district began construction of brick multi-story multigrade school buildings across the city.

The Rockford Female Seminary became the alma mater of Jane Addams in 1881. The move accompanied the Seminary's transition into a more complete curriculum, which was represented by its renaming to Rockford College in 1892. Culture flourished with the founding of the Mendelssohn Club in 1884, which became the oldest operating music club in the United States. It was complemented by the construction of a Carnegie library in 1902, which became the first building of Rockford's public library system. 1903 saw the dedication of the Winnebago County Veterans Memorial Hall in the presence of sitting President Theodore Roosevelt. Roosevelt returned to Rockford during his campaign in 1912 and again to address the soldiers at Camp Grant, a training site for World War I soldiers.

=== 20th century ===
John F. Kennedy campaigning and driving through State Street in downtown Rockford, 1960

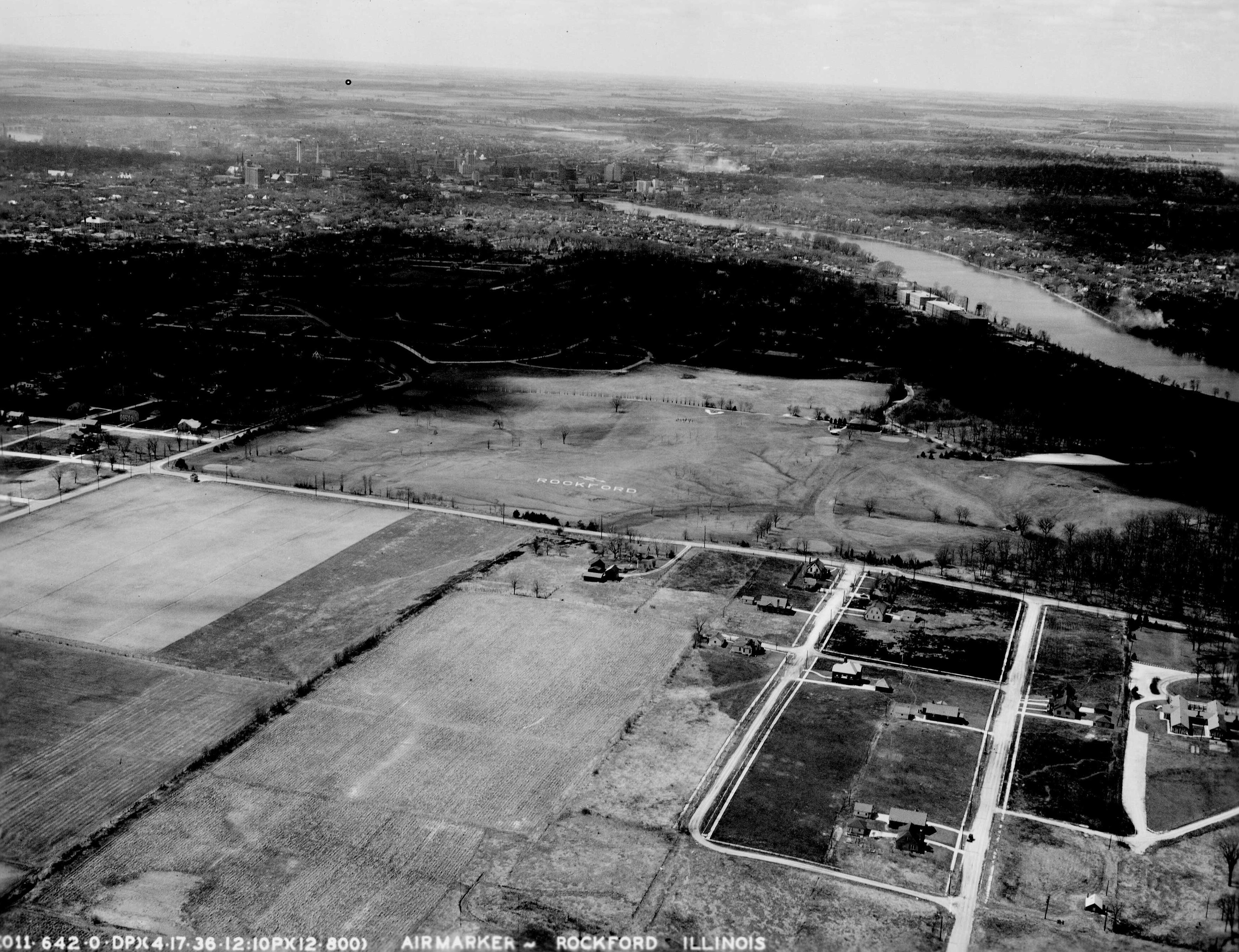
Rockford in 1936

The twentieth century saw demographic changes to Rockford. An influx of Italians, Poles, Lithuanians, and African Americans replaced the previously dominant Irish and Swedes. The city was also no stranger to contemporary political issues. Electorally divided between wets and drys on the subject of prohibition, Rockford featured a coalition of labor unionists and socialists that elected numerous aldermen and carried 25 to 40 percent in mayoral elections. During World War I, an antiwar protest by the Industrial Workers of the World led to 118 arrests. In 1920, the city was a target of the Palmer Raids. While its congressional district favored Republicans, Rockford continuously elected former socialists as mayor between 1921 and 1955.

One of its contemporary attractions, the Coronado Theatre, opened in 1927. Noted for its atmospheric styling, the Coronado rivaled its counterparts in Chicago and was added to the National Register of Historic Places in 1979. Camp Grant was turned over to the Illinois National Guard. During World War II, it reopened as an induction center and POW detention camp. The USS Rockford, a Tacoma-class frigate named for the city, was commissioned in March 1944 and earned two service stars.

In the September 1949 issue of Life magazine, postwar Rockford was described as "nearly typical of the U.S. as any city can be." Due to this archetypal nature, sociologists like W. Lloyd Warner warned of the necessity to "understand the realities of their system." In the late 1950s, Rockford lost over 50,000 trees to Dutch elm disease, thinning the tree canopy of the "Forest City" for decades.

From 1955 to 1965, several events would take place that would shape the development of Rockford into the 21st century. In 1956, construction was approved for a four-lane US 20 bypass; along with shifting truck traffic away from the downtown routing of the highway, the bypass established much of the southern border of the city (which remains to this day). In 1958, Interstate 90 was completed in Illinois, becoming the Northwest Tollway; in a decision that would change Rockford forever, the interstate highway was not routed through the city, but near the Winnebago-Boone county line, with the eastern terminus of the US 20 bypass in Cherry Valley.

In 1963, the Rockford area was selected by Chrysler Corporation to construct an assembly plant; the final site of what is now the Belvidere Assembly Plant is southwest of Belvidere, between US 20 and Interstate 90. While not located directly in the city, the Chrysler assembly plant has served as one of the largest employers of the region since its 1965 opening.

The growth of Rockford led to many changes to its educational systems. In 1955, Rockford College – now Rockford University – became co-educational for the first time. Coinciding with the expansion of the student body, the college outgrew its near-east side campus in use since the 1840s. After the acquisition of land in 1957, construction began on its present-day campus location, opening in 1964. In 1964, Rock Valley College was founded as a two-year community college, with construction on its campus commencing in 1965.

Prior to the 1960s, neighborhood and economic growth in Rockford largely mirrored itself on both sides of the Rock River. As the 20th century progressed, growth in western Rockford (and established neighborhoods in eastern areas of the city) struggled to compete with economic development that moved further east. From the late 1950s, downtown Rockford (centered around the intersection of IL 2 and US 20; Main Street and West State Street) began to decline as the primary shopping district of the city. In 1956, North Towne Mall opened on the far northwest side of the city, with Colonial Village opening on the (then) far east side in 1962, both of which were partially enclosed (some stores had exterior entrances). In 1973, Cherryvale Mall was opened as the first fully enclosed shopping mall in the city; nearly 6 miles from the city center, the mall was located at the intersection of the US-20 bypass and the Northwest Tollway, sharing a city border with Cherry Valley.

While growth at the eastern end of Rockford undersaw favorable conditions for growth, established neighborhoods began to suffer irrevocable decline. In the 1970s, efforts commenced to revitalize downtown Rockford, once the primary shopping district. In a highly criticized decision, the city reconfigured several blocks of downtown into a pedestrian mall, closing off the Main Street/West State Street intersection to traffic. In 1975, what the local press characterized as one of the most well-known and haunting crimes took place when newspaper delivery boy Joey Didier was kidnapped and murdered by Robert Lower. In the late 1970s, Symbol, a 47-foot tall Alexander Liberman abstract sculpture was placed in the center of the pedestrian mall. In 1980, then Congressman John B. Anderson, representing the 16th Congressional District in Illinois which includes Rockford, ran for President of the United States. Further attracting commercial growth, the MetroCentre 10,000-seat multi-purpose arena, was opened in 1981.

Rockford was hit hard by the early 1980s recession and became one of the highest-unemployed cities in the United States. In 1981, rail service to the city ended as Amtrak ended the Dubuque-to-Chicago Black Hawk route. After struggling to compete with more modern facilities, the Coronado Theatre showed its last movie in 1984, shifting solely to stage performances. To expand passenger service, the Greater Rockford Airport rebuilt its passenger terminal in 1987, although the access of Rockford to the Northwest Tollway (to the much larger O'Hare Airport) became a popular alternative.

In a decision that continues to affect Rockford to the present day, in 1989, Rockford Public School District 205 closed several schools across the city in a cost-cutting decision. In the aftermath of the decision, the school district was found guilty in federal court of discrimination against minority students. From 1993 to 2001, the school district was under federal oversight to desegregate its schools, costing over $250 million.

=== 21st century ===
During the 2000s, a movement began to reverse urban blight of downtown Rockford, which had begun in the 1960s. After an 18-month multi-million dollar renovation and expansion, the Coronado Theatre was reopened in 2001. In 2008, the MetroCentre downtown arena completed a $20 million renovation (renamed the BMO Harris Bank Center in 2011). In 2009, the downtown pedestrian mall was removed as part of a street refurbishment project, restoring Main Street (Illinois Route 2) to two-lane traffic for the first time in nearly 45 years.

Prior to the onset of the Great Recession, housing in Rockford was affected by catastrophic weather events. In 2006 and 2007, Keith Creek underwent 100-year flooding events, damaging hundreds of older homes on the near east side of the city. In response, the city secured FEMA grants, demolishing over 100 homes; to reduce the severity of future flooding events, the creek is being reconstructed (through 2019) and left as greenspace. As an effect of the recession, by 2013, thirty-two percent of mortgages in the city were upside-down. While remaining the largest city in Illinois outside Chicago and its suburbs, estimated population decline from 2010 to 2017 led Rockford to be overtaken by Joliet and Naperville (the latter, slightly), effectively making it the fifth-largest city in Illinois.

From 2014 to 2018, the unemployment rate in Rockford has fallen from 12.9 percent to 4.4 percent (the lowest since 2000). While predominately a manufacturing community since World War II, Rockford has struggled to diversify its industrial base. Shifting from agricultural machinery and furniture, manufacturing in the city remains dominated by fasteners, automotive suppliers (representing FCA Belvidere Assembly), and the aerospace industry (Woodward and Collins Aerospace; the latter, tracing its roots to Sundstrand Corporation). In 2012, Woodward selected suburban Loves Park for a $200 million manufacturing campus toward its energy control and optimization systems. Boeing included Rockford in a list of five finalists to manufacture the 777X during union disputes in 2014. In 2016, AAR Corporation opened a MRO facility at the Rockford airport with a hangar large enough to fit a Boeing 747-8.

During the 2010s, all three major health care providers in Rockford underwent major expansions of their facilities. SwedishAmerican, in partnership with the University of Wisconsin Carbone Cancer Center, opened a $39 million Regional Cancer Center in 2013. In 2014, MercyHealth (based in Janesville, Wisconsin) acquired Rockford Health System, the operator of Rockford Memorial Hospital. In 2019, MercyHealth opened Javon Bea Hospital-Riverside (named after the MercyHealth CEO and its Riverside Boulevard/Interstate 90 location); its second hospital in Rockford, the $505 million complex was the largest construction project in the history of the city.

In July 2024, a 200-year flooding event overwhelmed the city's stormwater management systems, killing at least one.

== Geography ==
According to the 2010 census, Rockford has an area of 61.949 square miles (160.45 km^{2}), of which 61.08 square miles (158.20 km^{2}) (or 98.6%) is land and 0.869 square miles (2.25 km^{2}) (or 1.4%) is water. Located primarily in Winnebago County, a portion extends into neighboring Ogle County. Rockford is approximately 90 miles west-northwest of downtown Chicago, and 70 miles south-southeast of Madison.

=== Waterways ===
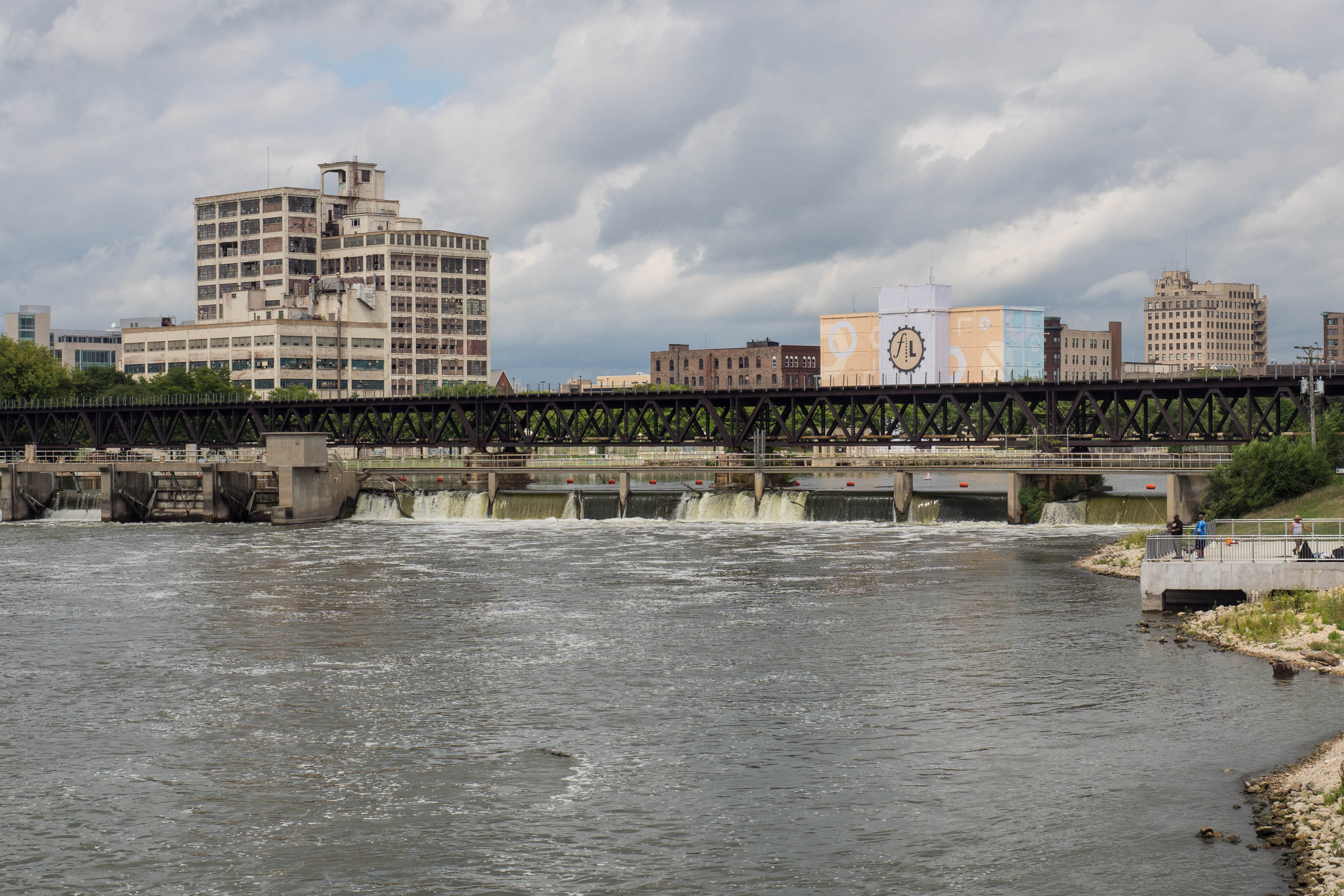
Fordham Dam across Rock River

The Rock River forms the traditional center of Rockford and is its most recognizable natural feature. One of its largest tributaries, the Kishwaukee River, joins the Rock River at the southern end of the city near the Rockford airport. Since the 1946 closure of Camp Grant, much of the length of Kishwaukee has been redeveloped into parkland and forest preserves, effectively forming the southern border of the city. Other waterways that feed into the Rock River include Spring Creek (northeast region), Keith Creek (east region), and Kent Creek (west region). Of the 8 Illinois dams of the Rock River, the Fordham dam is located south of downtown.

=== Climate ===
Summers are usually hot and humid with the average high temperature in July (the hottest month) being 83.9 °F (28.8 °C). The winter months can bring bitterly cold Arctic air masses. The average high temperature in January (the coldest month) is 29.1 °F (−1.6 °C). June is Rockford's wettest month while January is the driest. During a typical year, Rockford receives 37.24 in (946 mm) of precipitation.

Rockford and surrounding areas are prone to violent thunderstorms during March, April, May, and June. On April 21, 1967, a violent F4 tornado struck the neighboring town of Belvidere, killing twenty-four people and injuring hundreds more at Belvidere's High School. Other severe weather events, such as hail and strong winds are common in these storms. On July 5, 2003, at 04:13, a line of severe storms and their associated high winds caused widespread damage on both the east and west sides of Rockford. Approximately 70,000 people were without power, with many on the west side suffering in the heat without electricity for a week. It took months to clear the damage, but because the storm struck so early in the morning there were no injuries or fatalities. However, these sometimes violent storms bring the majority of summer rainfall.

The city is also prone to severe snowstorms in winter, and blizzards are frequent winter occurrences. On January 13, 1979, over 9 inches (23 cm) of snow fell on Rockford in just a few hours during one of the strongest blizzards in the city's history. The city averages approximately 36 inches (91.4 cm) of snowfall in a normal winter, but greater amounts are common. The snowiest winter in the history of the city was the winter of 1978–1979, when 74.5 inches (189 cm) of snow fell.

The record high temperature is 112 °F (44 °C), set on July 14, 1936 during the Dust Bowl, and the record low temperature is −31 °F (−35 °C), set on January 31, 2019.

Climate data for Rockford, Illinois (Chicago Rockford International Airport) 1991–2020 normals, extremes 1893–present
Month	Jan	Feb	Mar	Apr	May	Jun	Jul	Aug	Sep	Oct	Nov	Dec	Year
Record high °F (°C)	63 (17)	78 (26)	85 (29)	93 (34)	106 (41)	106 (41)	112 (44)	104 (40)	103 (39)	91 (33)	81 (27)	69 (21)	112 (44)
Mean maximum °F (°C)	49.7 (9.8)	53.7 (12.1)	70.2 (21.2)	80.8 (27.1)	88.0 (31.1)	92.7 (33.7)	93.4 (34.1)	92.4 (33.6)	89.6 (32.0)	82.3 (27.9)	66.7 (19.3)	53.9 (12.2)	95.4 (35.2)
Mean daily maximum °F (°C)	29.1 (−1.6)	33.4 (0.8)	46.5 (8.1)	59.7 (15.4)	71.2 (21.8)	80.7 (27.1)	83.9 (28.8)	82.0 (27.8)	75.3 (24.1)	62.3 (16.8)	47.1 (8.4)	34.3 (1.3)	58.8 (14.9)
Daily mean °F (°C)	21.8 (−5.7)	25.6 (−3.6)	37.3 (2.9)	49.1 (9.5)	60.4 (15.8)	70.1 (21.2)	73.8 (23.2)	71.9 (22.2)	64.4 (18.0)	52.0 (11.1)	38.8 (3.8)	27.3 (−2.6)	49.4 (9.7)
Mean daily minimum °F (°C)	14.5 (−9.7)	17.8 (−7.9)	28.1 (−2.2)	38.5 (3.6)	49.5 (9.7)	59.6 (15.3)	63.6 (17.6)	61.8 (16.6)	53.5 (11.9)	41.8 (5.4)	30.5 (−0.8)	20.2 (−6.6)	40.0 (4.4)
Mean minimum °F (°C)	−9.6 (−23.1)	−3.8 (−19.9)	8.4 (−13.1)	23.5 (−4.7)	34.3 (1.3)	46.2 (7.9)	52.8 (11.6)	51.3 (10.7)	38.0 (3.3)	26.1 (−3.3)	13.8 (−10.1)	−1.2 (−18.4)	−13.9 (−25.5)
Record low °F (°C)	−31 (−35)	−25 (−32)	−11 (−24)	5 (−15)	24 (−4)	35 (2)	43 (6)	35 (2)	24 (−4)	7 (−14)	−10 (−23)	−24 (−31)	−31 (−35)
Average precipitation inches (mm)	1.60 (41)	1.63 (41)	2.40 (61)	3.75 (95)	4.18 (106)	5.23 (133)	3.81 (97)	4.19 (106)	3.62 (92)	2.63 (67)	2.27 (58)	1.93 (49)	37.24 (946)
Average snowfall inches (cm)	10.9 (28)	8.5 (22)	4.9 (12)	0.9 (2.3)	0.0 (0.0)	0.0 (0.0)	0.0 (0.0)	0.0 (0.0)	0.0 (0.0)	0.2 (0.51)	2.3 (5.8)	9.4 (24)	37.1 (94)
Average extreme snow depth inches (cm)	7.2 (18)	6.7 (17)	4.1 (10)	0.4 (1.0)	0.0 (0.0)	0.0 (0.0)	0.0 (0.0)	0.0 (0.0)	0.0 (0.0)	0.1 (0.25)	1.6 (4.1)	5.7 (14)	10.9 (28)
Average precipitation days (≥ 0.01 in)	10.1	8.7	10.8	11.8	12.9	11.4	9.1	9.3	8.4	9.6	8.8	9.8	120.7
Average snowy days (≥ 0.1 in)	8.2	6.5	3.9	0.9	0.0	0.0	0.0	0.0	0.0	0.2	1.6	6.8	28.1
Source: NOAA

== Demographics ==
Historical population
Census	Pop.	Note	%±
1860	6,979		—
1870	11,049		58.3%
1880	13,120		18.7%
1890	23,584		79.8%
1900	31,051		31.7%
1910	45,401		46.2%
1920	64,651		42.4%
1930	85,864		32.8%
1940	84,637		−1.4%
1950	92,927		9.8%
1960	126,706		36.4%
1970	147,370		16.3%
1980	139,712		−5.2%
1990	139,426		−0.2%
2000	150,115		7.7%
2010	152,871		1.8%
2020	148,655		−2.8%
2024 (est.)	147,486		−0.8%
U.S. Decennial Census; 2010 2020

=== Racial and ethnic composition ===
Rockford city, Illinois – Racial and ethnic composition Note: the US Census treats Hispanic/Latino as an ethnic category. This table excludes Latinos from the racial categories and assigns them to a separate category. Hispanics/Latinos may be of any race.
Race / Ethnicity (NH = Non-Hispanic)	Pop 2000	Pop 2010	Pop 2020	% 2000	% 2010	% 2020
White alone (NH)	102,678	89,349	72,440	68.40%	58.45%	48.73%
Black or African American alone (NH)	25,822	30,695	33,466	17.20%	20.08%	22.51%
Native American or Alaska Native alone (NH)	315	308	308	0.21%	0.20%	0.21%
Asian alone (NH)	3,256	4,390	5,145	2.17%	2.87%	3.46%
Pacific Islander alone (NH)	45	36	30	0.03%	0.02%	0.02%
Other race alone (NH)	171	218	715	0.11%	0.14%	0.48%
Mixed race or Multiracial (NH)	2,550	3,790	6,968	1.70%	2.48%	4.69%
Hispanic or Latino (any race)	15,278	24,085	29,583	10.18%	15.76%	19.90%
Total	150,115	152,871	148,655	100.00%	100.00%	100.00%

=== 2010 census ===
As of the 2010 census, there were 152,871 people and 66,700 households. Rockford is in the center of its namesake metropolitan area. The racial makeup of the city was 65.1% White (58.4% Non-Hispanic white), 20.5% African American, 0.4% Native American, 2.9% Asian, 0.01% Pacific Islander, 7.5% from other races, and 3.6% from two or more races. Hispanic or Latino residents of any race were 15.8% of the population.

The median income for a household in the city was $55,667, and the median income for a family was $65,465. Males had a median income of $37,098 versus $25,421 for females. The per capita income for the city was $19,781. 14.0% of the population and 10.5% of families were below the poverty line. 19.6% of those under the age of 18 and 8.0% of those 65 and older were living below the poverty line.

In the late 1950s, Rockford surpassed Peoria as the second largest city in Illinois by population, holding onto that position into the 21st century. In 2003, the status was changed as it was overtaken by Aurora after the results of a special census held by the latter city (as the two cities were not counted together, a direct comparison was not possible until the national census in 2010).

=== Religion ===
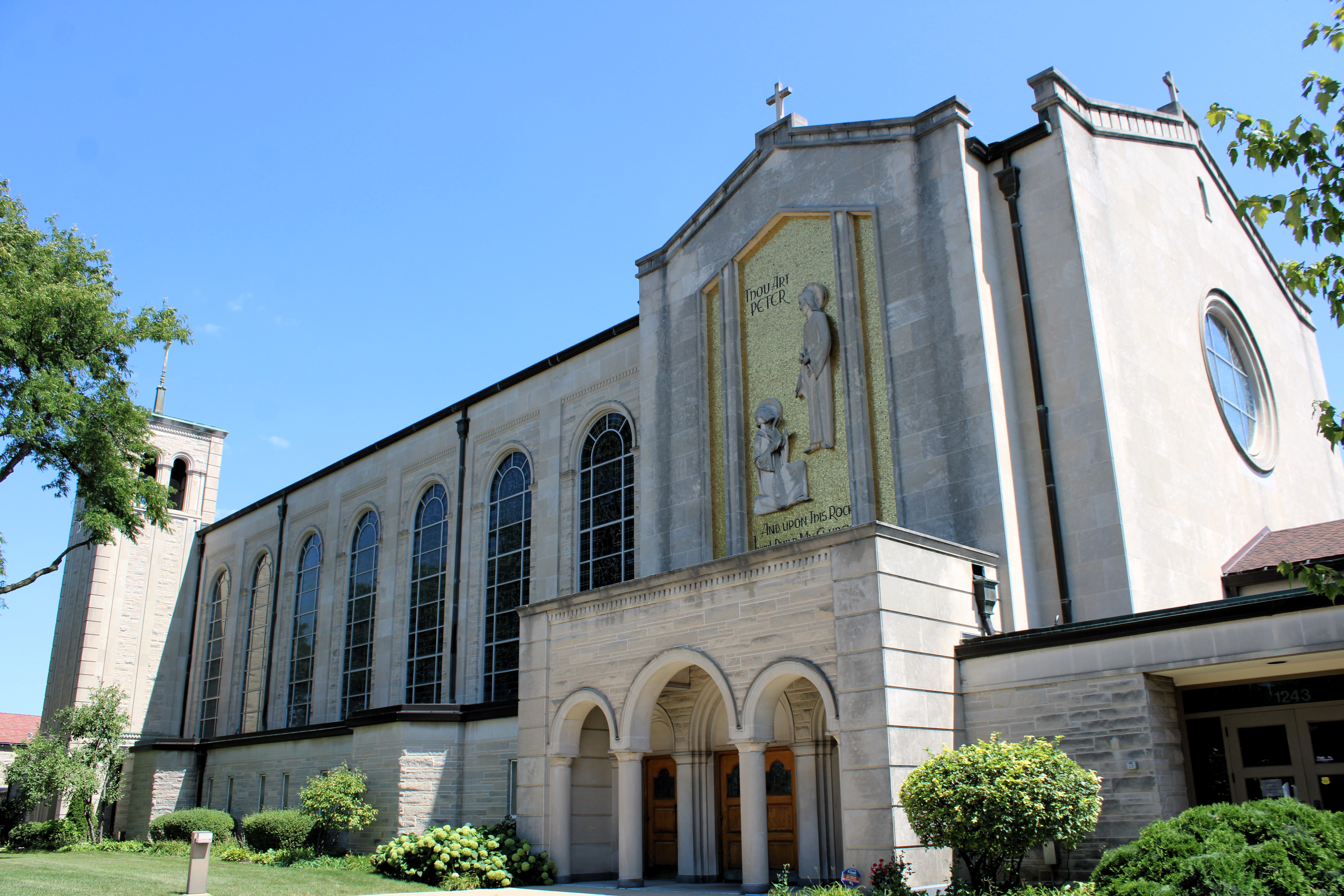
Cathedral of Saint Peter, the mother church of the Roman Catholic Diocese of Rockford

According to 2010 figures, 20% of Winnebago County residents were Catholic, 19% Evangelical, 10% Mainline Protestant and 48% belonged to another faith or had no religion. The Roman Catholic Diocese of Rockford, several large evangelical and non-denominational churches, and several Lutheran and other Mainline Protestant congregations serve Rockford's Christian community. Rockford's Jewish community is served by a synagogue, the Muslim community by a mosque, the Sikhs by a temple, and its Buddhist community is served by two houses of worship.

== Economy ==
=== Largest employers ===
As of January 2024, the ten largest employers in Rockford, Illinois are:

Rank	Company/organization name	# of employees
1	Rockford Public School District 205	4,075
2	UW Health (SwedishAmerican Hospital)	3,780
3	Mercy Health	3,000
4	OSF Healthcare (OSF Saint Anthony Medical Center)	2,200
5	UPS (Rockford Air Hub)	2,000
6	Collins Aerospace	2,000
7	Woodward, Inc.	2,000
8	Amazon	1,535
9	Walmart Stores	1,470
10	Stellantis (Belvidere Assembly Plant)	1,459

=== Other industry ===
The Rockford Region is the largest center of aerospace production employment in Illinois and sixth in the United States. The Rockford Area Aerospace Network (RAAN) connects over 250 aerospace suppliers within a 90-minute radius, supporting products and services for Boeing, Airbus, Blue Origin, and the U.S. Department of Defense. The region has 7.2 times the national average for industrial machinery manufacturing employment. The healthcare sector is anchored by three major healthcare systems. Chicago Rockford International Airport is one of the nation's fastest-growing cargo airports, supporting logistics and distribution industries.Mrs. Fisher's, a regional manufacturer of potato chips, was founded in Rockford.

== Arts and culture ==
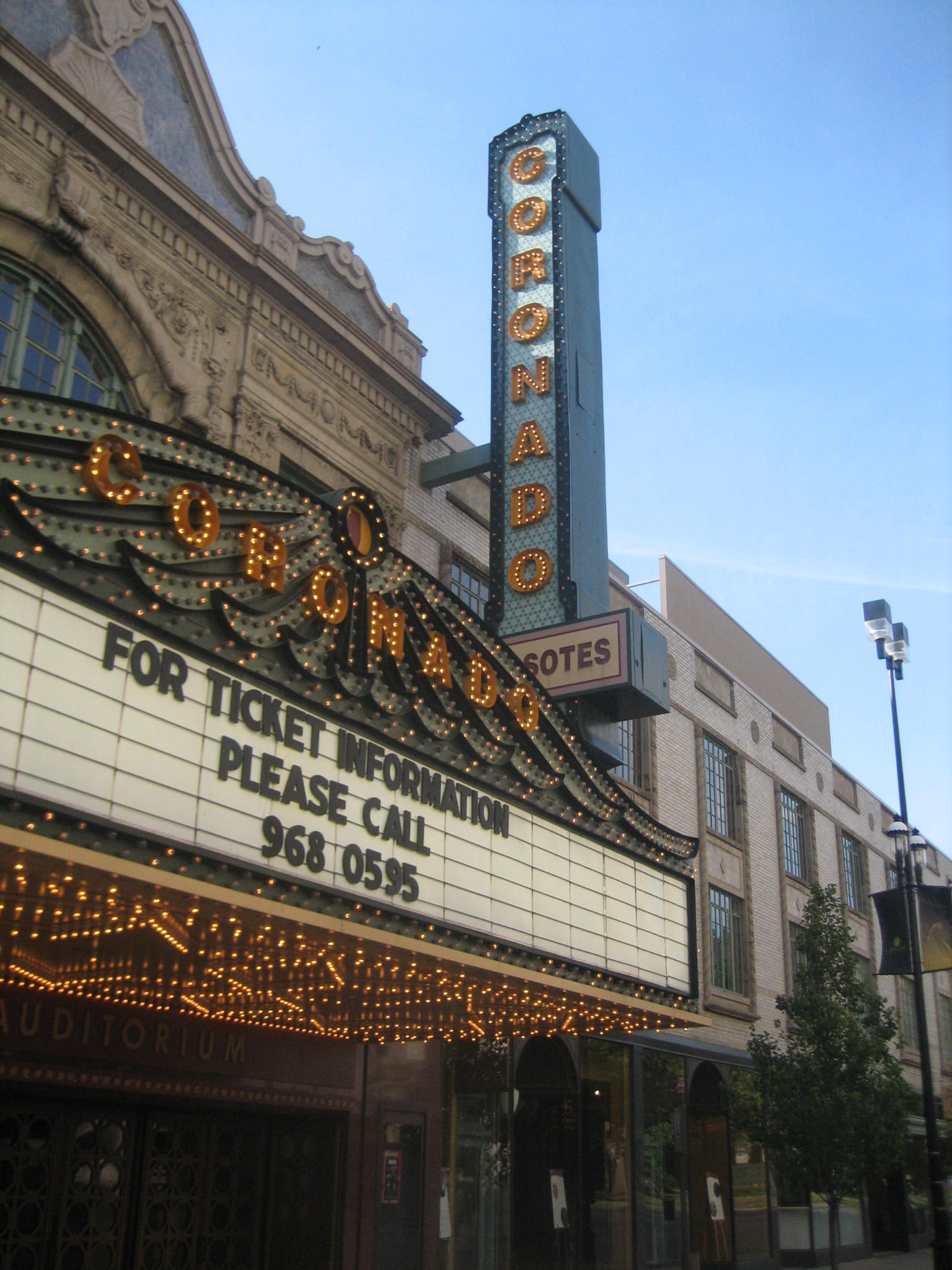
Coronado Theatre marquee in its Art Deco styling

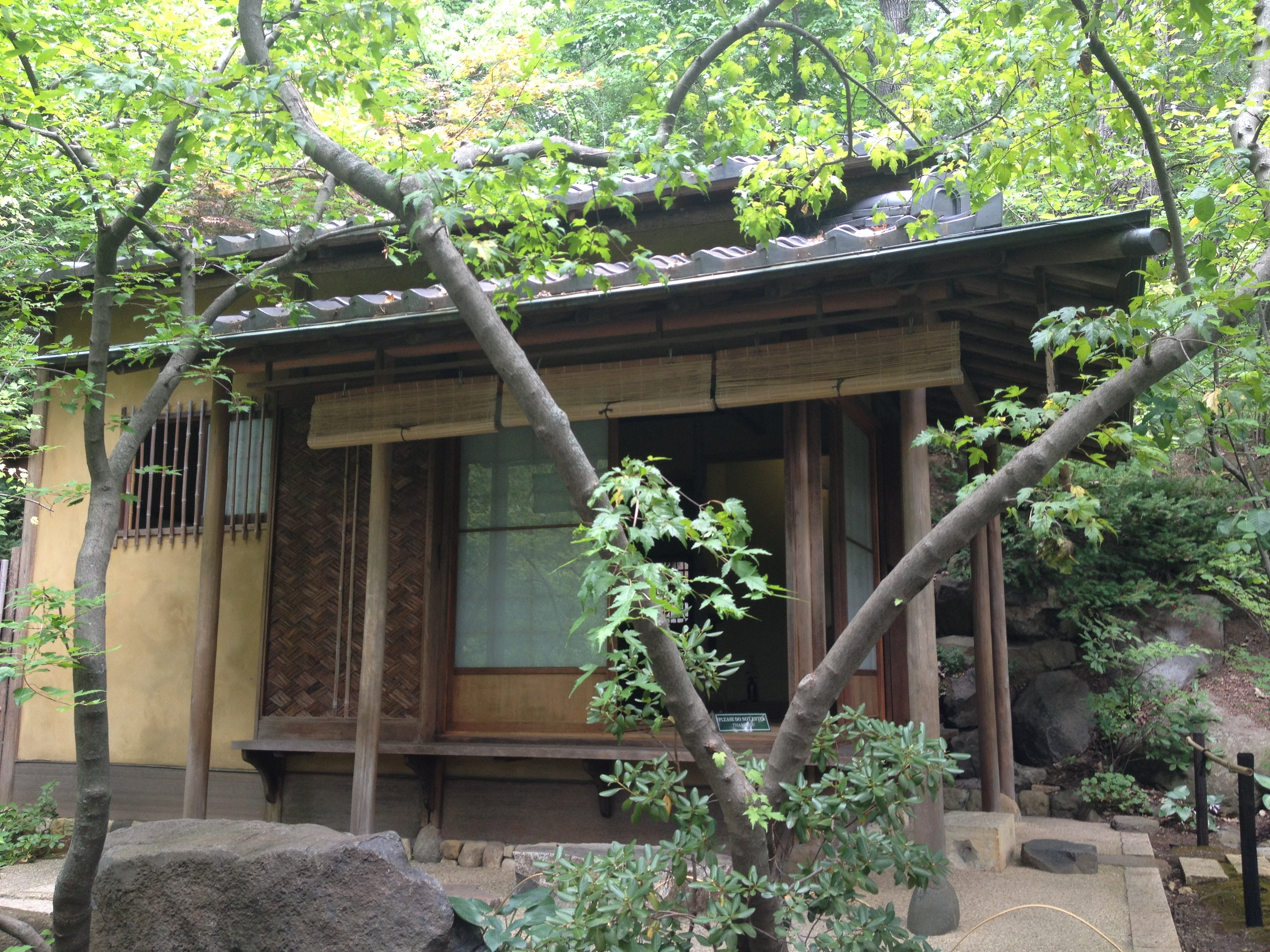
Tea house within Anderson Japanese Gardens

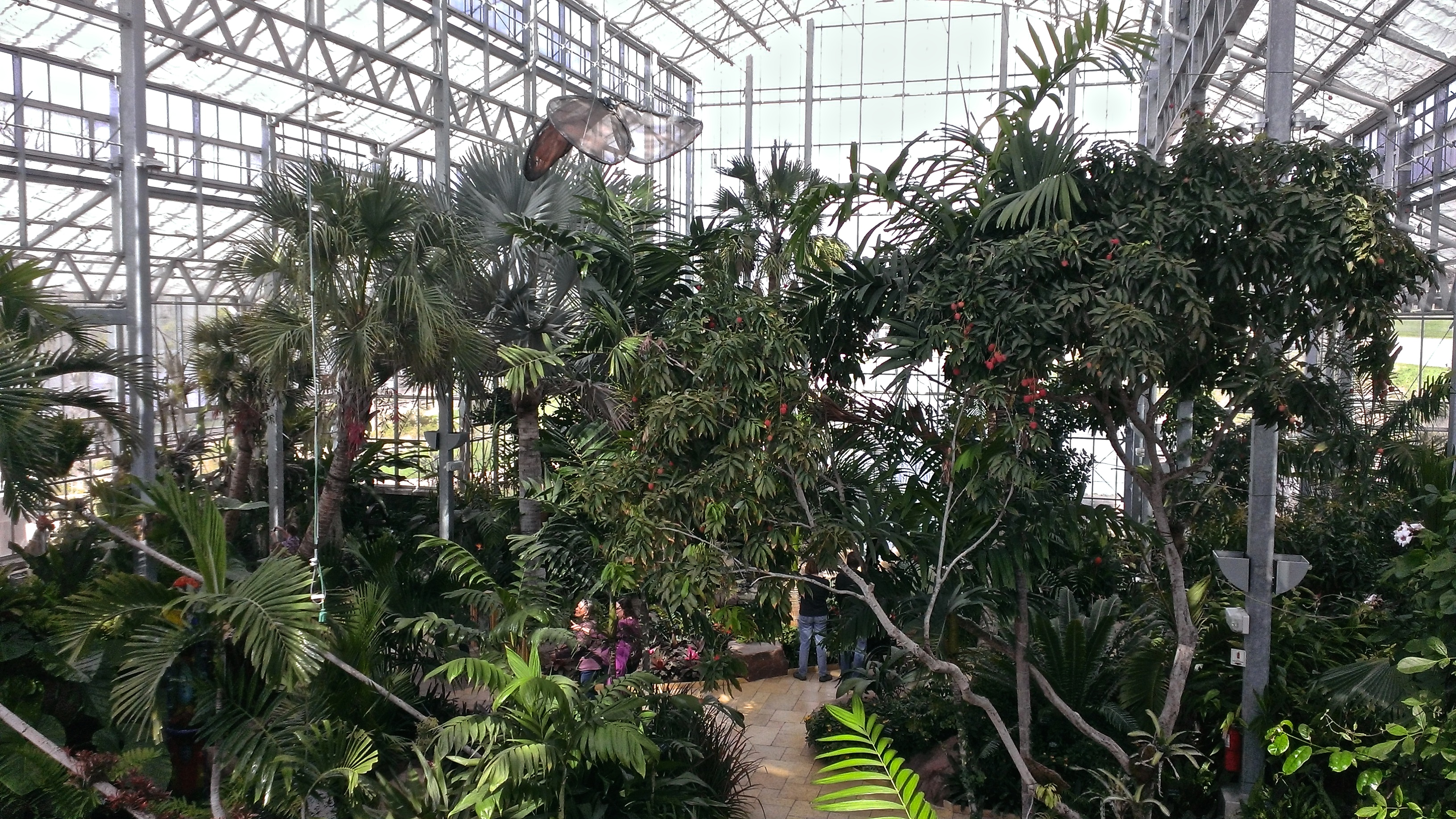
Nicholas Conservatory

Compared to Katowice by writer Leopold Tyrmand, Rockford possesses a wealth of notable architecture. The Lake-Peterson House, constructed by alderman John Lake in 1873 and preserved by Swedish industrialist Pehr August Peterson, is a notable example of Gothic Revival. Added to the National Register of Historic Places in 1980, it is used for the School of Medical Technology of the Rockford-based Swedish American Hospital.

Further Swedish influence on Rockford during the Victorian era is represented in the Erlander Home Museum, the base of the Swedish Historical Society. Swiss influence can be seen in the Tinker Swiss Cottage, which was opened as a museum under the park district in 1943 and was featured in an episode of Ghost Hunters in 2012.

Modern architectural movements, like Art Deco and Prairie School, are also integral to Rockford. Most renowned is the Coronado Theatre, a civic and entertainment center named one of 150 Great Places in Illinois by the American Institute of Architects. The theater is known for its blend of Art Deco with Spanish Baroque Revival and has hosted numerous performers over its lifetime, including the Marx Brothers, Frank Sinatra, and Bob Dylan. The 186-foot tall Faust Hotel complements the Coronado; constructed in 1929, it endures as Rockford's tallest building, albeit as apartments for the elderly and disabled. The Laurent House, a single-story Usonian home constructed in 1952 by Frank Lloyd Wright, is the only Wright building designed for a person with disabilities. Acquired by a private foundation from its commissioners, it was renovated into a museum in 2014. The Rockford Area has two additional places named by the American Institute of Architects in the 150 Great Places, Anderson Japanese Gardens in Rockford, Illinois and Poplar Grove United Methodist Church in Poplar Grove, Illinois.

Anderson Japanese Gardens, modeled after the Portland Japanese Garden and landscaped by Hoichi Kurisu, is 10 acres in size and features a teahouse and guesthouse in the sukiya-zukuri style. Klehm Arboretum and Botanic Garden is 155 acres in size and is noted for its selection of both indigenous and foreign plant species.

The Burpee Museum of Natural History is home to the world's most complete juvenile Tyrannosaurus rex, Jane, as well as a Triceratops, Homer. The Discovery Center Museum, a children's museum featuring over 250 hands-on exhibits including a planetarium. The Burpee Museum and the Discovery Center Museum, along with the Rockford Art Museum and the bases for Northern Public Radio, the Rockford Dance Company, and the Rockford Symphony Orchestra make up the downtown Riverfront Museum Park complex. The last museum under the park district's authority is Midway Village Museum, a recreation of a Victorian-era village. The eastern riverwalk of Rockford is maintained by the park district, featuring the Nicholas Conservatory and Gardens. Located on the bank of the Rock River, the conservatory is the third-largest in the state of Illinois. Just north of the gardens is Symbol, an Alexander Liberman sculpture moved from downtown during the 1980s and now one of Rockford's most recognizable features.

In 2021, artist Rafael Blanco painted "Thinking of you Rockford" in Rockford, Illinois. The 22-foot by 77-foot piece featured a young Black female dreaming alongside math and science illustrations.

== Sports ==
=== Current teams ===
- Rockford IceHogs (ice hockey; UHL 1999–2007, AHL 2007–present)
- Rockford Rivets (baseball; NWL 2015–present)
- Rockford Rage (women's roller derby; 2006–present)

=== Historic teams ===
- Rockford Forest Citys (baseball, 1871)
- Rockford Peaches (women's baseball; AAGPBL, 1943–1954)
- Rockford Lightning (basketball; CBA, 1986–2005)
- Rockford Aviators (baseball; Frontier League 2002–2009, Northern League 2010, Frontier League 2011–2015)
- Rockford Rampage (indoor soccer; AISL 2005–2008, NISL 2008–2010)
- Rockford Fury (basketball; PBL, 2006–2008)
- Rockford Foresters (baseball; Midwest Collegiate League 2010–2013)

=== Rockford Peaches ===
From 1943 to 1954, the Rockford Peaches were an inaugural team of the All-American Girls Professional Baseball League. Playing home games at Beyer Stadium, the Peaches won league championships in 1945, 1948, 1949, and 1950; the four championships are the most of any league member. The team and the league itself were portrayed in the 1992 motion picture A League of Their Own.

=== Notable sporting events ===
Rockford will be the host for the 2027 Women's Baseball World Cup.

Rockford also hosts the largest single-day rowing regatta in the United States, the Head of the Rock Regatta. This is a 5000 meter race from the Riverside Boulevard Bridge to the Whitman Street Bridge that has occurred annually every second Sunday in October since 1985.

== Parks and recreation ==
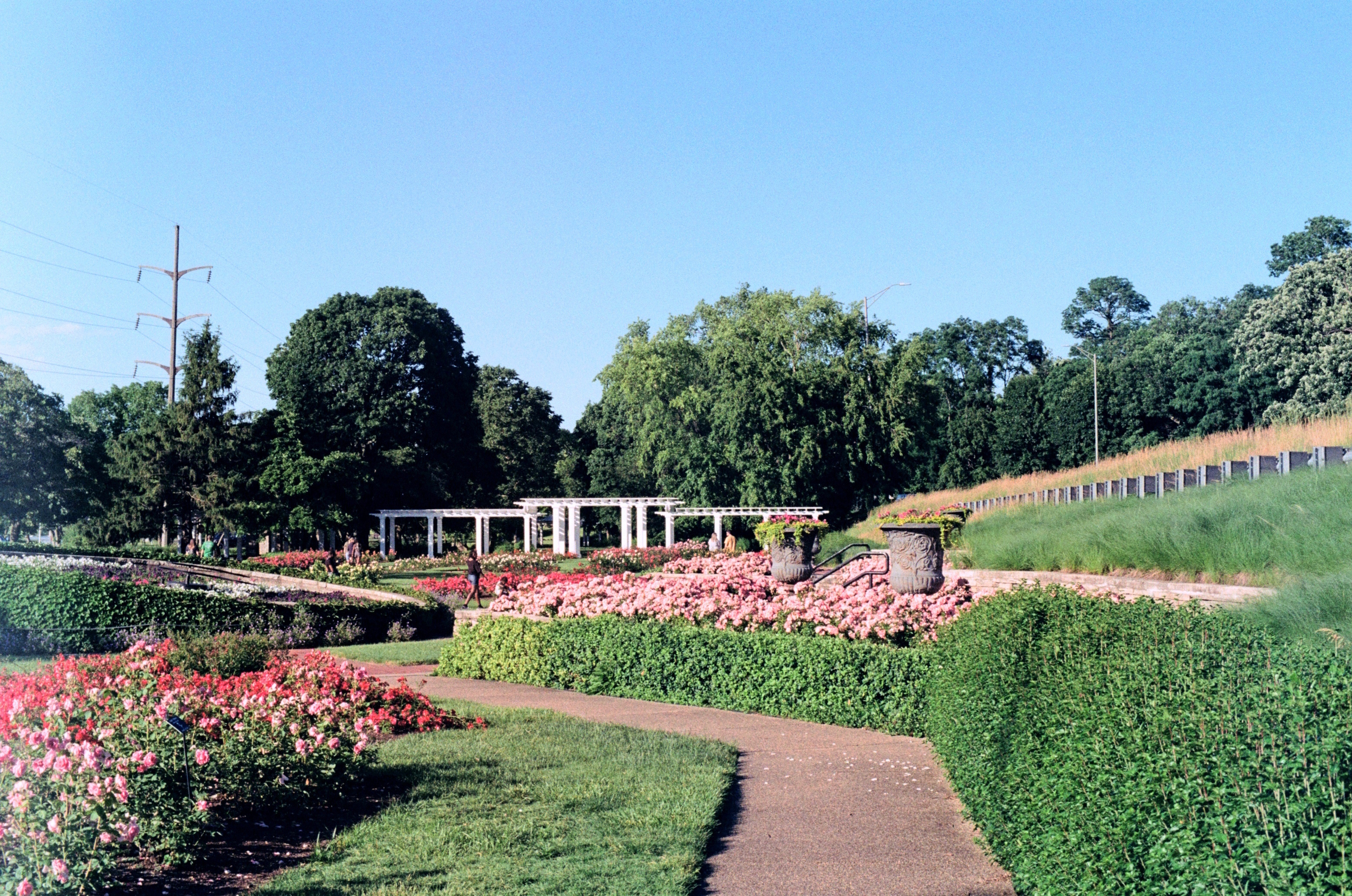
Sinnissippi Rose Garden at the Nicholas Conservatory & Gardens, located alongside the Rock River.

The Rockford Park District serves Rockford and surrounding municipalities with 4,855 acres of parkland, 75 miles of paths and trails, and 82 playgrounds. Searls Park in Northwest Rockford contains a high quality remnant prairie registered as an Illinois Nature Preserve. Paths in Rockford include the Mel Anderson Memorial path in Northwest Rockford, and the Rock River Rec Path on the east bank of the Rock River. Rockford Park District operates 2 outdoor pools in Rockford, Harkins Aquatic Center and Alpine Pool, and owns Six Flags Hurricane Harbor Rockford, which is managed by Six Flags. The Rockford Park District also operates an ice rink, equestrian center, snow hill park, disk golf course in the city.

There are five golf courses in the city limits and two more that directly border the city. The Rockford Park District operates 4 municipal golf courses, Aldeen Golf Club, Ingersoll Golf Club, Sandy Hollow Golf Course, and Sinnissippi Golf Course. The Rockford Country Club is the only private golf course in city limits, but The Mauh-Nah-Tee-See Country Club and Forest Hills Country Club directly border the city.

Davis Park is located in Downtown on the west bank of the Rock River, and is the only Park owned by the City of Rockford. As of 2025 the park is undergoing a 12 million dollar renovation to build an outdoor stage, skatepark, and accessible playground.

== Government ==
Rockford, Illinois
- Crime rates* (2019)

Violent crimes
- Homicide: 6.0
- Rape: 67.2
- Robbery: 94.1
- Aggravated assault: 467.2
- Total violent crime: 634.5

Property crimes
- Burglary: 425.4
- Larceny-theft: 1572.0
- Motor vehicle theft: 163.4
- Total property crime: 2160.9
- Note: Reported crimes per 100,000 population Source: 2019 FBI UCR Data

Since the creation of Winnebago County in 1836, Rockford has served as its county seat. Rockford is the largest Dillon's Rule municipality in Illinois, having revoked home rule in 1983. Along with a mayor (elected every four years), the Rockford City Council consists of 14 alderman (elected every 4 years), with the city divided into 14 wards.

In a fashion similar to other cities its size (or larger), local government is split into executive and legislative branches. The mayor of Rockford is chosen in a general election every four years. The Rockford City Council consists of 14 aldermen, individually elected from each ward in the city.

== Education ==
=== Post-secondary ===
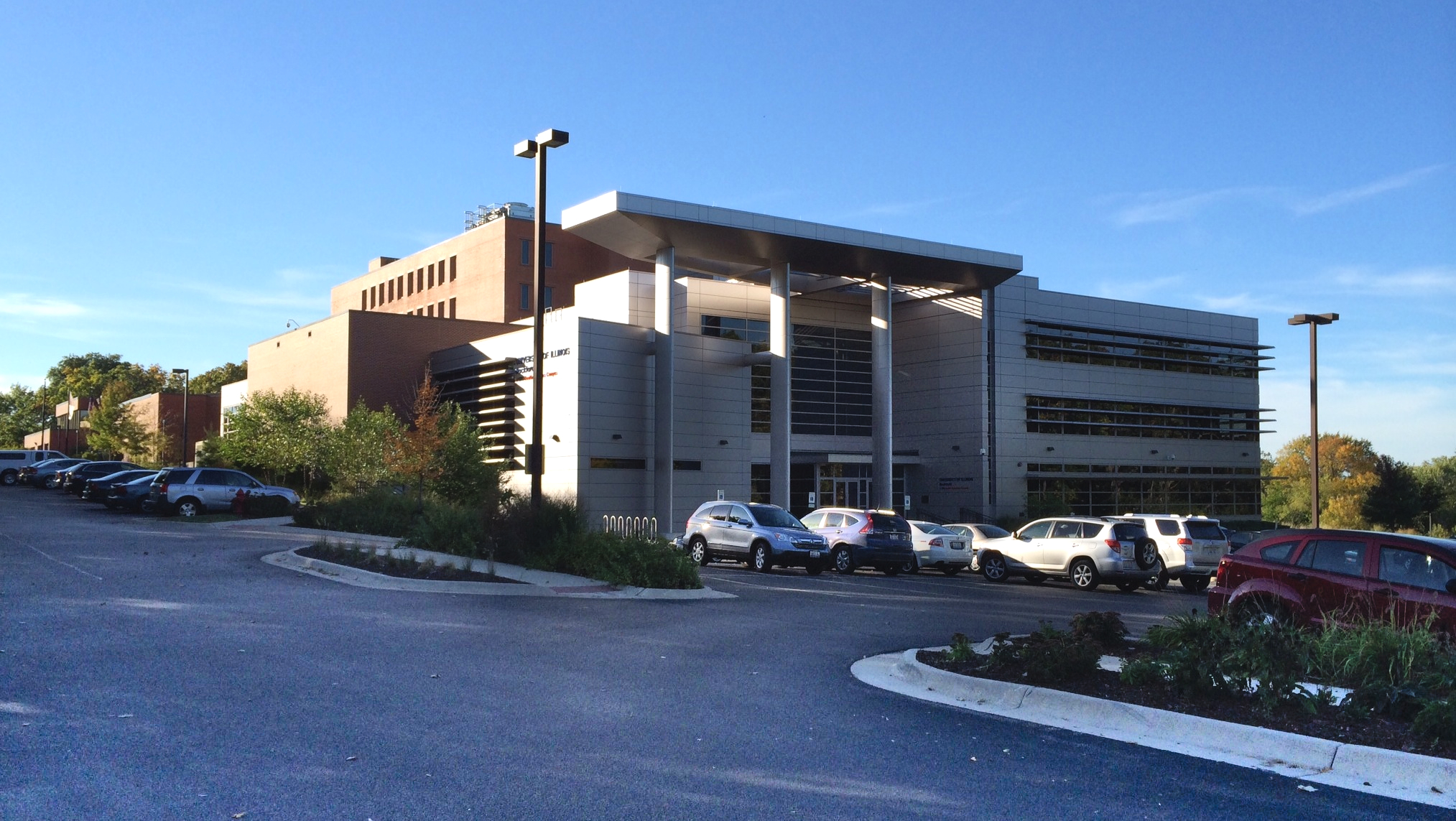
Rockford Campus of the University of Illinois College of Medicine

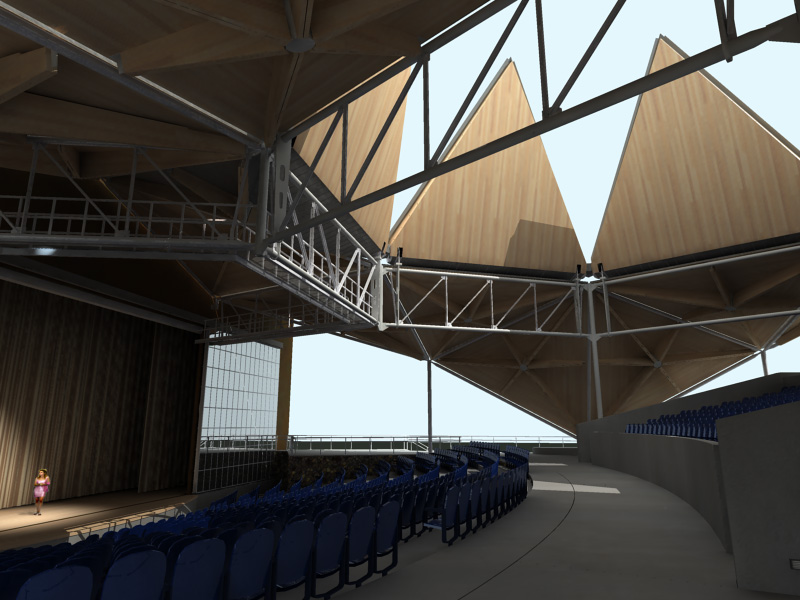
Bengt Sjostrom Theatre at Rock Valley College

Post-secondary schools located in Rockford include:

- Rockford University, a private 4-year school of just under 2000 students
- Rock Valley College, a 10,000-student community college
- Rockford Career College
- St. Anthony College of Nursing

Rockford contains satellite branches of:

- Judson University
- Northern Illinois University
- Rasmussen College
- University of Illinois College of Medicine

=== Public schools ===
The majority of Rockford is within the Rockford Public School District 205. The district contains 41 schools, approximately 27,700 students, and 4,071 employees.

High schools include Auburn High School, East High School, Guilford High School, and Jefferson High School

Small pieces of Rockford in Winnebago County extend into Winnebago Community Unit School District 323, Harlem Unit School District 122, and the Meridian Community Unit School District 223. The portion of Rockford in Ogle County is in the Meridian district.

=== Private schools ===
Private schools include Boylan Catholic High School, Keith Country Day School, Rockford Lutheran High School, and Rockford Iqra School.

== Media ==
Rockford is the 161st largest radio market in the United States. It is ranked 136th by Nielsen Media Research for the 2015-2016 television season with 170,140 television households.

The area is served by over 15 commercial radio stations, over 5 non-commercial radio stations, 2 low power FM radio stations, 5 TV stations and 1 daily newspaper.

== Transportation ==
=== Roads and highways ===
- Interstate 39
- Interstate 90 (Jane Addams Memorial Tollway)
- U.S. Route 20 (Ulysses S. Grant Memorial Highway)
- U.S. Route 51
- Illinois Route 2 (South/North Main Street)
- Illinois Route 70 (Kilburn Avenue)
- Illinois Route 251 (North Second Street, Kishwaukee Street, Harrison Avenue, 11th Street)

=== Bus ===
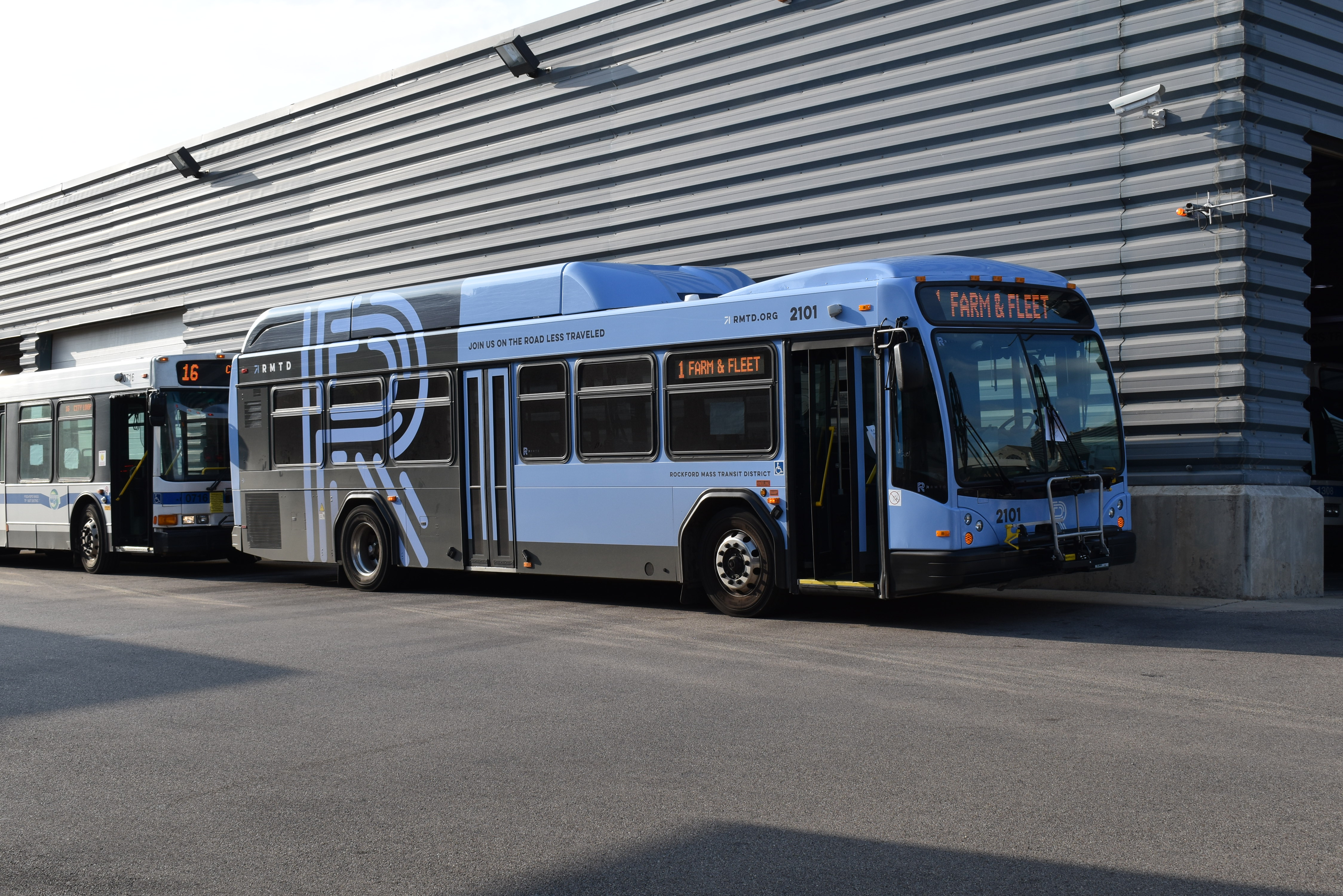
RMTD Bus

The Rockford Mass Transit District provides fixed-route and paratransit service to Rockford, Loves Park, and Machesney Park. The 40 fixed route buses operate over 17 routes.

Greyhound Lines and Van Galder Bus Company provide intercity travel.

=== Bicycle-sharing system ===
In April 2018, Rockford became included in the LimeBike bicycle-sharing network. Using 500 commuter bicycles supplied by the company, residents rent bicycles through a mobile app, unlocking the dockless bicycles. Distinguished by their bright green color, LimeBikes are equipped with a basket, lights, and GPS (to locate them for rental); one-speed and three-speed units are in use.

In early 2019, LimeBike was discontinued in Rockford; the company shifted its business model away from bicycles to e-scooters.

=== Air ===
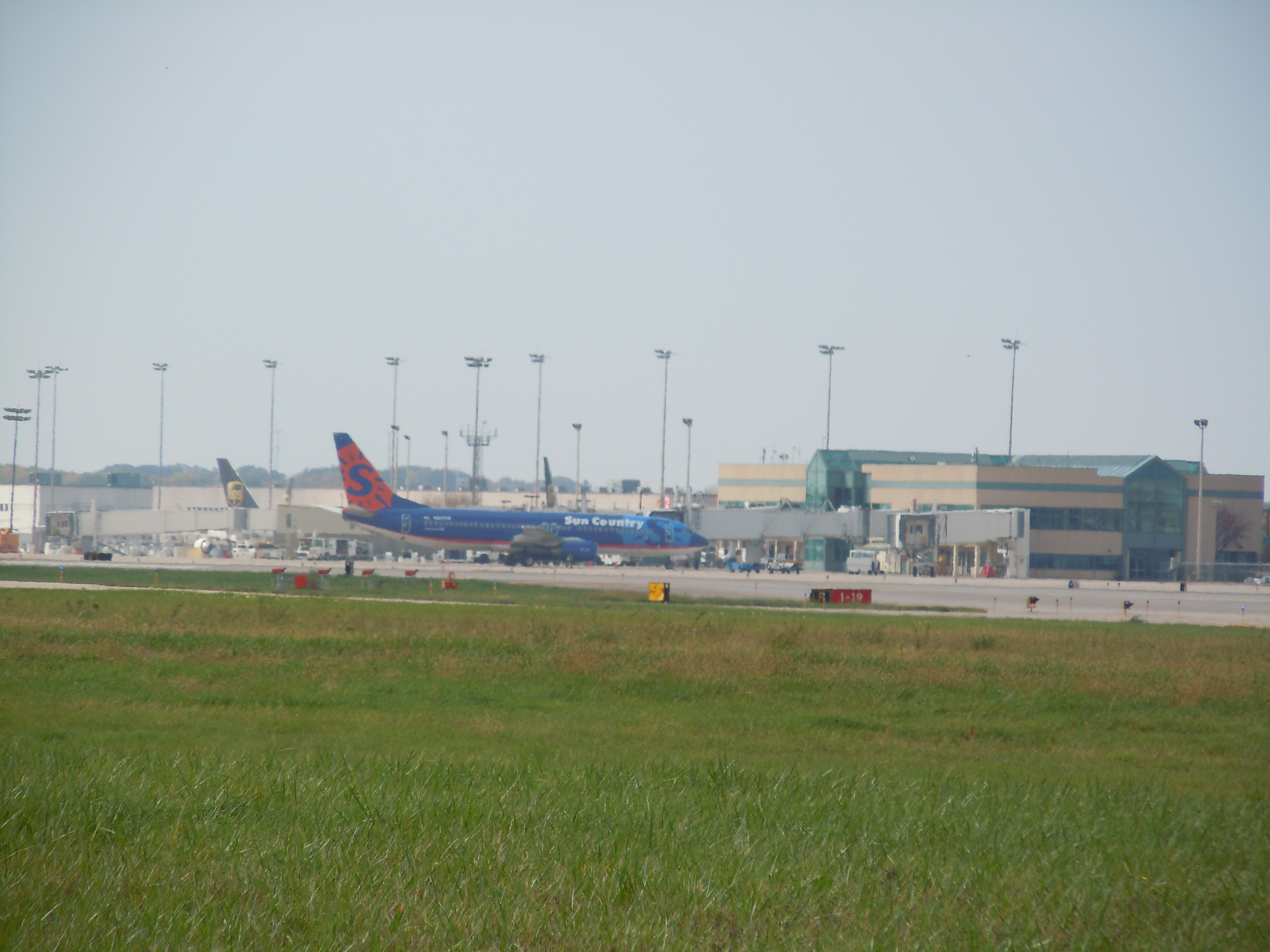
Main terminal at Chicago Rockford International Airport

The first airport serving the Rockford area was Machesney Airport, located north of the city alongside US 51. Opened in 1927, the airport was initially a private airport; during World War II, it was utilized by the Army Air Corps. After the war, Machesney Airport was opened as a municipal airport. In 1974, the location was closed, becoming the site of the Machesney Park Mall in 1980.

After Camp Grant's final closure in 1946, the state legislature allowed for the establishment of an airport to serve Rockford, leading to the creation of the Greater Rockford Airport Authority (GRAA). In 1948, the GRAA received a 1500-acre portion of the Camp Grant property between US 51 and the Rock River, located between the southern border of the city and New Milford.

From the 1950s to 1970s, the Greater Rockford Airport served as a regional airport, with small airlines offering both turboprop and jet service. To further expand passenger service, the current passenger terminal was constructed in 1987. Competing against easy highway access (and bus service) to O'Hare International Airport, the airport struggled for passenger service during the 1990s, leading to the loss of passenger service from 2001 to 2003. Since 2003, the airport has restored passenger service, primarily marketing its location for leisure travelers. Following the closure of several airlines, the location is served by Allegiant Air as its passenger carrier. Following a 2005 upgrade, the passenger terminal was expanded in size in 2018.

During the 2000s, the airport underwent several name changes, adopting the current Chicago Rockford International Airport moniker in 2007. Among the fastest-growing freight airports in the world, full-scale cargo operations began in 1994 as United Parcel Service (UPS) opened an air package hub at the airport next to the terminal. Second only to Worldport in the UPS Airlines operations, the Rockford UPS hub operates on a separate 50-acre ramp (parking up to 40 aircraft at a time), accommodating up to a Boeing 747-8F.

Next to the UPS facilities, another cargo ramp was built in 2008, intended to attract additional cargo airlines. In 2016, the facilities were leased by ABX, intending to transfer freight from aircraft to trucks; the operations transitioned into flights for Amazon Air, who partners with ABX, ATI, and Atlas Air. The same year, AAR Corporation opened an FBO facility on the southern end of the airport, building hangars large enough to accommodate an Airbus A380. In 2021, cargo operations were expanded further, as the airport constructed an additional cargo-handling facility and cargo ramp, introducing service by German air cargo company Senator International, contracting 747s by Air Atlanta Icelandic. In 2022, Korean Air Cargo introduced cargo service from Seoul to Rockford on 777-300 freighters, becoming the longest flight from the airport.

=== Rail ===
Freight rail remains active in the Rockford area, served by Union Pacific, Canadian National, Canadian Pacific (via Iowa, Chicago and Eastern Railroad), and Illinois Railway. Passenger rail service has been absent from the Rockford region since 1981, when the Amtrak Black Hawk route, a daily train service from Dubuque, Iowa, to Chicago via Rockford, was discontinued due to funding cuts. Interest in restoring service grew in the 2000s, with a 2006 proposal to extend Metra service from Chicago suburbs. In the early 2010s, design work began on a Black Hawk revival on Canadian National rails, but funding was suspended in 2015 during Illinois' budget crisis.

Support returned in 2019 under Governor J.B. Pritzker, and in 2023, it was announced that the Illinois Department of Transportation (IDOT) has selected Metra over Amtrak to operate Rockford Intercity Passenger Rail with twice-daily service in each direction beginning in 2027. The route would share tracks with Metra's Milwaukee District West Line between Chicago and Elgin, but will operate as a separate service with direct funding support IDOT.

== Sister cities ==
Rockford's sister cities are:

- Brovary, Ukraine (1995)
- Changzhou, China (1999)
- Borgholm, Sweden (2002)
- Cluj-Napoca, Romania (2005)
- Ferentino, Italy (2006)
- Tokmok, Kyrgyzstan (2006)
- Taszár, Hungary (2007)

Lidköping and Skaraborg County in Sweden have the Industrial Partnership Agreement with Rockford. The two regions work together with growing locally by working globally.

== See also ==
- Irish Marching Society
- Rockford Pro-Am Golf Tournament
- Harlem Park amusement park and Chautauqua site 1891-1928
