= Machesney Park, Illinois =

Machesney Park
- Village
- Flag Logo

- Location of Machesney Park in Winnebago County, Illinois.
- Coordinates: 42°22′38″N 89°01′07″W
- Country: United States
- State: Illinois
- County: Winnebago
- Founded: February 24, 1981

Government
  - Village President: Steve Johnson

Area
  - Total: 13.03 sq mi (33.74 km^{2})
  - Land: 12.68 sq mi (32.85 km^{2})
  - Water: 0.34 sq mi (0.89 km^{2})
- Elevation: 738 ft (225 m)

Population (2020)
  - Total: 22,950
  - Density: 1,809.2/sq mi (698.53/km^{2})
- Time zone: UTC−6 (CST)
  - Summer (DST): UTC−5 (CDT)
- ZIP code: 61103, 61111, 61115
- Area code: 815
- FIPS code: 17-45726
- GNIS feature ID: 2399215
- Website: machesneypark.org

Machesney Park is a village located in Winnebago County, Illinois, United States. The population was 22,950 at the 2020 census. Machesney Park is part of the Rockford metropolitan area.

== History ==
The name Machesney Park has its roots in Machesney Airport, a rural airfield on North Second Street where Machesney Mall stands today. It was established in the 1920s by Fred "Mac" Machesney, a barnstorming aviator who went on to train more than 4,000 pilots there; the nearby Machesney Elementary School was also named for him. The airfield served as Rockford's main airport until the 1950s, when the Greater Rockford Airport opened, and it was used by fighter aircraft as a stopover during World War II before closing in the 1970s.

In August 1928, aviators Bert "Fish" Hassell and Parker "Shorty" Cramer took off from the field in the Stinson monoplane Greater Rockford attempting to fly the Great Circle route to Stockholm, Sweden. Running low on fuel over Greenland, they made a forced landing on the Maniitsoq ice cap and walked for two weeks before reaching safety.

This area of unincorporated Winnebago County saw growth pick up after World War II, leading to the formation of North Park, a public water district and volunteer firefighting company that gave the area its unofficial name. Residents began a grass-roots incorporation movement in 1980, and in the winter of 1981 voters approved a referendum to form the Village of Machesney Park, officially incorporated on February 24, 1981; the first village officers were elected the following spring.

== Geography ==
According to the 2020 census, Machesney Park has a total area of 13.03 square miles (33.75 km^{2}), of which 12.69 square miles (32.87 km^{2}) (or 97.4%) is land and 0.34 square miles (0.88 km^{2}) (or 2.6%) is water.

== Demographics ==
Historical population
Census	Pop.	Note	%±
1990	19,033		—
2000	20,759		9.1%
2010	23,499		13.2%
2020	22,950		−2.3%
U.S. Decennial Census

=== 2020 census ===
As of the 2020 census, Machesney Park had a population of 22,950. The median age was 41.2 years. 22.0% of residents were under the age of 18 and 17.0% of residents were 65 years of age or older. For every 100 females there were 99.5 males, and for every 100 females age 18 and over there were 97.0 males age 18 and over.

There were 9,134 households in Machesney Park, of which 29.8% had children under the age of 18 living in them. Of all households, 48.1% were married-couple households, 18.9% were households with a male householder and no spouse or partner present, and 23.8% were households with a female householder and no spouse or partner present. About 25.4% of all households were made up of individuals and 10.2% had someone living alone who was 65 years of age or older.

There were 9,663 housing units, of which 5.5% were vacant. The homeowner vacancy rate was 1.6% and the rental vacancy rate was 8.8%.

Racial composition as of the 2020 census
Race	Number	Percent
White	19,113	83.3%
Black or African American	738	3.2%
American Indian and Alaska Native	79	0.3%
Asian	498	2.2%
Native Hawaiian and Other Pacific Islander	10	0.0%
Some other race	552	2.4%
Two or more races	1,960	8.5%
Hispanic or Latino (of any race)	1,752	7.6%

=== 2010 census ===
At the 2010 census there were 23,499 people, 9,351 households. The population density was 758 inhabitants per square mile (293/km^{2}). There were 9,351 housing units at an average density of 301.5 per square mile (116.4/km^{2}). The racial makeup of the village was 91.47% White, 2.83% African American, 0.24% Native American, 1.55% Asian, 0.03% Pacific Islander, 1.63% from other races, and 2.25% from two or more races. Hispanic or Latino of any race were 4.99%.

=== 2000 census ===
In 2000 Of the 7,756 households 35.9% had children under the age of 18 living with them, 61.2% were married couples living together, 9.7% had a female householder with no husband present, and 24.2% were non-families. 19.2% of households were one person and 6.6% were one person aged 65 or older. The average household size was 2.68 and the average family size was 3.04.

The age distribution was 24.3% under the age of 18, 5.46% from 20 to 24, 12.41% from 25 to 34, 22.83% from 35 to 49, 19.81% from 50 to 64 and 12.40% 65 or older. The median age was 36 years. There were about as many females as males (9 more males).

In 2000 The median household income was $48,315, and the median family income was $53,788. Males had a median income of $38,619 versus $23,279 for females. The per capita income for the village was $19,685. About 3.2% of families and 5.3% of the population were below the poverty line, including 6.7% of those under age 18 and 4.8% of those age 65 or over.

== Education ==
The majority of Machesney Park is in the Harlem School District 122. The Harlem District serves portions of the communities of Machesney Park and Loves Park, southern Roscoe, and a portion of Rockford. The Village is home of Harlem High School, which is part of the Harlem School District.

Portions of Machesney Park are in the Rockford School District 205. A small portion extends into the Rockton School District 140 and the Hononegah Community High School District 207.

== Transportation ==
RMTD provides bus service on Routes 20 and 22 connecting Machesney Park to destinations throughout the Rockford area.

== Village presidents ==
- Linda Vaughn (D) 2001–2009
- Tom Strickland (R) 2009–2013
- Jerry D. Bolin 2013–2017
- Steve Johnson 2017–present
