= Machesney Airport =

- IATA: none; ICAO: none; FAA LID: RMC

Summary
- Airport type: Private
- Owner: Fred Machesney
- Serves: Rockford, Illinois
- Location: Machesney Park, Illinois
- Coordinates: 42°20′59.77″N 089°3′11.2″W
- Interactive map of Machesney Airport

Runways
Direction	Length		Surface
Direction	ft	m	Surface
5/23	2,900	884	Turf

Machesney Airport, officially opened as Rockford Airport, was a small rural airport located in Machesney Park, Illinois, United States.

== History ==
The airport was established by Fred Machesney, a barnstorming aviator, who acquired a 55-acre tract of land in June 1927 and expanded it to 160 acres. It officially opened as the "Rockford Airport" on July 8, 1927, with three 60-foot-square hangars capable of housing twelve aircraft, two smaller hangars, a workshop, a classroom, and a waiting room.

On August 18, 1928, aviators Bert "Fish" Hassell and Parker "Shorty" Cramer departed the field in the Stinson monoplane Greater Rockford, attempting to fly the Great Circle route to Stockholm, Sweden. Running low on fuel, they made a forced landing in Greenland and were out of contact until September 2; they returned to Rockford on October 18, 1928.

A revolving beacon was donated and installed at the field to support airmail service, and Northwest Airways used the airport on its mail routes from 1930 to 1933. In 1939, the airport partnered with Beloit College to run a Civilian Pilot Training Program; from 1939 to 1943 it trained 1,139 military students and an estimated 2,000 civilian students. The airfield was used during World War II as a stopover for United States military aircraft being ferried to the Soviet Union. The airfield had a few buildings and a restaurant; aircraft parked on the dirt and grass ramp and took off on a grass runway.

In the early 1960s, the airport offered flying lessons for $12 an hour, using circa 1939 Aeronca Champs as trainers. At least two of the instructors, Vince Block and Van Guilder, had been barnstormers, like the airport owner.

A tornado in 1966 damaged hangars and aircraft at the airport. Longtime instructor Harold Bish later described the field as "the oldest longest operating Fixed Base Operator in the U.S."

== Decline and redevelopment ==
After the Greater Rockford Airport (now Chicago Rockford International Airport) opened, business at Machesney Airport declined. The airport closed in 1974, 20 years after the Greater Rockford Airport opened.

The name of the airport's founder was used to name the new Machesney Park village, formed within the bounds of what is still called North Park. After closing, the airport property was redeveloped as the Machesney Park Mall in 1978.
