= Harlem High School (Illinois) =

Coordinates: 42°21′21″N 89°01′32″W

Location
- 1 Huskie Circle; Machesney Park, Illinois 61115; United States

Information
- School type: Public Secondary
- Established: 1910
- School district: Harlem School District 122
- Superintendent: Terrell Yarbrough
- Principal: Jeremy Bois
- Teaching staff: 137.90 (FTE)
- Grades: 9–12
- Gender: Coed
- Enrollment: 1,947 (2023–2024)
- Student to teacher ratio: 14.12
- Campus type: Suburban
- Colors: Orange; Black
- Fight song: Stand Up and Cheer
- Athletics conference: Northern Illinois Conference (NIC-10)
- Mascot: Huskie
- Nickname: Huskies
- Yearbook: Meteor
- Website: Official School Website

Harlem High School is a public secondary school and part of the Harlem School District 122 in Machesney Park, Illinois, USA. It has approximately 2,600 students. The freshman campus for 9th grade was closed in 2019; new freshmen are incorporated into the main high school. Its sport teams are named the Harlem Huskies.

== Demographics and statistics ==
The Demographics of the school are as follows (Greatest -> Least):

1. White – 73.5%
2. Hispanic – 13.3%
3. Two or More – 6.3%
4. Black – 4.3%
5. Asian – 2.3%
6. American Indian – 0.3%
7. Pacific Islander – 0.1%

The rate of graduation is 84% 20% of students are coming in and out of the district in 2019 38% of all students going to the school are missing 10% or more of all school days.

== Academics ==
The school offers several AP courses in such subjects as English Literature and Composition, United States History, and World History. Also offered are CTE (Career and Technical Education) classes through the Career Education Associates of North Central Illinois, a partnership with the Regional Alternative School, and a program in which students can take college level classes through the nearby Rock Valley College.

== Athletics ==
Sports at Harlem are offered on a seasonal basis. Sports offered include football, cross country, golf, track & field, soccer, tennis, swimming, softball, baseball, basketball, bowling, wrestling, cheerleading, dance team, and girls flag football.

== Extracurricular activities ==
Harlem has a Science Olympiad Team that often wins the regional competition and proceeds to the state level. Other student organizations include National Honor Society, Key Club, Model UN, and a German Club.

== Notable alumni ==
- Robin Zander, lead vocalist and rhythm guitarist for Cheap Trick
