= Rockford Park District =

Park district in Illinois, United States

- Interactive map of Rockford Park District
- Location: Rockford, Illinois, United States
- Established: 1909
- Governing body: Board of Commissioners
- Website: www.rockfordparkdistrict.org

The Rockford Park District is a park district serving Rockford, Illinois, and surrounding communities. Founded in 1909, it is governed by a five-member Board of Commissioners elected to six-year terms; commissioners serve as volunteers.

The district reports stewardship of 177 parks and facilities encompassing 4,896 acres, including 1,500 acres of natural areas. Its system also includes 82 playgrounds, 216 improved athletic fields, and 18 canoe and boat access points.

In 2012, the Rockford Park District received the National Gold Medal Grand Plaque Award in its population class. The award program is administered by the American Academy for Park and Recreation Administration in partnership with the National Recreation and Park Association.
