= Scott Hall (disambiguation) =

Scott Hall (1958–2022) was an American professional wrestler.

Scott Hall may also refer to:

== People ==
- Scott Hall, former bassist of the Christian rock band Bride
- Scott Hall (trumpeter), American jazz trumpeter, composer, and educator
- Scott S. Hall, psychology and behavioral science professor and researcher at Stanford University
- Scott F. Hall, the musician and luthier who codeveloped the Hornucopian dronepipe
- Scott Hall, bailbondsman and defendant in the Georgia election racketeering prosecution
- Scott Hall (The Venture Bros.), fictional character also known as Zero and Henchman No. 1

== Places ==
- Scott Hall, Leeds, a suburb of Leeds, West Yorkshire, England, United Kingdom
- Scott Hall, an academic building located on Rutgers University's Voorhees Mall in New Brunswick, New Jersey, United States
- Thomas Scott Memorial Orange Hall, building in Winnipeg, Manitoba, Canada
- Scott Hall, an administrative building on the Campus of Lafayette College, Easton, Pennsylvania, United States
- Scott's Hall, Jamaica, a town in Saint Mary Parish, Jamaica

== See also ==
- Darwin Scott Hall (1844–1919), U.S. representative from Minnesota
- Hall-Scott, an American manufacturing company
- Scot's Hall, a manor house in England
