= Lord Wandsworth College =

Public school in Hampshire, England

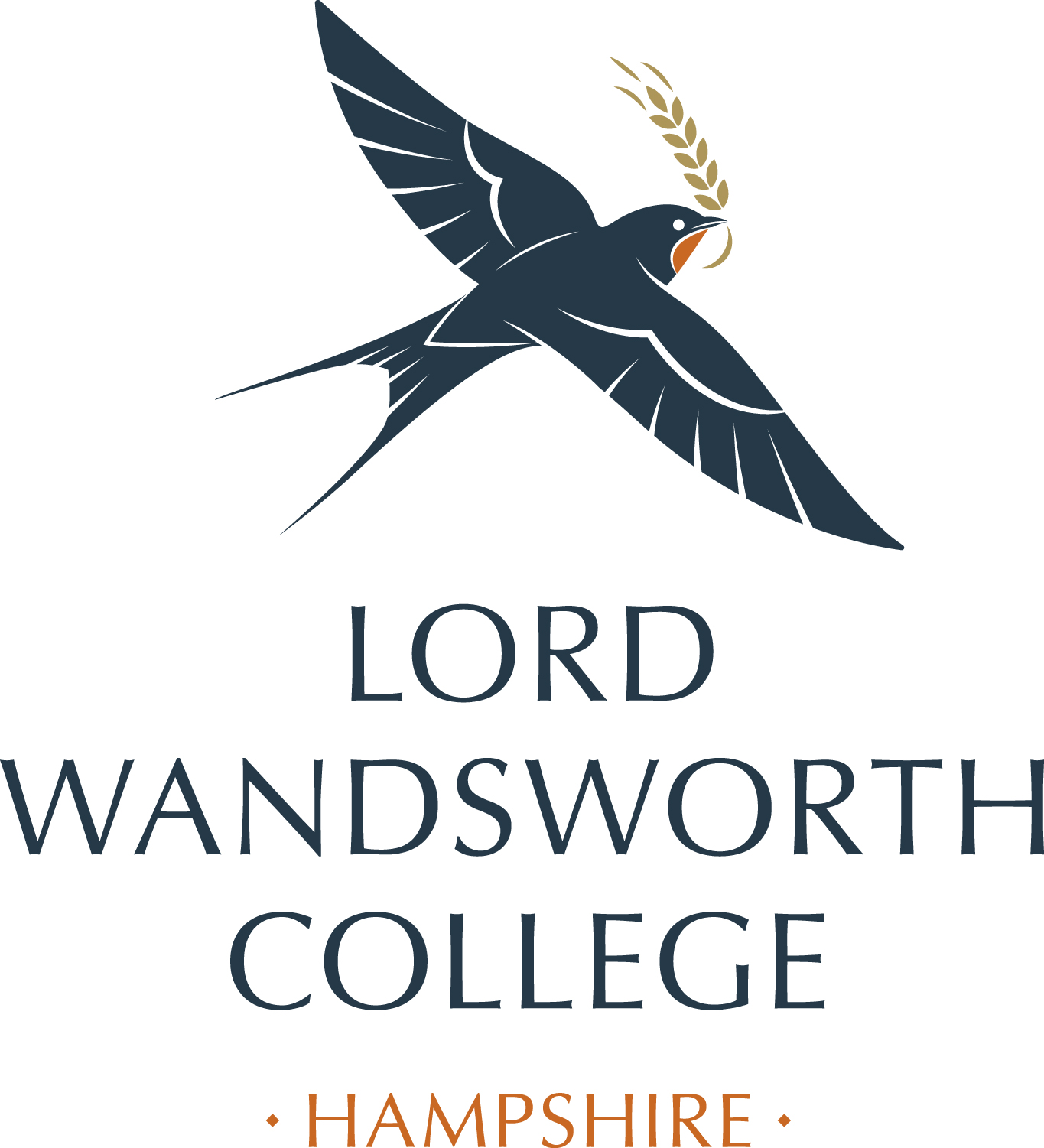

Location
- Long Sutton; Hook, Hampshire, RG29 1TB; England; 51.21442°N 0.92942°W

Information
- Type: Private
- Motto: Vincit Perseverantia
- Religious affiliation: Inter- / denominational
- Established: 1922
- Founder: Sydney James Stern, 1st Baron Wandsworth
- Sister school: St Neot's Preparatory School, Eversley
- Local authority: Hampshire
- Department for Education URN: 116521 Tables
- Headmaster: Adam Williams
- Gender: Coeducational
- Age: 11 to 18
- Enrolment: 710
- Campus size: 1200 acres
- Houses: Bramley, Sutton, School, Hazelveare, Summerfield, Gosden, Park, Haygate
- Colour
- Publication: The Sower
- Former pupils: Sternians
- Website: https://www.lordwandsworth.org

Lord Wandsworth College (LWC) is a co-educational private school in Long Sutton, Hampshire, England, for day and boarding pupils between the ages of 11–18, which occupies a 1,200-acre campus and is known for its charitable foundation. It is a member of the Headmasters' and Headmistresses' Conference.

Since 2015, the headmaster has been Adam Williams.

In 2020, the College was named Independent School of the Year for Student Wellbeing, and was awarded the Schools of Character Kitemark by the Association of Character Education.

In April 2021, the College announced that it had entered a formal collaboration with St Neot's Preparatory School, Eversley and legally merged in September 2025, bringing the combined roll to 1050.

At 436 hectares, its campus is larger than that of any other school in England apart from Winchester and Eton.

== History ==
The College takes its name from Sydney Stern, 1st Baron Wandsworth, whose bequest established the school. Stern, a Liberal MP, wished to provide an education and supportive boarding environment to children, primarily from farming families, who had lost the support of one or both of their parents.

Eight years after Stern's death in 1912, The Lord Wandsworth Preparatory School (Gosden House, Bramley) opened. In November 1922, the first pupils, known as Foundationers, began attending Lord Wandsworth Agriculture College on the current site in the village of Long Sutton. In 1938, the school's name was changed to Lord Wandsworth College and fee-paying students were welcomed to the College in 1946.

In 1988, the College began admitting female pupils into the Sixth Form, and in 1997 went fully co-educational.

On 4th May 2025, a former pupil committed suicide. In the inquest into his death, the court was told that the college had a "bully or be bullied" culture.

== Notable former pupils ==
- Charlie Amesbury, rugby union player
- Michael Bates, cricketer
- Oscar Beard, rugby union player
- Grace Blakeley, political commentator, journalist and author
- Will Buxton, journalist and broadcaster
- Callum Cant, author, researcher and labour rights advocate
- Sir Peter Coulson, High Court judge
- Louis Foster, Indycar driver and IndyNXT champion
- Scott S. Hall, Professor, Stanford University School of Medicine
- George 'Johnny' Johnson, RAF officer with the “Dambusters”
- Ugo Monye, rugby union international and broadcaster
- David Pownall
- Peter Richards, rugby union international
- Julian Sands, actor
- Keith Wheatley, cricketer
- Rupert Whitaker, co-founder of the Terrence Higgins Trust
- Jonny Wilkinson, rugby union international
- Ryan Wilson, rugby union international
- Roger Bootle-Wilbraham, 7th Baron Skelmersdale, British politician and Conservative member of the House of Lords
