= Hononegah Community High School =

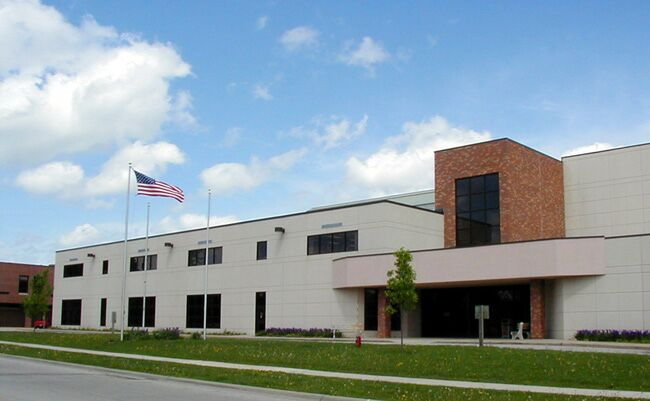

Location
- 307 Salem Street; Rockton, Illinois 61072; United States; 42.454°N 89.0632°W

Information
- School type: Public Secondary
- Established: 1923
- School district: Hononegah Community High School District 207
- Superintendent: Dr. Ehren Jarrett
- CEEB code: 143735
- Principal: Chad Dougherty
- Staff: 221
- Teaching staff: 111.90 (FTE)
- Grades: 9–12
- Gender: Coed
- Enrollment: 1,865 (2023-2024)
- Average class size: 24
- Student to teacher ratio: 16.67
- Campus type: Suburban
- Colors: Purple; Gold
- Slogan: "Scholarship. Citizenship. Leadership."
- Fight song: On, Wisconsin!
- Athletics conference: (NIC-10)
- Mascot: Indian
- Nickname: Indians
- Newspaper: HCHS Today
- Yearbook: The Mack
- Website: Official School Website

Hononegah Community High School is a public high school in Rockton, Illinois and is the only high school comprising Hononegah Community High School District 207. Located between Rockford and the southern border of Wisconsin, the school serves students from the towns of Rockton, Roscoe, Shirland, and parts of South Beloit. Specifically, the school districts Kinnikinnick School District 131, Prairie Hill School District 133, Rockton School District 140, and Shirland School District 134 all feed into the high school.

Hononegah Community High School opened in 1923. The school is named after the Native American Hononegah, wife of Stephen Mack Jr. Stephen Mack Jr. is credited to the founding of Rockton, Illinois. The school's namesake is honored with a large mural of Hononegah in the school's main lobby.

One of the unique aspects of Hononegah was its inflatable "bubble" field house, the first of its kind for any Illinois public school, until its collapse in December 2015 due to a hailstorm. It was replaced by a field house in March 2019.

== History ==
Hononegah (c.1814–1847) was the wife of Stephen Mack Jr. an employee for The American Fur Company, a pioneer to the Rock River Valley in northern Illinois and founder of the community of Rockton, Illinois. Hononegah had a strong influence on the Roscoe-Rockton area; the high school of the four towns and the main thoroughfare connecting the towns are both named after her.

== Athletics ==
Hononegah competes in the Northern Illinois Conference (NIC-10) and is a member of the Illinois High School Association (IHSA), which governs most high school athletics and competitive activities in the state. Teams are stylized as the Indians.

The following teams have finished in the top four of their respective IHSA sponsored state championship tournaments or meets:

- Football: semifinals (1996–97); 2nd place (1985–86)
- Volleyball (girls): 2nd place (2006–07)
- Wrestling: 4th place (2004–05, 2006–07)

Hononegah was also historically one of the drafting schools for the Rockford Icemen combined hockey program. Along with various other high schools in the area, Hononegah contributed nearly ten student athletes a year to the Rockford Icemen who, from 1997 to 2012, won fifteen consecutive Illinois state championships.

On March 6, 2020, the Varsity Boys Basketball team garnered nationwide attention after winning the Regional Championship on a buzzer beater that aired on SportsCenter's Top 10 plays the following morning.

== Campus ==
Hononegah is currently made up of two buildings: a large brick building, which houses academic activities, and a field house, which holds indoor sporting events and most athletic activities and classes for students, with the exception of the metal gym complex in the main building. Alongside the two buildings, the campus also contains a football stadium named Kelsey Field south of the field house, first opened in 1961, and a baseball field named Weber Field southeast of Kelsey Field, opened in 2003.

Notable additions to the base campus include a 1996 addition of a Performing Arts Center capable of seating 1,100 and an inflatable, athletic practice dome in 2002 which would later pop during a winter storm in 2015, leading to a field house in 2019.

=== Dome Collapse ===
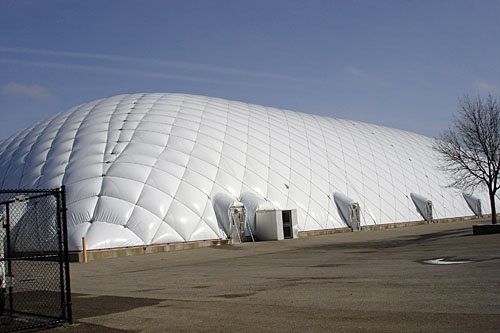

After an ice storm in December 2015, the 13-year-old dome collapsed. It housed several events for indoor track athletes, including practices and meets, practice room for all winter sports teams, physical education classes, and various community events.

The dome was designed by Air Structures American Technologies Inc. and cost $3 million at the time of its construction in 2002. It was meant to last 15–20 years.

=== Field House Construction & Opening ===
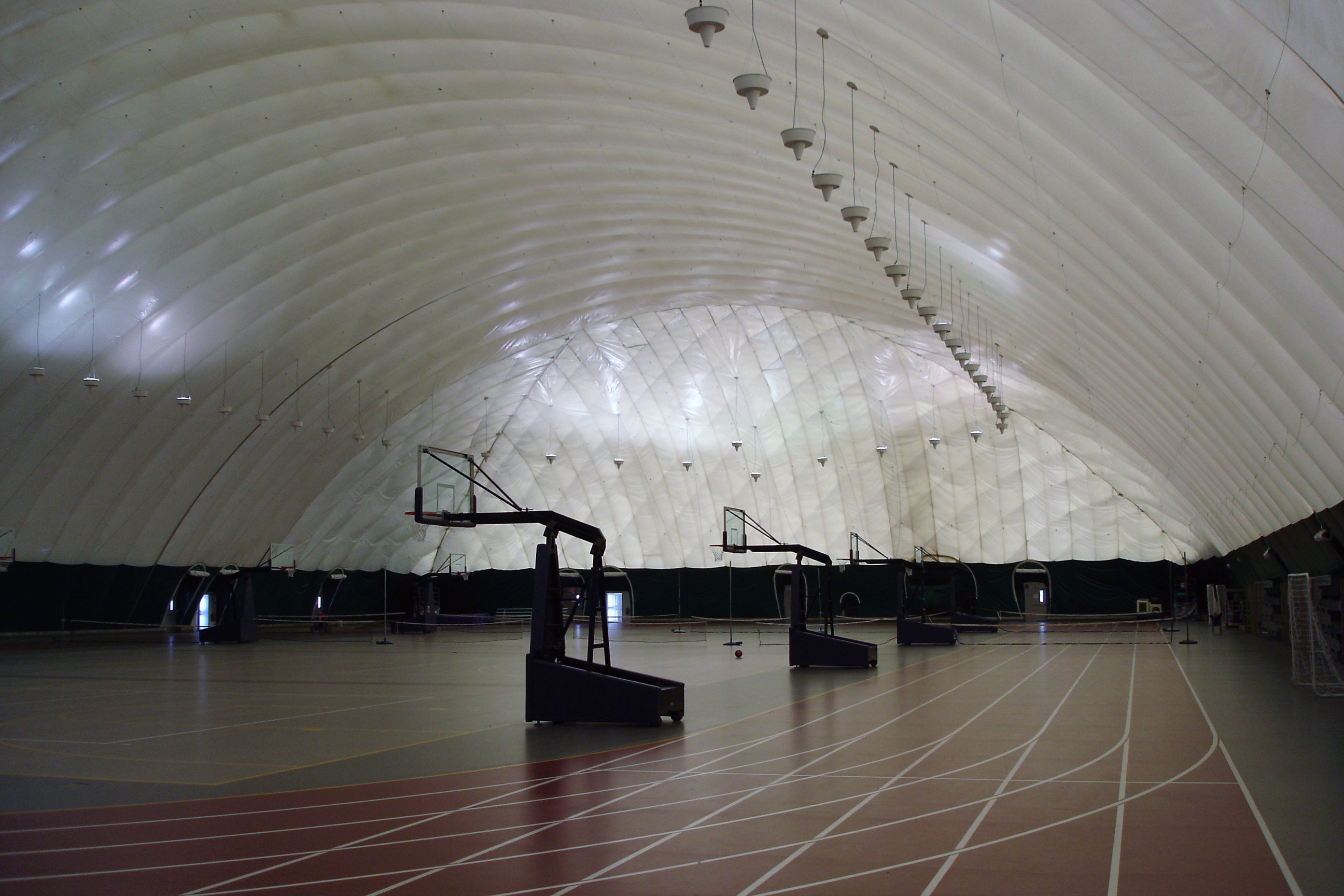

During the November 2016 general election, voters initially rejected a $44 million referendum that would increase taxes to supply funds to replace the dome and implement various other renovations throughout the school. After this rejection, a new $17.8 million referendum to fund the new field house was added to the April ballot which very narrowly passed with only 51% of voters approving the measure by a difference of 127 votes.

On November 7, 2017, a groundbreaking ceremony was held, signifying the beginning of construction. School officials say they fully intend for this space to be open to the public rather than only Hononegah students.

On April 5, 2019, an opening ceremony was held to officially open the field house. It started with a ribbon cutting ceremony and was followed by activities throughout the day.

== Awards and recognition ==
In 2008, the Chicago Sun-Times listed Hononegah as the 50th best public high school in the state of Illinois based on average scores on the PSAE, and one of the ten best outside of the Chicago area.

In 2010, Newsweek announced that Hononegah qualified for the magazine's 2011 list of the nation's top high schools.

According to the Illinois State Board of Education, Hononegah is a "Commendable School". This means that it doesn't have any under performing student groups and has a graduation rate of over 67%. This label has been assigned to the school every year since 2018.

== Controversies ==
=== Gay Straight Alliance ===
In 2007, a student-led initiative to create a Gay Straight Alliance club to address bullying was denied by school administration. Subsequent school board meetings to discuss the GSA were met by anti-LGBT protesters and media attention. After receiving guidance from the ACLU warning that restricting the club may violate the federal Equal Access Act, the school board voted 5–2 in favor of allowing the GSA club to operate.

=== Mascot ===
In January 2020, students created a petition asking the school board to change the school's mascot and logo, arguing that the Princess Hononegah and generic Native American iconography reinforces racist stereotypes. In response, another petition was created in support of retaining the mascot.

Citing the student protests at Hononegah, State Rep. Maurice West introduced bill HB4783 to the Illinois General Assembly in March 2020 which aimed to introduce requirements that schools must meet in order to use Native American imagery. The bill passed the School Curriculum and Policies Committee in a 13–8 vote, but remains sine die since January 13, 2021.

=== Lawsuit ===
In October 2024, a federal lawsuit was filed against Hononegah High School and several district leaders, including Principal Chad Dougherty, Athletic Director Andrew Walters, and members of the football coaching staff. The lawsuit, brought by a student referred to as "John Doe," alleges that the administration mishandled retaliation against him following his parents' report of eligibility issues within the football team. After the Illinois High School Association (IHSA) placed Hononegah on probation and required the forfeiture of a game due to an oversight, Doe claims he faced severe bullying, harassment, and demotion on the team. The lawsuit argues that school officials failed to investigate or protect him, leading to emotional distress and the loss of college athletic opportunities. Hononegah's administration has denied any wrongdoing and vowed to cooperate with the legal process.

== Notable alumni ==
- Corey Anderson (2007), The Ultimate Fighter Season 19 winner; professional Mixed Martial Arts fighter in UFC
- Nicole Briscoe (née Manske), news and sports reporter, Sportscenter anchor
- Scott Hamilton, figure skater, Olympic gold medalist and television commentator
- Julie Harshbarger, professional football kicker
- Danica Patrick, an auto racing driver, competing in IndyCar Series and NASCAR, with top 10 finishes in Indianapolis 500 and Daytona 500
- Mike Sorce, aka Don Geronimo, radio personality, nationally syndicated talk show; Class of 1976
- Dave Winters, State Representative and Assistant Republican House Leader, Illinois House of Representatives

== Gallery ==
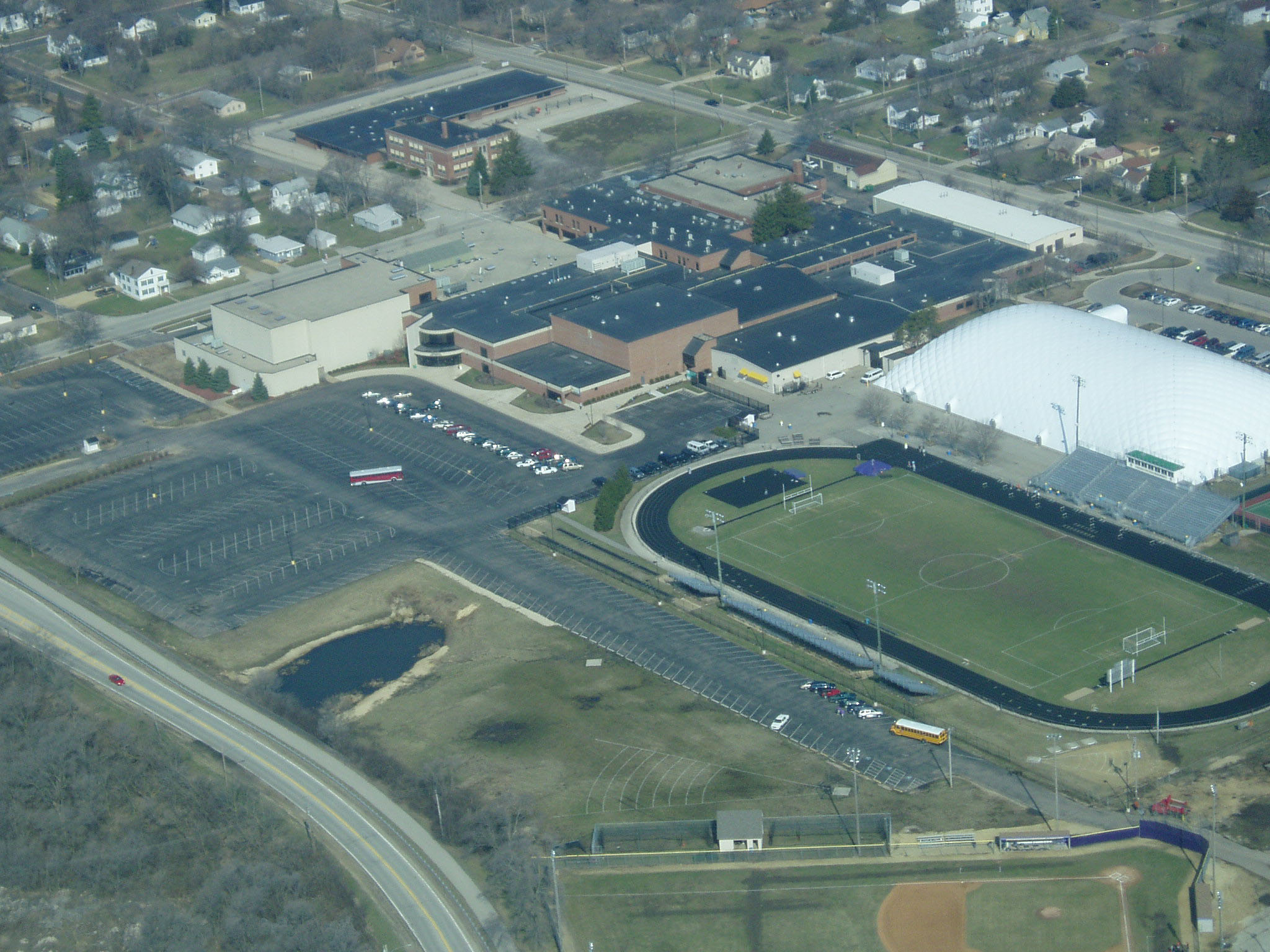
Campus from the air, 2008

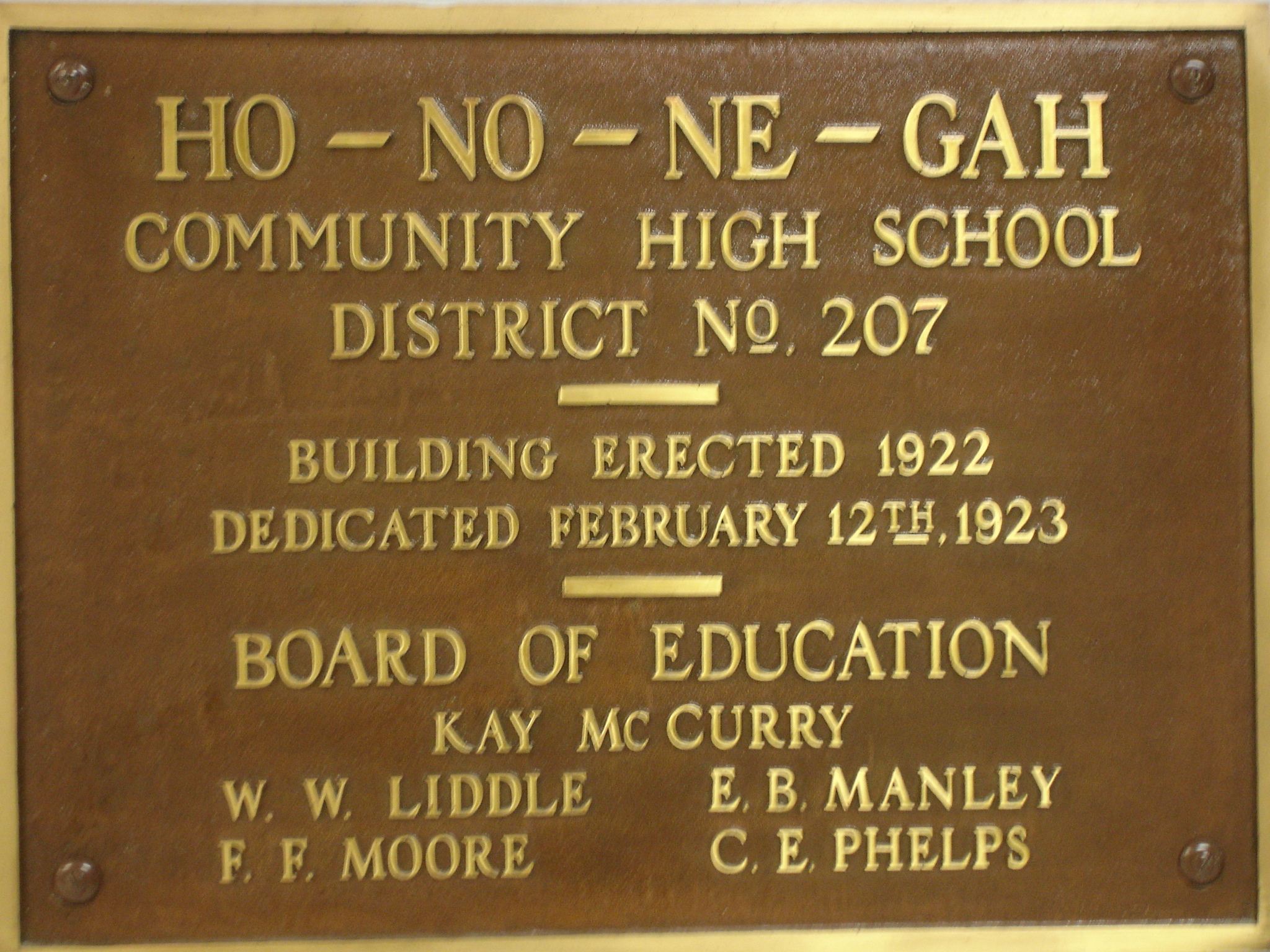
Dedication plaque from 1923

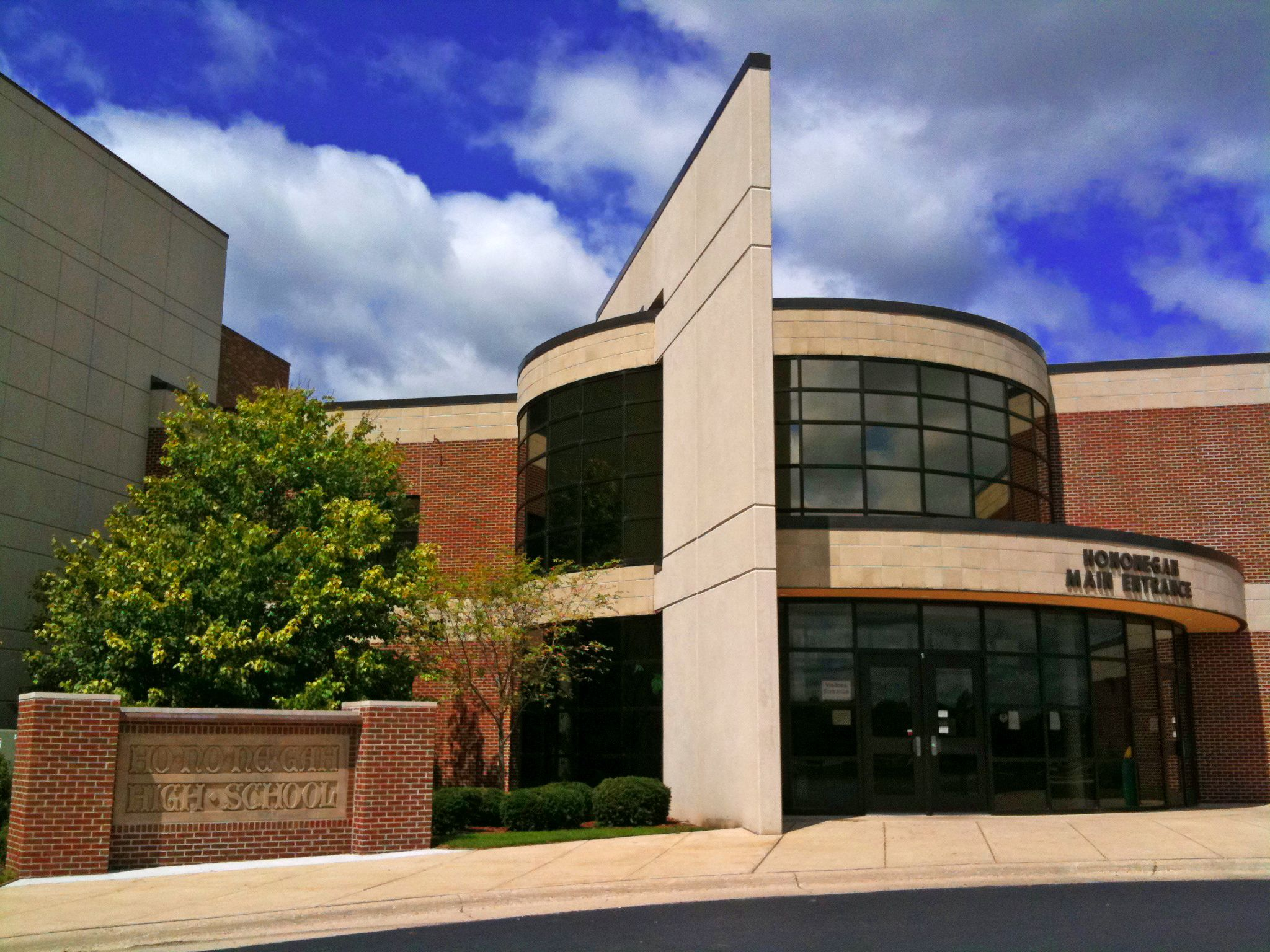
Hononegah Entrance

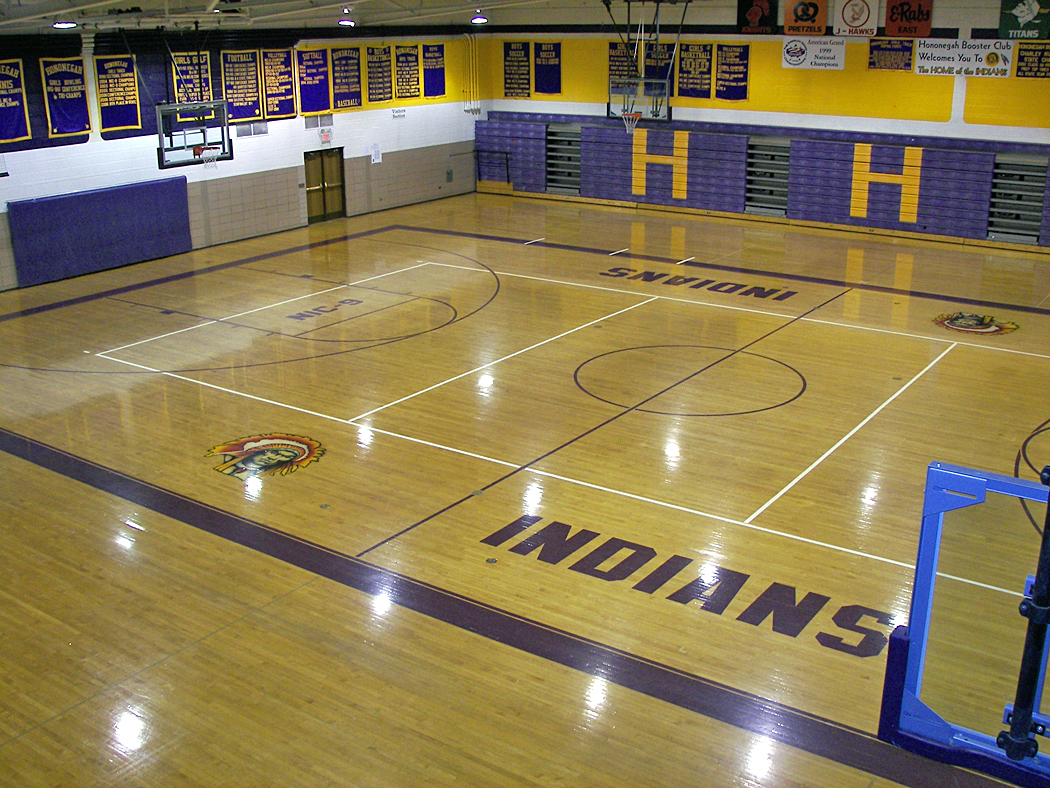
Hononegah Gym

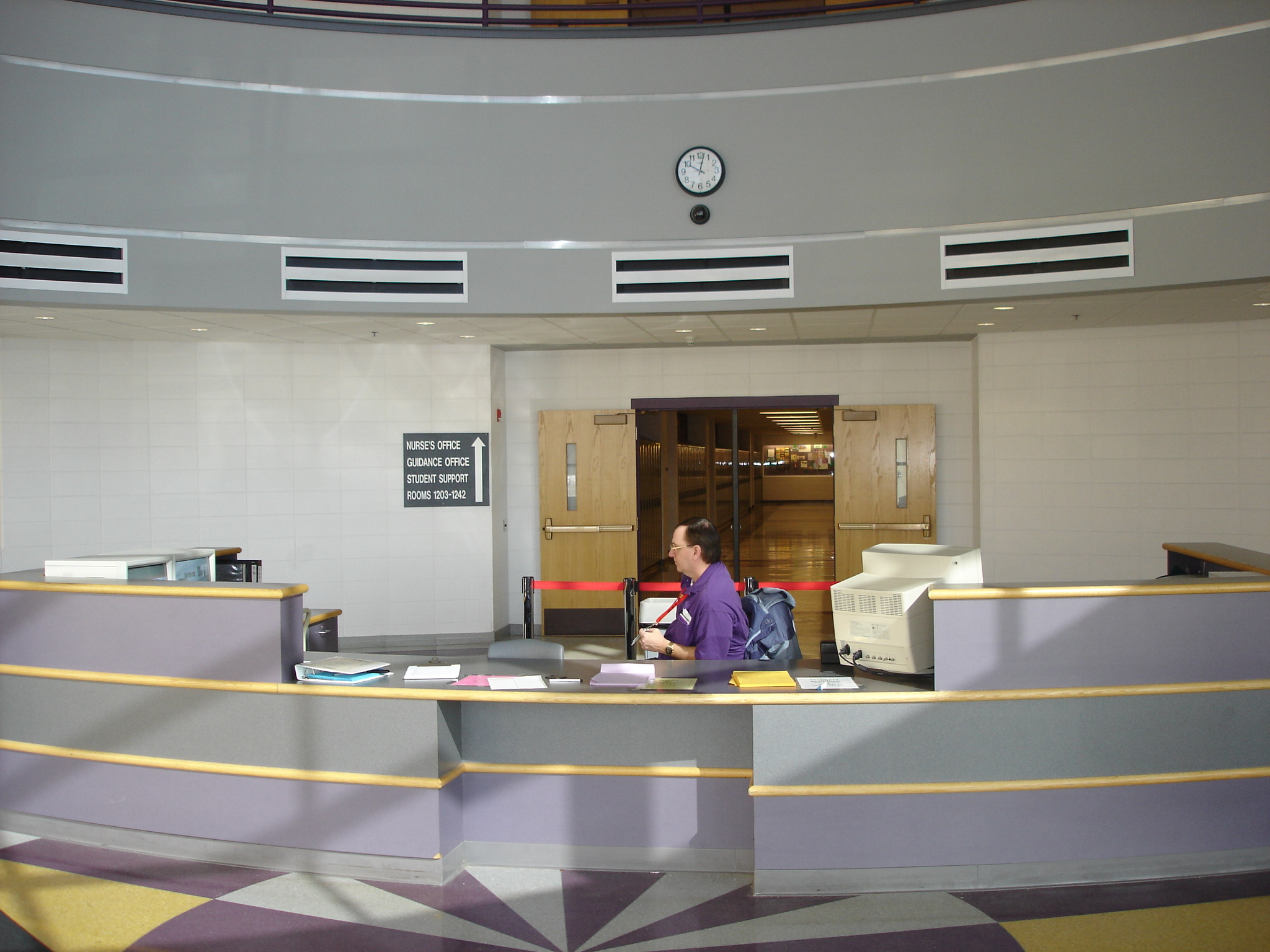
Hononegah Visitor Desk

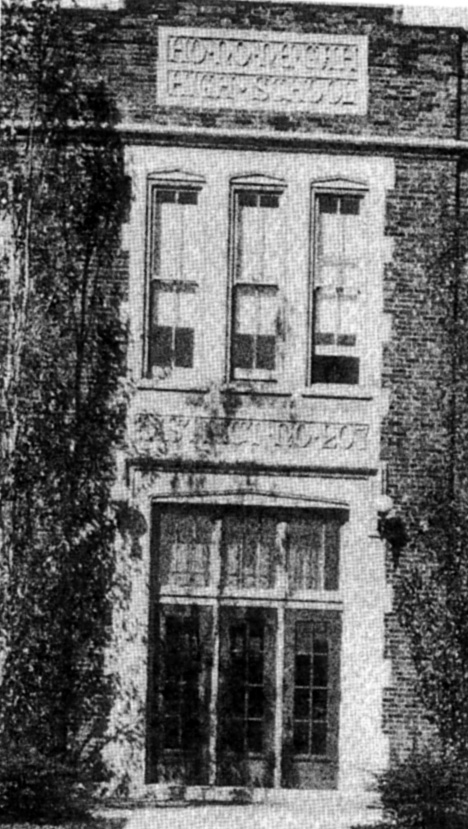
Early Hononegah Entrance

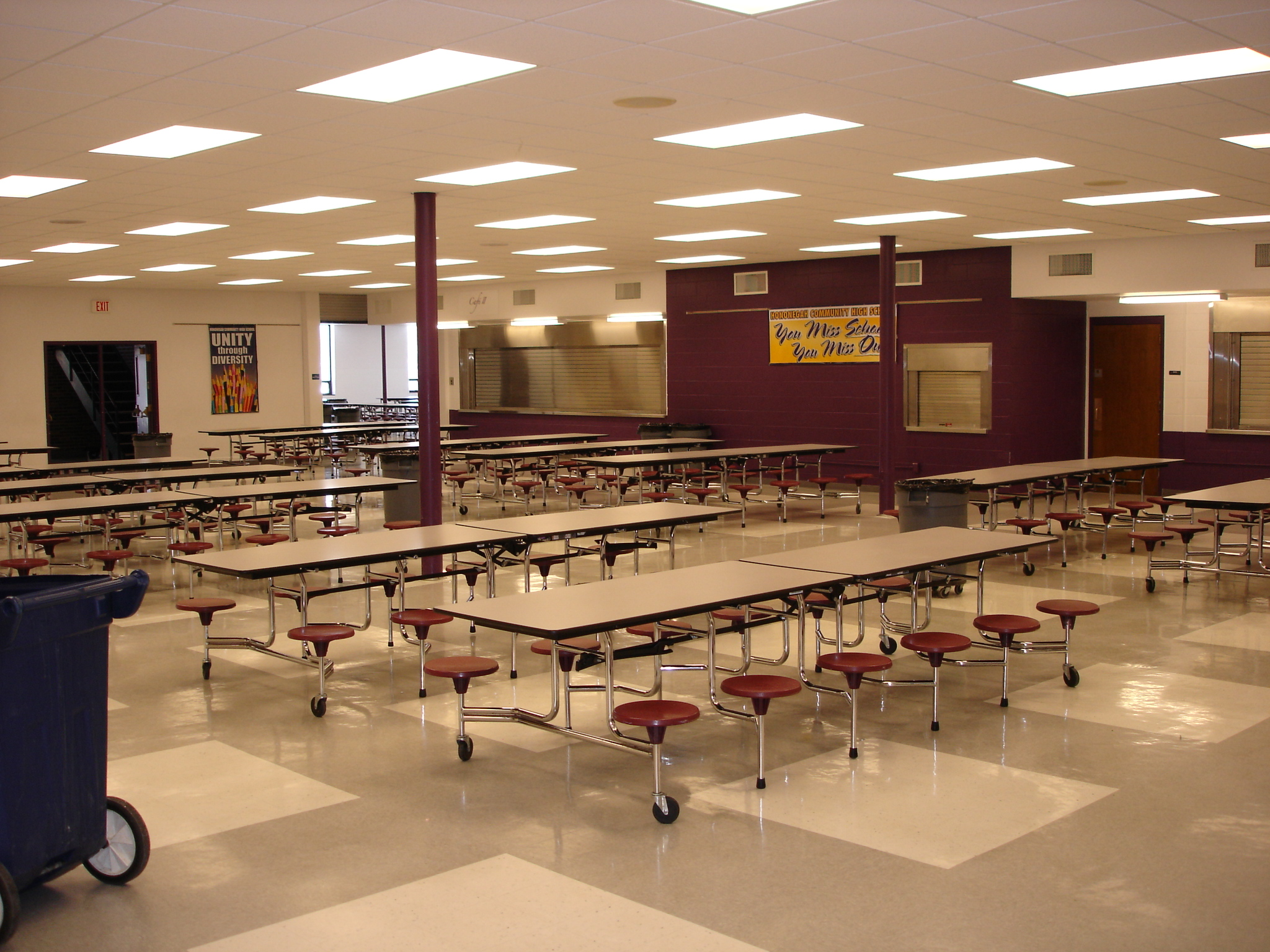
Hononegah Cafeteria/A.P. Room
