= Giovanni Battista Casali del Drago =

Italian Catholic cardinal (1838–1908)

His Eminence Giovanni Battista Casali del Drago
- Camerlengo Emeritus of the College of Cardinals
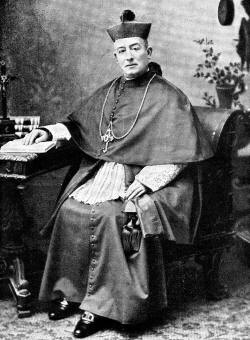
- Church: Roman Catholic Church
- Appointed: 15 April 1901
- Term ended: 9 June 1902
- Predecessor: Serafino Cretoni
- Successor: Francesco di Paola Cassetta
- Other post: Cardinal-Priest of Santa Maria della Vittoria (1899-1908)
- Previous post: Latin Patriarch of Constantinople (1895-99)

Orders
- Ordination: 22 December 1860
- Consecration: 8 December 1895 by Mariano Rampolla del Tindaro
- Created cardinal: 18 June 1899 by Pope Leo XIII
- Rank: Cardinal-Priest

Personal details
- Born: Giovanni Battista Casali del Drago; 30 January 1838 Rome, Papal States
- Died: 17 March 1908 (aged 70) Rome, Kingdom of Italy
- Buried: Campo Verano
- Parents: Raffaele Casali del Drago; Carlotta Barberini Colonna
- Education: Roman Seminary
- Coat of arms

Giovanni Battista Casali del Drago (30 January 1838 – 17 March 1908) was an Italian cardinal and member of the Italian noble Del Drago family. He was a second cousin of the Prince del Drago.

He came from an aristocratic family and was related to several cardinals including Antonio Casali, Savo Millini and Mario Millini. He graduated from the Roman Seminary, where he completed a doctorate in utroque iuris (civil and canon law).

He was ordained a priest in 1860 and went on to become a canon of the Patriarchal Lateran Basilica and private chamberlain de numero participantium of Pope Blessed Pius IX. He later became a canon of the Patriarchal Vatican Basilica and a prelate.

On November 29, 1895, he was appointed titular Latin Patriarch of Constantinople with residence in the Roman Curia. He was consecrated by Mariano Rampolla del Tindaro, the Cardinal Secretary of State of the Holy See. In June 1899, he was created cardinal-priest.

From 1901 to 1902, he was a Camerlengo of the Sacred College of Cardinals. He took part in the conclave of 1903.

He is buried in Campo Verano.

== Bibliography ==
Martin Bräuer, Handbuch der Kardinäle: 1846-2012 (Berlin/Boston: Walter de Gruyter GmbH & Co KG, 2014).
