= Mario Millini =

18th-century Roman Catholic cardinal

His Eminence Mario Millini
- Cardinal-Priest of San Marcello
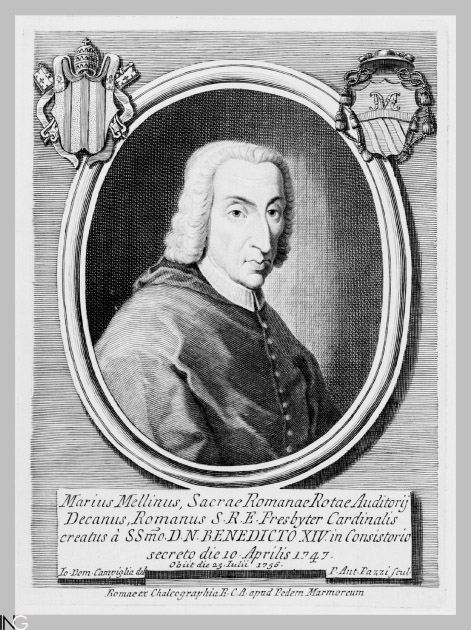
- Church: Catholic Church

Personal details
- Born: 9 February 1677 Rome, Italy
- Died: 25 July 1756 (age 56) Rome, Italy

Mario Millini or Mario Mellini (1677–1756) was a Roman Catholic cardinal.

== Biography ==
Millini was born on 9 February 1677 in Rome, Italy. He was related to several cardinals including Antonio Casali, Savo Millini and Giovanni Battista Casali del Drago.

He was promoted to the cardinalate at the request of Empress Maria Theresa of Austria.

He is buried at the Santa Maria del Popolo.

Catholic Church titles
Preceded by Silvio Valenti Gonzaga	Cardinal-Priest of Santa Prisca; 1747–1748	Succeeded by Ludovico Merlini
Preceded by Raffaele Cosimo de' Girolami	Cardinal-Priest of San Marcello; 1748–1756	Succeeded by Ludovico Merlini
