= El Diario (Mexico, 1906) =

Mexico City newspaper founded in 1906

El Diario: periódico independiente de la mañana was a newspaper founded in Mexico City on October 13, 1906 by Ernesto Simondetti and Juan Sánchez Azcona. It had an illustrated Sunday supplement, El Diario Illustrado.

It has been claimed that it was secretly financed by Enrique Creel.

Its writers included Frías Fernández, Larrañaga Portugal, Torres Palomar, and Jacobo Pratl, as well as the Americans Benjamin De Casseres and a certain O'Brien. Its artist was Álvaro Pruneda, along with the American caricaturist Carlo de Fornaro, who became the artistic director of the Diario Illustrado.
