= Prince del Drago =

Italian noble in New York City (1860–1956)

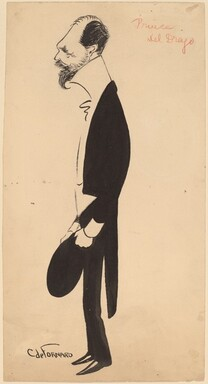
Caricature of Prince del Drago by Carlo de Fornaro, c. 1900

Don Giovanni Battista dei Principi del Drago, Marchese di Riofreddo (12 August 1860 – 3 May 1956), known in the United States as the Prince del Drago and Prince Don Giovanni del Drago, was a member of the princely Del Drago family of Rome, though not a prince in his own right. He was the fourth son of Don Filippo Massimiliano del Drago, Prince of Mazzano and Antuni and thus the second cousin of Cardinal Giovanni Battista Casali del Drago. On his mother's side, he was a grandson of Queen Maria Christina of Spain and her second husband, Agustín Fernando Muñoz.

Del Drago held Swiss citizenship. He married Emma dei Conti Lucich on 12 October 1887 in Rome. That marriage ended in divorce.

Their son, Don Marcello dei Principi del Drago, Marchese di Riofreddo, was the Chief of Staff of the Italian Ministry of Foreign Affairs from 1940 to 1943 and later the Ambassador to Sweden and Japan.

Giovanni moved to New York in 1901, and, on 22 May 1909, married Mrs. Josephine Schmid née Kleiner, the wealthy widow of August Schmid, the owner of Lion Brewery and much New York City real estate. Giovanni became a naturalized US citizen in 1913. Josephine died in Sanremo, Italy, on 8 October 1936.

Giovanni lived on 114 East Fifty-second Street in New York. He died on 3 May 1956, in Rome.
