= Benjamin De Casseres =

American journalist and essayist (1873–1945)

Benjamin DeCasseres
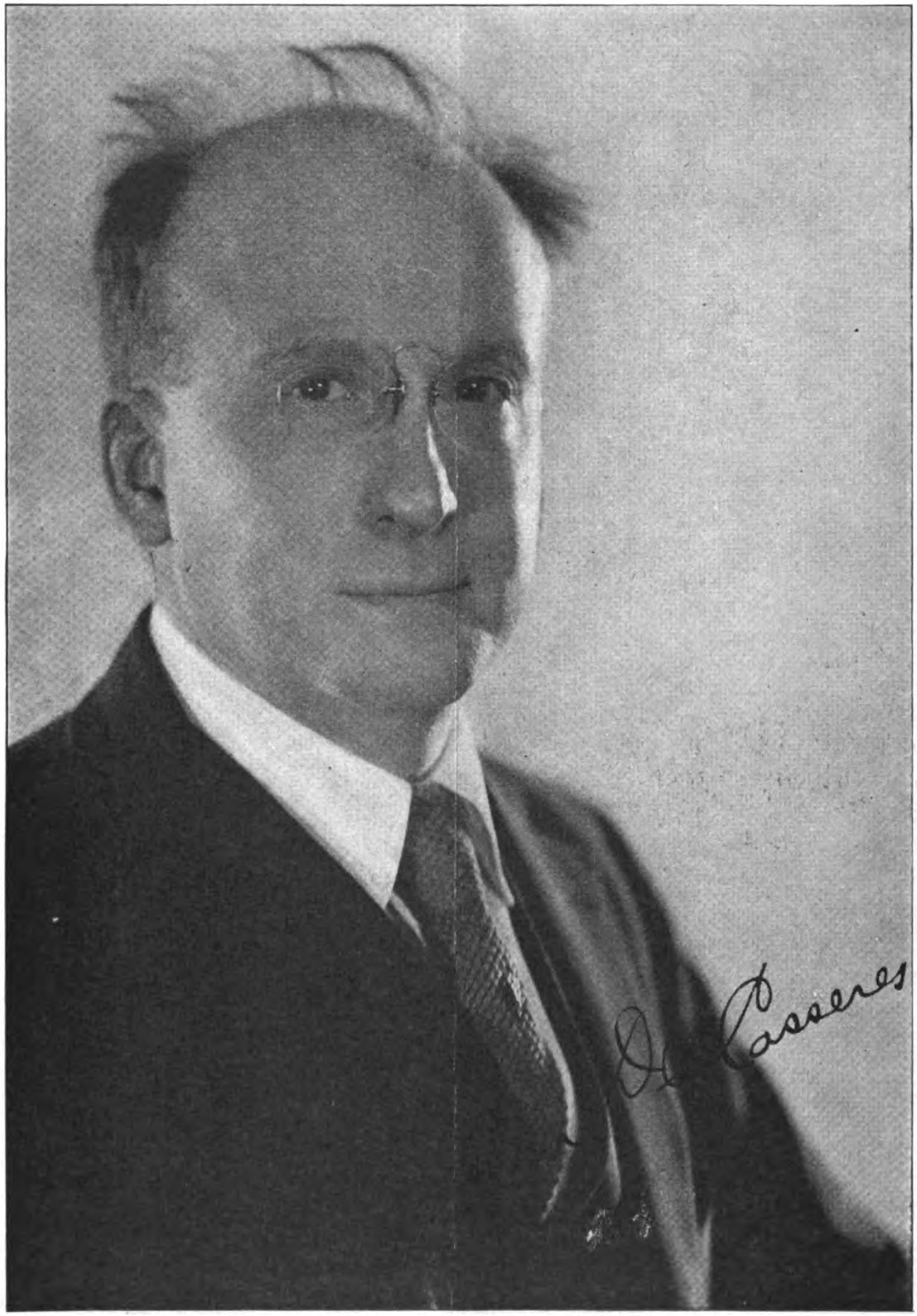
- Benjamin DeCasseres; Leslie's Weekly, Oct. 29, 1921
- Born: April 3, 1873; Philadelphia, Pennsylvania, U.S.
- Died: December 6, 1945 (aged 72); New York City, U.S.
- Resting place: Ferncliff Cemetery, Ardsley, New York, U.S.
- Occupations: Columnist; editorialist; critic; poet
- Spouse: Adele Mary "Bio" Terrill De Casseres (1919–1945)
- Relatives: Baruch Spinoza (collateral descendant)
- Writing career
- Subjects: Politics, philosophy, drama, movies
- Notable work: "Moth-Terror"
- Movements: Fin de siècle, Dada

Signature
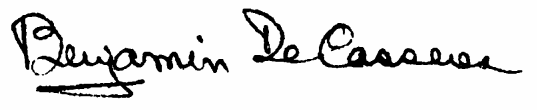

Benjamin DeCasseres (often DeCasseres; April 3, 1873 – December 7, 1945) was an American journalist, critic, essayist and poet. He was born in Philadelphia and began working at the Philadelphia Press at an early age, but spent most of his professional career in New York City, where he wrote for various newspapers including The New York Times, The Sun and The New York Herald. He was married to author Bio DeCasseres, and corresponded with prominent literary figures of his time, including H. L. Mencken, Edgar Lee Masters, and Eugene O'Neill. He was a distant relative of Baruch Spinoza and was of Sephardic descent.

== Writing career ==
At the age of sixteen, DeCasseres started working as an assistant to Charles Emory Smith, editor of the Philadelphia Press, for $4 per week. At the Press, DeCasseres rose from his position as an assistant to become a "copy boy," editorial paragrapher, dramatic critic, proofreader, and (briefly) city editor. During his ten years at the press, DeCasseres had a few publications, including one of his first signed editorials, an article that appeared in Belford's Magazine praising Thomas Brackett Reed.

In 1899, DeCasseres moved from Philadelphia to New York, he worked as a proofreader first for The New York Sun until 1903 and then for the New York Herald, where he remained until 1916. Although his employment at The Sun lasted for only four years, he continued to have periodic letters, poems, and reviews published in the book review section. He also wrote reviews for The New York Times and The Bookman.

DeCasseres' first notable work was an article on "Thomas Hardy's Women," which was published in the October 1902 issue of The Bookman. Upon receiving a copy of the article from DeCasseres, Hardy wrote back and thanked him "for writing so sympathetic an article." By 1904, DeCasseres was starting to receive notice in newspapers and magazines as having "an aptitude for saying clever aphoristic things." An essay on Hawthorn written in the same year and published in The Critic received a fair amount of attention, with portions of the piece being reprinted in various other publications such as the New York Times Book Review, and was cited in a Hawthorn bibliography published the following year. In 1922, some of DeCasseres's early essays were collected in his book Chameleon: Being the Book of My Selves.

In 1906, DeCasseres moved to Mexico City, where he worked on the newspaper El Diario along with his friend, the cartoonist Carlo de Fornaro.

In 1915, DeCasseres published his first book, a collection of poetry titled The Shadow-Eater, to mixed reviews. Blanche Shoemaker Wagstaff called the volume "a welcome tribute to individualism and defiance" and the poems themselves "metaphysical meteors, searching, cataclysmic and rich in satire." A review in The New York Times favorably compared DeCasseres to Walt Whitman, claiming "if his alien, highly individual genius remains unrecognized, criticism will lie upon the public, not upon him." Others, however, received it less favorably. Clement Wood, writing in the New York Call, mocked both DeCasseres' book and Wagstaff's review, writing, "It must be admitted that Mr. DeCasseres often uses good rhythms; what they are about is another thing. They are mainly about Nothing, as far as we can gather." By 1923, when the book was reissued by the American Library Service, a reviewer for Poetry wrote that DeCasseres had lost "the simple sincerity of utterance which is the birthright of the true prophet."

Starting in 1918, DeCasseres reviewed books for The Sun, the editor of which (Grant M. Overton) described him as having "a dramatic gift" as a reviewer. During the same period, he reviewed books for The Bookman, which advertised that "the best of Mr. DeCasseres's work appears in the Bookman" – to which The Sun responded with the claim that "the most glorious book review ever published on any page was Mr. DeCasseres's in Books and the Book World, of Broome Street Straws by Robert Cortes Holliday." DeCasseres also wrote humorous articles and reviews for the New York Herald and The New York Times.

== Politics ==
DeCasseres was interested in politics from an early age. His first signed editorial, published in 1890 when DeCasseres was 17, praised the administrative changes Thomas Brackett Reed had recently made as Speaker of the House.

DeCasseres described himself as a defender of American liberty and individualism, and supported the preservation of civil liberties while opposing collectivist ideologies like communism and fascism. While he supported capitalism, he also opposed "efforts of capitalism to monopolize the necessities of life". In October 1909, a letter to the editor of The Sun in which DeCasseres called socialism the "illusion of the twentieth century" sparked a series of responses in the same publication and others. His frequent comments against socialism peppered the articles that he wrote for popular magazines and journals as well. As a Hearst columnist, DeCasseres routinely railed against socialism, communism, and other forms of collectivism, and he excoriated those who promoted such political structures, including H. G. Wells, Upton Sinclair, and Franklin Delano Roosevelt.

DeCasseres was also a staunch opponent of Prohibition. He used his position as a well-known editorialist to criticize, often satirically, prohibition policies. In particular, he wrote about the effect of Prohibition on New York City, especially its ineffectiveness of actually preventing drinking. DeCasseres was widely reported as the first person to take a legal drink after the ratification of the Twenty-first Amendment, he having previously arranged to receive a "flash" telegram from Utah, the last state to ratify the amendment.

At various times DeCasseres defended free speech. In 1909, he signed onto a petition calling out the police departments of New York City, Brooklyn, Yonkers and East Orange for their respective activities in preventing anarchist Emma Goldman from speaking in those cities.

== Personal life ==
DeCasseres met Adele Mary Jones (née Terrill) in 1902. They were both staying at the same boarding house and only saw each other a few times before Bio (as she preferred to be called) moved West with her husband Harry O. Jones in early 1903. Over the next 16 years, DeCasseres and Bio Jones corresponded frequently, developing a long-distance romantic relationship, until Jones divorced her husband in 1919 and married DeCasseres the same year. They remained married until DeCasseres' death in 1945.

In 1931, DeCasseres published a collection of letters the couple sent each other during their courtship, titled The Love Letters of a Living Poet, which highlights the unusual nature of their relationship. In one of the letters, DeCasseres describes a dream in which "after thirty years together we were both cremated and our ashes mixed inextricably" and "cast into the depths of the sea" where eventually they are "returned to the ecstatic hermaphroditic union of a great biological-mystical fable."

DeCasseres died at his home on Manhattan's Riverside Drive at the age of 72. After his death, Bio DeCasseres published his final collection of essays, titled Finis, for which she wrote a brief preface. She also authored several works of her own.

== Social influence ==
DeCasseres held "an aggressively individualist form of anarchist politics derived primarily from a discomfiting reading of Nietzsche." His views on the idea of the Superman were influential on contemporary writers such as Eugene O'Neill, who called DeCasseres an "American Nietzsche" in the foreword to Anathema: Litanies of Negation, and Jack London, who wrote that "no man in my own [philosophical] camp stirs me as does Nietzsche or as does DeCasseres." In The Mutiny of the Elsinore, London named a character with a nihilistic point of view "DeCasseres" based on their mutual admiration for French philosopher Jules de Gaultier.

According to Marie Saltus, writer and philosopher Edgar Saltus would read the newspaper immediately each morning only if it contained a book review or an article by DeCasseres, although the two never met.

Artistically, DeCasseres has been described as adopting proto-Dada rhetoric as early as 1910.

== Bibliography ==
DeCasseres wrote a variety of articles, essays and books on a wide-ranging topics including criticism, international relations and philosophy, as well as drama, fiction and poetry, often adopting a fin de siècle style. DeCasseres was "an outspoken foe of communism" and, like fellow journalist H. L. Mencken, he was particularly interested in the writings of Nietzsche, having written several articles and books about the philosopher's ideas, including a foreword to Germans, Jews and France, a compilation of Nietzsche's correspondence.

The poem "Moth-Terror" is perhaps DeCasseres' most famous work. It was originally collected in the Second Book of Modern Verse (edited by DeCasseres' colleague Jessie Rittenhouse) and has been included in various other anthologies since then.

In 1935, DeCasseres self-published a three-volume collection of his work through Blackstone Publishers. Gordon Press reprinted the set in 1976.

=== Short works ===
- "A Conversation between George Bernard Shaw and the Dictionary," The Smart Set, December 1914
- "Variation on an Old Theme," The Smart Set, September 1917
- "The Resignation of New York," The Smart Set, October 1917
- "The Psychology of the Avenue," The Smart Set, May 1918
- '"Little Scenarios," The Smart Set, March 1920
- "Four One-Reel Movies," The Smart Set, April 1920
- "The Lost Satire of a Famous Titan," The Smart Set, June 1920
- "Queer Antics of Old Madame Ouija," People's Favorite Magazine, August 1920
- "The Caste of the Newly Educated," People's Favorite Magazine, November 1920
- "The Hamlet-Like Nature of Charlie Chaplin," The New York Times Book Review, 12 December 1920
- "Sub Specie Eternitatus," The Smart Set, June 1922
- "The Nietzschean Follies", The Smart Set, September–October 1922
- "The New Girl—I Hate Her," Metropolitan Magazine, February–March 1923
- "The Babbitts of Radicalism," Haldeman-Julius Monthly, November 1926
- "Five Portraits on Galvanized Iron," American Mercury, December 1926
- "A Woman for President!," Gay Book Magazine, January 1933

=== Books ===
- The Shadow-Eater (1915) - poetry
- Chameleon: Being a Book of My Selves (1922)
- James Gibbons Huneker (1925)
- Mirrors of New York (1925)
- Forty Immortals (1926)
- The Shadow-Eater (New edition, 1927)
- Anathema! Litanies of Negation (1928)
- The Superman in America (1929)
- Mencken and Shaw (1930)
- The Love Letters of a Living Poet (1931)
- Spinoza, Liberator of God and Man (1932)
- When Huck Finn Went Highbrow (1934)
- The Muse of Lies (1936)
- The Works of Benjamin DeCasseres (3 Volumes, Blackstone Publishers, 1939)
- The Works of Benjamin DeCasseres (3 volumes, Gordon Press, 1976)
- Anathema! Litanies of Negation (New edition, 2013)
- IMP: The Poetry of Benjamin DeCasseres (2013)
- Fantasia Impromptu & Finis (2016)
- New York is Hell: Thinking and Drinking in the Beautiful Beast (2016)
- Fulminations: Caustic, Capricious & Cosmic (2019)
- Spinoza: Liberator of God and Man & Against the Rabbis (2020)

=== Pamphlets ===
- Sex in Inhibitia (?, ?)
- Clark Ashton Smith (?, 2 pages)
- I am Private Enterprise (?, ?)
- What Is a Doodle-Goof? (1926, 4 pages)
- Robinson Jeffers, Tragic Terror (1928, Privately printed by John S. Mayfield)
- The Holy Wesleyan Empire (4 pages, 1928)
- The Hit and Run Thinker (1931, seven 10″x5″ strips of paper, staple at the top)
- Prelude to DeCasseres' Magazine (?, 1932)
- From Olympus to Independence Hall (1935, 4 pages)
- The Individual against Moloch (1936, 48 pages, Blackstone Publishers)
- The Communist-Parasite State (1936, 10 pages)
- Germans, Jews and France by Nietzsche (1935, 31 pages, Rose Publishers)
- To Hell with DeCasseres! (play, 1937, 16 pages)
- Don Marquis (1938)
- Finis (1945, 20 pages)

== See also ==
- Dada
- H. L. Mencken
- Individualist anarchism
- Sephardi Jews
