= Bio De Casseres =

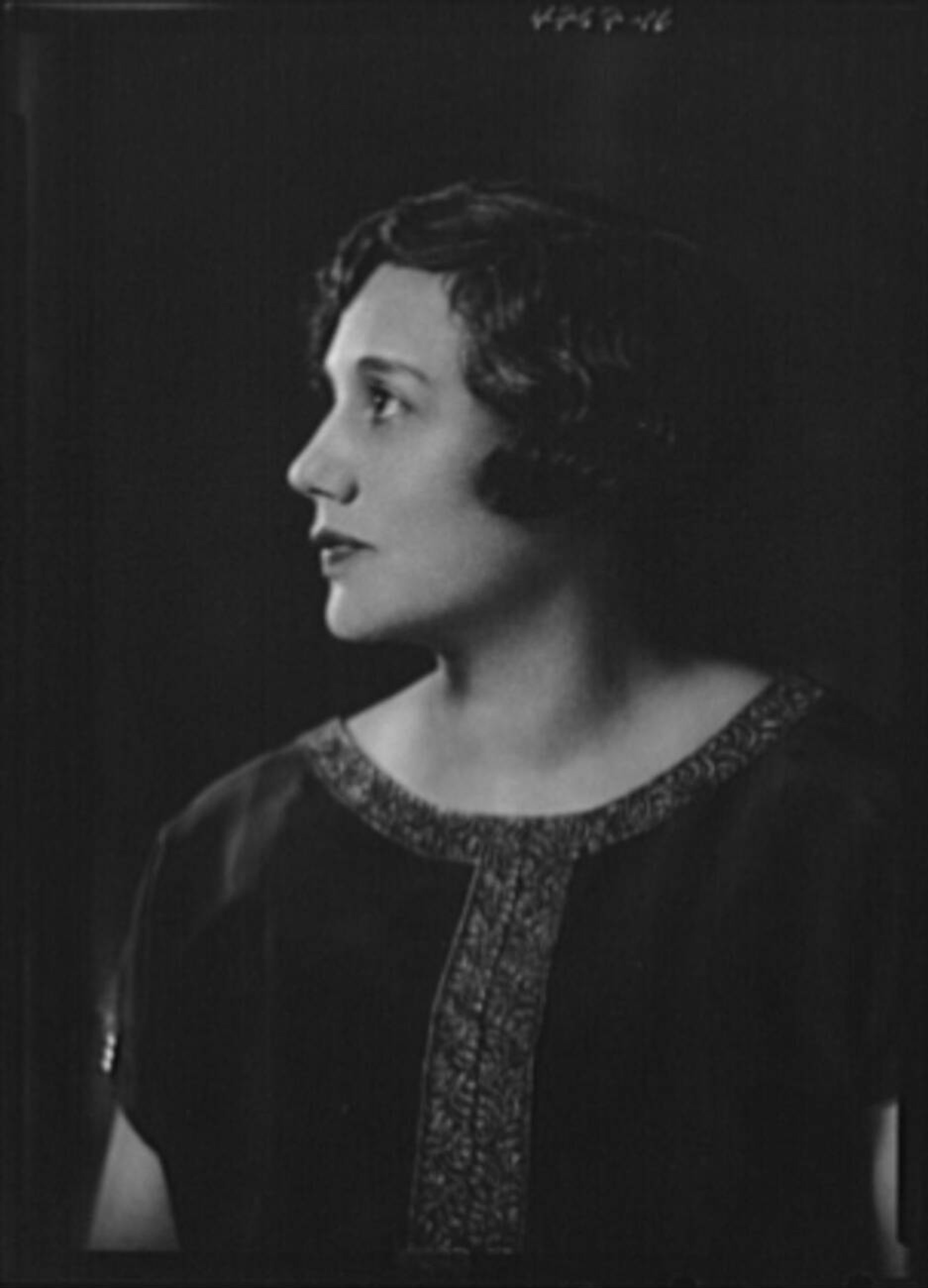
- De Casseres in 1925, photographed by Arnold Genthe
- Born: Adella Mary Terrill; May 4, 1875; Lake Crystal, Minnesota, U.S.
- Died: February 15, 1964; Tucson, Arizona, U.S.
- Occupation: Writer
- Spouse: Benjamin De Casseres (m. 1919)

Bio De Casseres (née Adella Mary Terrill; May 4, 1875 – February 15, 1964) was an American author.

== Early life ==
She was born in Lake Crystal or Blue Earth Reservation in Minnesota. De Casseres's grandparents (via her mother Mary F. Mack) were Stephen Mack Jr., an early Euro-American settler in Illinois, and a Potawatomi chief's daughter named Ho-no-ne-gah. Bio (the indigenous name she preferred to be called) was educated in Mankato before traveling to Pueblo with her sister Sadie to help their stepsister Matilda Provost. In Colorado she met her first husband with whom she lived in Tonopah. While accompanying her husband Harry Jones on a business trip to New York, she met journalist Benjamin De Casseres. For fourteen years they sent love letters back and forth without seeing one another. Eventually the letters affected her marriage and she divorced her husband in 1919. That October, she married De Casseres, who wrote for Hearst's New York Journal.

== Career ==
She wrote across a variety of media. In 1926 her Christian novelette The Boy of Bethlehem was published by the Christopher Press in New York. In 1946 she co-wrote the short play The Star Baby: a Fantasy in One Act, with Winifred Dunn. Writing in Spanish, Bio De Casseres also penned articles for CINEGRAF magazine (Editorial Atlántida), Argentina. She furthermore contributed to her husband's books The Love Letters of a Living Poet and Finis, the later of which contains a poem of hers called "Twilight."

Benjamin and Bio were acquainted with writers and artists living in New York in the 1920s and 1930s. They befriended playwright and Nobel prize winner Eugene O'Neill, among other writers such as H. L. Mencken, Zelda Fitzgerald, Don Marquis, Arthur "Bugs" Baer, William Randolph Hearst and Hype Igoe. In 1928 she helped O'Neil when he was depressed over his divorce. O'Neill asked De Casseres to "conduct a long-distance reading of his palm." De Casseres was a patron of writer and artist Clark Ashton Smith, buying drawings from him in 1934.

== Personal life ==
After her husband died, she moved to Tucson in 1946. In her will she gifted all their possessions to the Rockton Township Historical Society for "the use and benefit of the Ho-no-ne-gah and Stephen Mack Museum."
