= Keith Wheatley =

English cricketer

Personal information
- Full name: Keith James Wheatley
- Born: 20 January 1946 (age 80); Guildford, Surrey, England
- Batting: Right-handed
- Bowling: Right-arm off break

Domestic team information
- Years: Team
- 1965–1970: Hampshire

Career statistics
| Competition | First-class | List A |
|---|---|---|
| Matches | 79 | 10 |
| Runs scored | 1,781 | 53 |
| Batting average | 18.55 | 5.30 |
| 100s/50s | –/6 | –/– |
| Top score | 79* | 17 |
| Balls bowled | 5,208 | – |
| Wickets | 69 | – |
| Bowling average | 28.31 | – |
| 5 wickets in innings | – | – |
| 10 wickets in match | – | – |
| Best bowling | 4/1 | – |
| Catches/stumpings | 32/– | 1/– |
- Source: Cricinfo, 23 December 2009

Keith James Wheatley (born 20 January 1946) is a former English first-class cricketer who played as an all-rounder for Hampshire between 1965 and 1970.

== Cricket career ==
Wheatley was born at Guildford in January 1946. He was educated at Lord Wandsworth College, where he played for the college cricket team. Wheatley made his debut in first-class cricket for Hampshire against Leicestershire during the 1965 Bournemouth Cricket Week. He established himself in the Hampshire side in 1966, making 23 appearances. As an all-rounder, he took 31 wickets with his off break bowling in 1966, at an average of 28.80; as a consequence of the Test and County Cricket Board introducing a 65 overs limit to the first innings of some matches, Wheatley did not bowl in the first innings of any restricted matches in 1966. With the bat in this season, he scored 441 runs at a batting average of 18.37. The following season he made twenty first-class appearances, though was less effective with his off break bowling, taking 11 wickets at 34.09. However, he did find more success with the bat, scoring 532 runs and recording two half centuries.

It was in 1967 that Wheatley made his debut in List A one-day cricket, against Glamorgan at Portsmouth in the Gillette Cup. In 1968, his appearances in first-class cricket amounted to eleven, with 7 wickets; four of these came in a single innings against Glamorgan, when he took his career best figures of 4 wickets for 1 run. In 1969, he made nine first-class appearances and made his highest score with the bat, an unbeaten 79 against Kent at Maidstone. His final season for Hampshire came in 1970, when he made fourteen first-class appearances. In these, he scored 538 runs, with two half centuries, at an average of 25.61 — which was to be his highest season average. With the ball, he took 15 wickets at an average of 16.86, which was also his career best season average. In all, Wheatley made 79 first-class appearances for Hampshire. In these, he scored 1,781 runs at 18.55, with six half centuries. With the ball, he took 69 wickets at 28.31. In one-day cricket, he made ten appearances though he did not bowl; his returns as a batsman in one-day cricket amounted to just 53 runs at 5.30.

Outside of cricket, Wheatley was president of Farnham Golf Club and organised cricket matches between its members and the Southern Professional Cricketers Golf Society, which was made up of past and present cricketers. He later succeeded Mike Barnard as organiser of the annual reunion of past Hampshire players.
