= Carlo de Fornaro =

American artist and revolutionary (1872–1949)

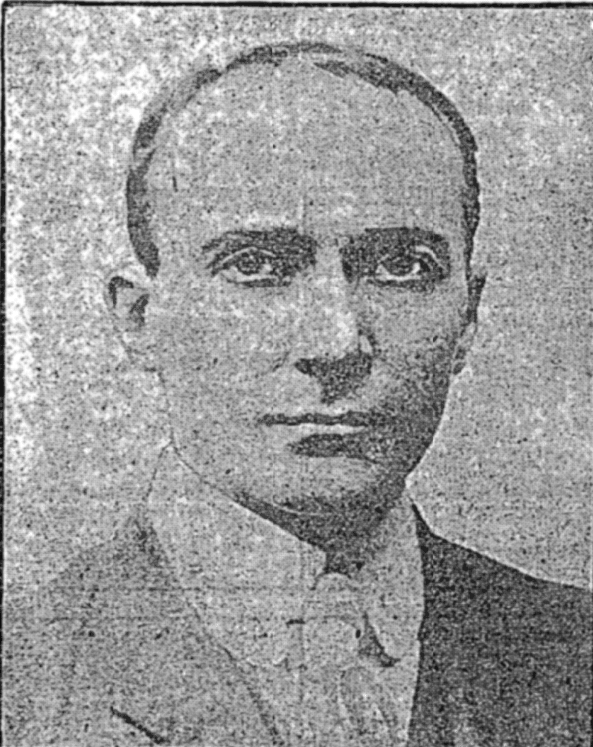
Carlo de Fornaro, 1910

Carlo de Fornaro (sometimes spelled Carlo di Fornaro) (1872–1949) was an artist, caricaturist, writer, humorist, and revolutionary.

His work is in the collection of the US National Gallery of Art and Harvard's Fogg Art Museum. His caricatures have been compared to those of Sem, Leonetto Cappiello, and Carlo Pellegrini.

His 1902 book Millionaires of America contains color caricatures of the captains of American industry.

== Life ==
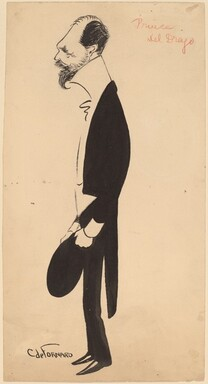
Caricature of Prince del Drago, c1900

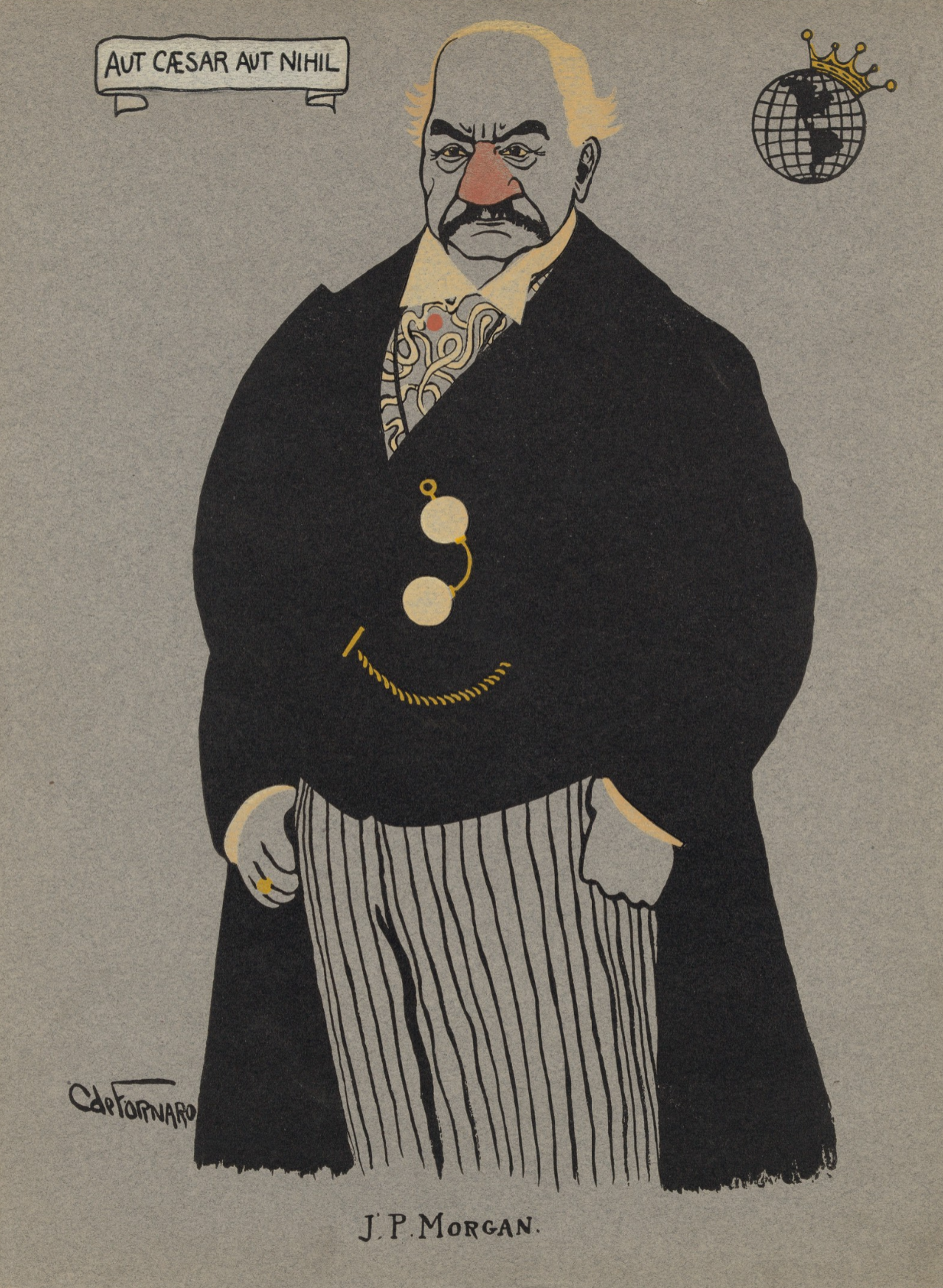
Caricature of J. P. Morgan, 1902

Fornaro was born in Calcutta to "Swiss-Italian" parents. He was raised in Italy and Switzerland, then studied architecture in Zurich and painting at the Royal Academy of Munich. He came to the US as a young man and began his career as a newspaper caricaturist, first in Chicago for the Times-Herald, then in New York for the Herald, Morning Telegraph, World, and Evening Sun.

In 1906, he traveled to Mexico with his friend Benjamin De Casseres. They became involved in radical politics, and joined the opposition to Mexico's president Porfirio Díaz. They joined the staff of the newly-formed newspaper El Diario, which opposed Díaz, with de Fornaro becoming the artistic director of its Sunday edition, El Diario Illustrado. He returned to New York in 1909, and published his Diaz, Czar of Mexico: an arraignment, which led to a trial for criminal libel against a nonresident by the editor of the Mexican newspaper El Imparcial. He was convicted and sentenced to one year in the Blackwell's Island Prison (now Roosevelt Island), where he served 8 months, and upon his release, was fêted by the Vagabonds lunch group of the National Arts Club. He was also invited to a dinner at Joel's Bohemia on October 4, 1910, and in that year drew caricatures for that restaurant's celebrity wall.

He documented his incarceration in the book A modern purgatory and advocated for prison reform. He was a member of the National Arts Club.

He died in 1949 after a year of poor health.

== Bibliography ==
- Carlo de Fornaro, Chicago's anointed: 16 caricatures, 18??
- Carlo de Fornaro (text and illustrations), Gem Legends for Marcus & Co., 11 brochures:

- Krishna's Gift, the legend of the diamond
- Prince Tissa, the legend of the ruby
- Amrita, the legend of the sapphire
- Vanadeva: the legend of the emerald
- Uttara: the legend of the turquoise
- Asneha: the legend of the opal
- Isvara's ring: the legend of the jade
- The necklace of untold sighs the legend of the coral
- The tear of Soma: the legend of the pearl
- The tears of Kusa: the legend of the topaz
- Shiva: "the Destroyer": the legend of the moonstone
- White lotus: the legend of the cat's eye

- Max Cramer de Pourtalès, Carlo de Fornaro, Millionaires of America, New York, 1902 full view
- Carlo de Fornaro, Diaz, Czar of Mexico: an arraignment, by Carlo de Fornaro with an open letter to Theodore Roosevelt, 1909 full view
- Carlo de Fornaro, Mortals and Immortals, 1911 full view
- Carlo de Fornaro, Carranza and Mexico, New York: Mitchell Kennerley, 1915 full text
- Carlo de Fornaro, What the Catholic Church has done to Mexico, Latin American News Association, 1916
- Carlo de Fornaro, A Modern Purgatory, New York, 1917 full view
- Paul Eldridge, Carlo de Fornaro (cover design), And the Sphinx Spoke, Boston: The Stratford Company, 1921
- Giacomo Casanova, Carlo de Fornaro (translator), Memoirs of Jacques Casanova, New York: Lieber & Lewis, 1923
- Carlo de Fornaro, John Wenger, New York: Joseph Lawren, 1925
- Carlo de Fornaro (translator), A. Zaidenberg (illustrator), The Arabian Droll Stories, New York: The Lotus Society, 1929
- Carlo de Fornaro, The Chinese Decameron, New York: The Lotus Society, 1929
