= Rockton Historic District =

Historic district in Illinois, United States

- U.S. National Register of Historic Places
- U.S. Historic district
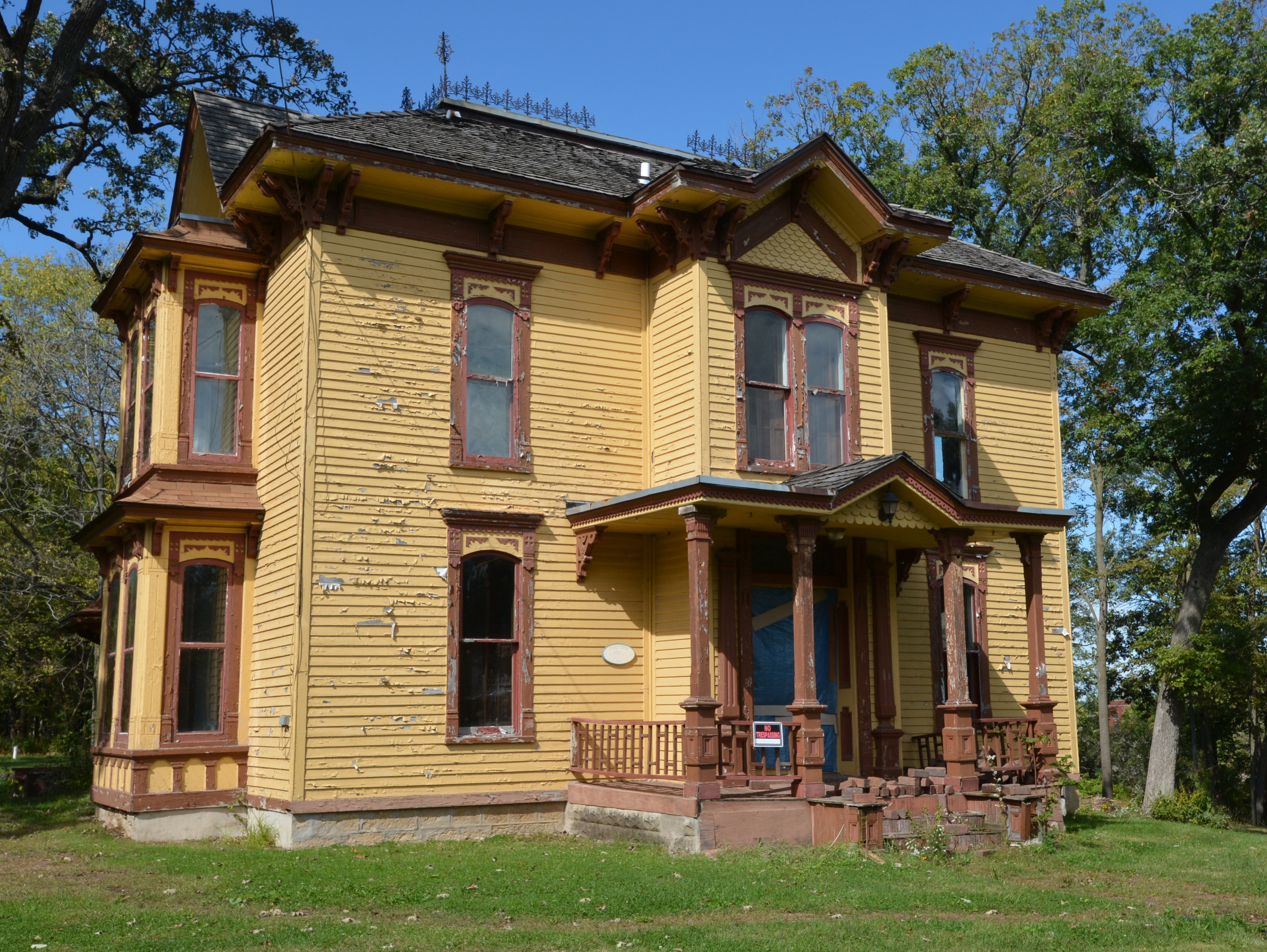
- George H. Hollister House

- Location within Illinois
- Location: Roughly bounded by River, Warren, Cherry, and West Sts., Rockton, Illinois
- Coordinates: 42°27′11″N 89°04′23″W
- Area: 152 acres (62 ha)
- Architectural style: Greek Revival
- NRHP reference No.: 78001202
- Added to NRHP: May 2, 1978

The Rockton Historic District is a national historic district which encompasses much of the village of Rockton, Illinois. The district includes 208 buildings, most of which are residential. The town's commercial district was purposefully excluded from the district due to its loss of historic integrity. Greek Revival is the only architectural style used widely within the district, with 51 buildings designed in the style. Rockton was founded in 1835 by William Talcott, and most of the village's development took place between then and the Civil War. This period of development coincided with an economic boom brought by short-lived steamboat and railroad projects; by the 1870s, Rockton had been bypassed by the major railroads and was losing citizens to its more prosperous neighbors, stalling its growth.

The district was added to the National Register of Historic Places on May 2, 1978.
