= Peter Coulson =

English Appeal Court judge

The Right Honourable Lord Justice Coulson PC
- Royal coat of arms of the United Kingdom

Lord Justice of Appeal
- In office 2018–2026
- Monarchs: Elizabeth II; Charles III

High Court Judge Queen's Bench Division
- In office 2008–2018

Personal details
- Born: 31 March 1958 (age 68)
- Education: University of Keele

Sir Peter David William Coulson (born 31 March 1958), styled The Rt. Hon. Lord Justice Coulson, is an English judge who formerly served as a Lord Justice of Appeal.

He was educated at Lord Wandsworth College and the University of Keele.

He was called to the bar at Gray's Inn in 1982. During his time at the Bar, he practised at Keating Chambers.

Originally appointed to the Construction and Technology Court, in 2004, he was then appointed a judge of the High Court of Justice (Queen's Bench Division) from 2008 until 2018, when he was appointed to the Court of Appeal. Coulson is also a contributor to the White Book, the Civil Procedure guide for practitioners.

Coulson retired as a Lord Justice of Appeal on 13 October 2026.

== Notable cases ==
- Goodlife Foods v Hall Fire Protection [2018] EWCA Civ 1371
- Murder of Ann Maguire
- Bates v Post Office Ltd (No.4: Recusal Application) Judgment by Coulson LJ on the application by the Post Office Limited to appeal the recusal decision, 9 May 2019 (A1/2019/0855), Court of Appeal https://journals.sas.ac.uk/deeslr/article/view/5363
