= Macktown Historic District =

Historic district in Illinois, United States

- U.S. National Register of Historic Places
- U.S. Historic district
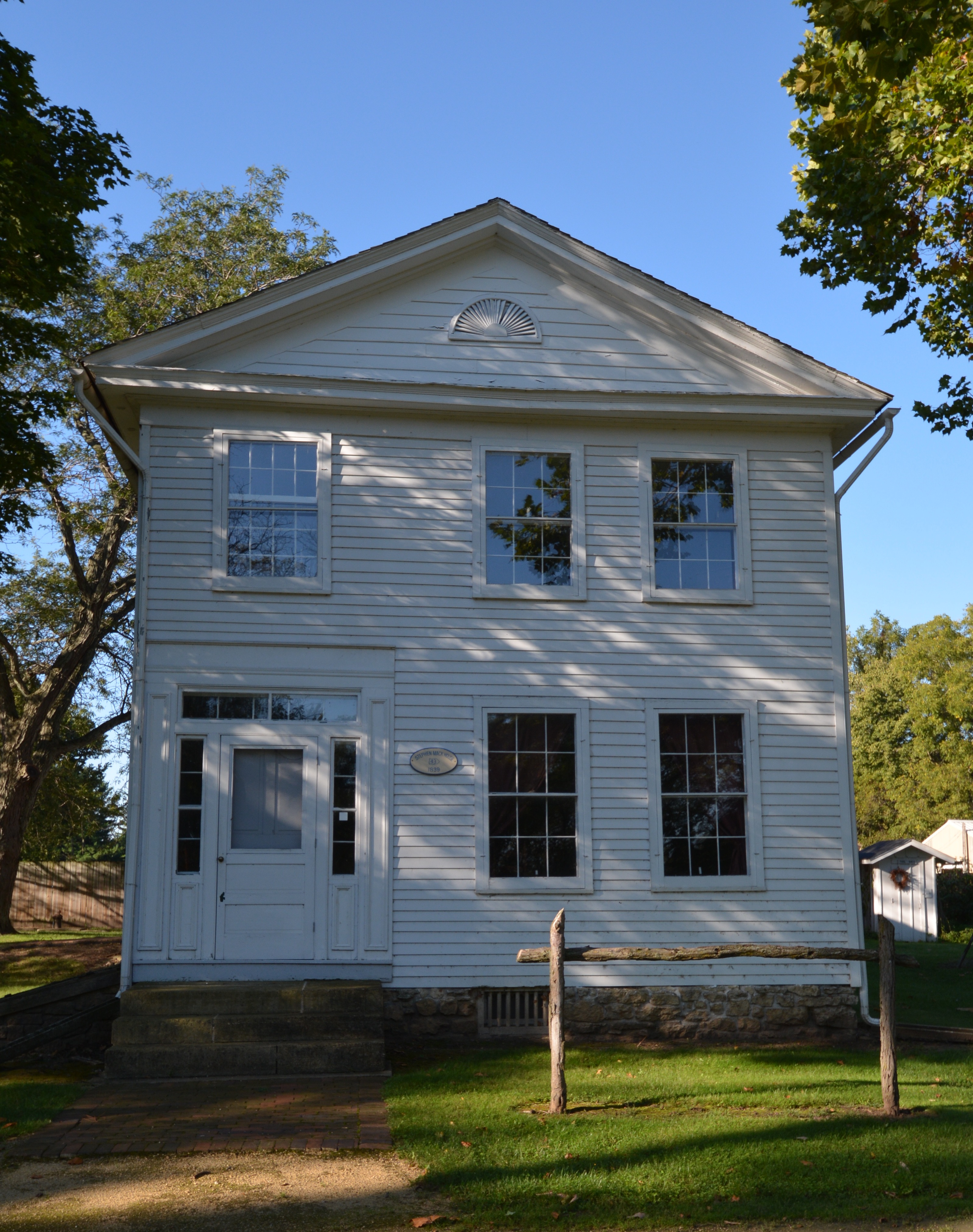
- Stephen Mack House

- Location within Illinois
- Location: West of Rockton on the Pecatonica River
- Coordinates: 42°27′00″N 89°05′17″W
- Area: 35 acres (14 ha)
- NRHP reference No.: 78001201
- Added to NRHP: January 5, 1978

The Macktown Historic District is a national historic district encompassing the remains of the Macktown settlement in Winnebago County, Illinois. Established in the late 1830s at the confluence of the Pecatonica and Rock Rivers, Macktown was one of the first settlements in northern Illinois. The community was a major trading post along the Galena–Chicago Trail and was the site of the region's first bridge across the Rock River.

Two buildings remain standing from the original settlement. The Stephen Mack House, a Greek Revival structure built in 1839, was the home of eponymous Macktown founder and Winnebago County pioneer Stephen Mack. The Whitman Trading Post is a limestone building completed in 1846.

The district was added to the National Register of Historic Places on January 5, 1978. It is located within the Macktown Forest Preserve and is managed by Macktown Living History.
