= Stephen Mack =

American merchant and politician (1766–1826)

Stephen Mack (June 15, 1766 – November 11, 1826) was an American merchant, patriot and politician. He was a member of the founding company of Pontiac, Michigan, and represented Oakland County in the First Michigan Territorial Council in 1824. He was also the brother of Lucy Mack Smith and so the uncle of Joseph Smith, founder of the Latter Day Saint movement.

== Early life and military service ==
Stephen Mack was born June 15, 1766, in Marlow, New Hampshire, to Solomon Mack and Lydia Gates Mack. His father noted: "There were but four families in forty miles...As our children were wholly deprived of the privilege of schools, she took the charge of their education..." In 1779, not yet 13 years old (his father called him fourteen), he enlisted with his father and older brother Jason to serve on a privateer in the American Revolutionary War. His father related one incident when:

My son Stephen, in company with the cabin boys, was sent to a house, not far from the shore, with a wounded man...A woman was engaged in frying cakes at the time, and being somewhat alarmed, she concluded to retire into the cellar, saying, as she left, that the boys might have the cakes, as she was going below. The boys were highly delighted at this, and they went to work cooking and feasting upon the lady's sweet cakes, while the artillery of the contending armies was thundering in their ears, dealing out death and destruction on every hand. At the head of this party of boys was Stephen Mack, my second son, a bold and fearless stripling of fourteen.

Mack served on this trip in March 1779, and then served in the American Army from July 25, 1779 until August 31, 1779 with his brother Jason. He was among those mustered in the Company of Captain Nehemiah Houghton, Col. Nichols’ Regiment at West Point. They were part of the New Hampshire Militia which joined the Continental Army. He served alongside his future brother in law, Stephen Bond, both engaged on July 13, 1780 and discharged October 21, 1780, serving as privates for 3 months, 9 days. He reenlisted, still aged only 15, for three years; serving from April 2, 1781 into 1783.

== Later life ==
Mack settled in Tunbridge, Vermont, where he established a store in town and a farm where he lived in the country. He had a son, Stephen Mack Jr., born 2 February 1798 in Tunbridge. He operated a tannery with his partner, John Mudget.

Mack moved to Detroit, Michigan, in either 1800 or 1807. He left his family behind in Vermont, where the children could be better schooled, and established a string of merchant and business ventures in Michigan. In Detroit during the War of 1812, he was given the captaincy of a company under General William Hull; however, the city was quickly surrendered to the British. Mack is said by his sister to have broken his sword over his knee and thrown it into the lake on hearing of the surrender. To save his property, his housekeeper housed British officers and pretended the house and business were her own.

After the war, Mack rebuilt his businesses. In 1812 he became a trustee of the village of Detroit and later a director and shareholder of the Bank of Michigan. He entered into a partnership which was known as Mack, Conant & Sibley, which remained in business until 1821 when it was bought out by its chief competitor, the American Fur Company.

Mack became a member of the Pontiac Company and helped found Pontiac, Michigan, in 1818. He had a farm and a building firm, as well as a sawmill and a flour mill. He is said to have, at his own expense, paid for the extension of the turnpike Woodward Avenue to Pontiac, then a major road in Detroit. He also built a sawmill in Rochester, Michigan, and had ventures in Ohio.

In the 1820s, Mack brought his family to Michigan. They briefly lived in Detroit before settling in Pontiac around 1822. He was referred to as "Major" by a neighbor and called "Colonel" in his obituary.

== Death and legacy ==
In 1826, Mack died after an illness of four days. According to his sister, he left an estate valued at fifty thousand dollars. Other sources report that an embezzlement scandal, involving the cashier of the Bank of Michigan, which lost the bank between 10,000 and 12,000 US$, and for whom Mack had been the bondsman, left the estate penniless. In fact, the Supreme Court case Bank of Michigan vs Stephen Mack was dismissed Dec. 17, 1828. The plaintiff presented a motion to dismiss as the case was abated by death of the defendant, and the motion was granted. His son Almon petitioned the Probate Court of Oakland County to be released from his duties as co-executor of his father's estate and it was granted. His brother John appealed the decision to the Michigan Supreme Court and the lower court ruling was overturned because Almon wasn't able to show cause to support why he should be released.

The major thoroughfare, Mack Avenue, in Detroit was named after his son, John M. Mack, in 1855.

== Sources ==
- The Revised and Enhanced History of Joseph Smith by His Mother. Archived version.
