= Scott Hall (trumpeter) =

American jazz musician

- Born: Rockton, Illinois, U.S.
- Genres: Jazz
- Instruments: Trumpet
- Education: Northern Illinois University (BM); DePaul University (MM)

Scott Hall is an American jazz trumpeter, composer, arranger, educator, and music producer. He works as a professor of instruction and director of jazz studies at Columbia College Chicago.

== Early life and education ==
Born in Rockton, Illinois, Hall is an alumnus of Northern Illinois University, where he earned a Bachelor of Music degree. He subsequently received a Master of Music degree from DePaul University.

== Career ==
Hall has performed at major venues and with several famous jazz artists, including Jon Faddis, Mel Tormé, Kurt Elling, Benny Carter, Joe Lovano, Lennie Niehaus, Lester Bowie, Roy Hargrove, Marcus Belgrave, Cedar Walton, Billy Taylor, Johnny Griffin, Ramsey Lewis, the Art Ensemble of Chicago, the Chicago Jazz Ensemble, among others.

He has recorded several albums with the "Scott Hall Quartet" beginning with Strength in Numbers (1999) featuring eight original jazz compositions written by Hall.
