= Hornucopian dronepipe =

3D printed musical instrument

brass instrument
- Classification: Aerophone
- Inventor(s): MONAD Studio with Scott F. Hall
- Developed: 2015

Related instruments
- Didgeridoo

Musicians
- Scott F. Hall

The hornucopian dronepipe is a 3D printed wind instrument. It was developed by Eric Goldemberg and Veronica Zalcberg of MONAD Studio together with musician and luthier Scott F. Hall.

== Background ==
MONAD Studio was created by Eric Goldemberg and Veronica Zalcberg in 2002. They are an architectural company. In April 2015, MONAD unveiled their "Multi" project, which they describe as a "Sonic Art Wall Installation". Originally consisting of a cello, violin and bass guitar, the instruments in the series are all fully 3D printed. The hornucopian dronepipe is the fourth item in the project and was also released in 2015. A fifth instrument exists, which is a didgeridoo.

== Design ==
The hornucopian dronepipe's design was inspired by pythons and strangler fig trees (species that are native to MONAD's home state Florida) as well as the didgeridoo. It was prototyped in wood and then modeled digitally. The design process took under a year.

The hornucopian dronepipe is printed in black colored polylactic acid; the printing process takes ten days. The instrument encircles its player with numerous tubes; MONAD used measurements of Scott F. Hall's body to ensure a good fit.

== Sound ==
Didgeridoo

The sound of a didgeridoo

problems playing The files see Media help?

The instrument produces a continuous drone when played. Being a large instrument, the hornucopian dronepipe produces low tones. Its sound has been likened to that of a didgeridoo or a low horn. According to CNET, the hornucopian dronepipe "is simultaneously somber and stately" while being "a little on the eerie side".
