= Hononegah =

Hononegah (Xųnųnįka)
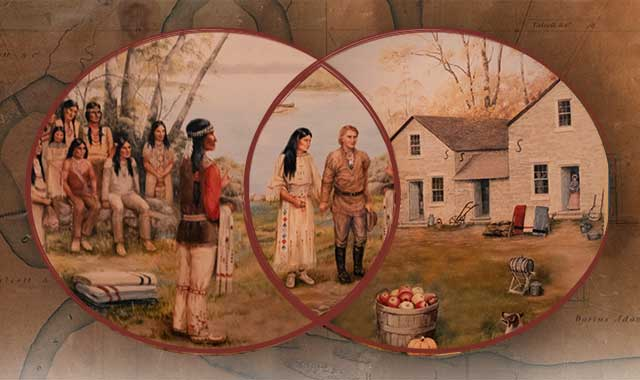
- Depiction of the marriage of Hononegah and Stephen Mack Jr.

Potawatomi, Ho-Chunk leader

Personal details
- Born: 1814 Teejopera (day-jope-ra, "Four Lakes Country"), modern day Madison, Wisconsin
- Died: September 8, 1847 (aged 32–33)
- Spouse: Stephen Mack Jr.
- Relations: Sister, Wehunsegah; uncles Conosaipkah, Estche-eshesheek, and Horohonkak; granddaughter Bio De Casseres
- Children: 11, including Rosa, Myrtle Matilda, Mary F.
- Parent(s): Father, "Blacksmith" mother, Inoquer

Hononegah or Xųnųnįka (c.1814–1847) was the wife of Stephen Mack Jr., an employee for the American Fur Company, a pioneer to the Rock River Valley in northern Illinois and founder of the community of Rockton, Illinois. Hononegah had a strong influence on the Roscoe-Rockton area; the high school of the four towns (the other two being Shirland and Harrison) and the main thoroughfare connecting the towns are both named after her.

== Biography ==
Most of what is known about Hononegah is printed in Edson I. Carr's history of Rockton, which was published in 1898. Modern scholarship, however, has discovered more about her background, and has cast doubt on several of Carr's claims.

Hononegah (from the Ho-Chunk hinu, a designation that she was the eldest daughter of her family, ni, "water", and -ga which clarifies it's a name) was born in the Teejopera (day-jope-ra), or "Four Lakes Country", which is modern day Madison, Wisconsin. This is given as her birthplace by N. W. Jipson. She is first recorded as living in a village along the Rock River in what is now Ogle County, Illinois, and at the time of her birth, there is no evidence of the Ho-Chunk living in this area until 1824 when Thomas Forsyth reports the existence of twelve to fourteen Ho-Chunk villages located on the Rock River and its tributaries south of Lake Koshkonong.

Hononegah was portrayed by Carr as a Potawatomi princess and a daughter of a chief. Her father, known only by his English name "Blacksmith", was at least half Ho-Chunk and part Potawatomi. Her mother was named Inoquer, and was pure Winnebago. She had one sister, Wehunsegah. After the death of her father and mother, Hononegah and her sister were raised by her uncles Conosaipkah, Estche-eshesheek, and Horohonkak, and her family moved to Illinois to a Winnebago village on the site of modern-day Grand Detour.

=== Grand Detour (1820–1829) ===
Mack (1798–1850) arrived in Grand Detour from Detroit in 1820 and worked as a clerk in a trading post there. How and when Hononegah met Mack has not survived, only a vague tradition that Mack had become sick from fever and that Hononegah nursed him back to health.

Mack became somewhat of an advisor to the local chief, but it is believed he was despised by the inhabitants because he refused to sell alcohol and firearms to the people and had not taken one of their own as a wife. Several versions of the story survive, but all versions agree that the inhabitants attempted to murder him. One story indicates that on one occasion Hononegah hid Mack in a barrel, and in another story, Hononegah met Mack in the woods to warn him of a plot to murder him. Mack became so grateful to her that he decided to be her husband. The formalization of their relationship took place in or shortly before February 1829, when Mack bought a French trader's cabin. Mack would have been about 31, while Hononegah was just 15. They may have had a child who died at birth during the course of 1829. Their first surviving child, Rosa, was born November 14, 1830. Eight additional children were born to Stephen Mack and Hononegah: Mary born July 15, 1832; William H. born On September 14, 1834; Louisa born May 6, 1836; Thomas H. born February 9, 1838; Henry C. born December 1, 1839; Edward born December 3, 1841; Matilda born November 26, 1843, and Caroline born October 16, 1845. In 1840 Mack and Hononegah were married in Winnebago County, Illinois by William Hulin, Justice of the Peace. At the time Mack was concerned that if he were not legally married to Hononegah that his children would have difficulties inheriting his estate.

=== Bird's Grove (1829–1835) ===
Their problems did not end after their marriage. During the later part of 1829, they were forced to flee Grand Detour. They found their way to a Winnebago village at the present site of Hononegah Forest Preserve between the present Illinois villages of Rockton and Roscoe. The inhabitants pledged to protect them, and there Mack established a new trading post near where Dry Run Creek meets the Rock River.

On May 9, 1832, Mack and Hononegah were run out of their trading post by Black Hawk's warriors who were sent there to confiscate Mack's supply of gunpowder. At this juncture, there is another romance about how Mack hid out on Webber's Island and that Hononegah brought Mack food and fresh water until Black Hawk's warriors had left, but this story is doubtful. Mack served during the Black Hawk War from Chicago as a guide. After the hostilities ended, Mack and Hononegah returned to their trading post.

=== Pecatonic (1835–1847) ===
On July 25, 1835, William Talcott and his son Thomas visited Mack at his trading post. It was then that Mack announced his intentions to found a community on the south bluff overlooking the confluence of the Rock and Pecatonica Rivers, which he wanted to name Pecatonic. The following autumn when the Talcotts returned to the area with their families, Mack had relocated at the site of his proposed community.

By June 1838, Jean Baptiste Beaubien, a veteran trader in Chicago, and John P. Bradstreet had become partners with Mack and began selling lots in Pecatonic. Mack made out very well in the 1837 treaty between the government and the Winnebago, and in 1839 he used some of the money he received to build a two-story frame house with a cellar. This house survives in what is now the Macktown Forest Preserve. The Talcotts lived north of the river where they dug a millrace and built a gristmill. They preferred to call the settlement Rockton, which eventually became the name of the village.

What little that is known about Hononegah comes from reminiscences of early settlers of Pecatonic and later collected and published by Edson Carr. She was highly knowledgeable in herbal medicine and was often called upon by everyone when they became sick. She liked designing her own clothes and decorating them with beadwork. Occasionally she outdid the white women with her fashion creations, and there was one dress that was so memorable that a description of it has survived. The settlers saw her wearing a white woman's garb on only one occasion, and she was so uncomfortable that she was never seen wearing white women's clothes again. There are also traditions among some Rockton families that when their ancestors were small boys, they paddled the canoe while Hononegah speared fish. Modern scholarship has succeeded to uncover the truth about her background but has done little to reveal any more about her life and character.

=== Death ===
Hononegah died on September 8, 1847. In a letter to his sister Lovicy Cooper, dated October 6, 1847, Mack describes her final illness and expresses a deep and heartfelt tribute to her:

"I have the melancholy duty to inform you that the death published in the paper I sent you was that of my wife. Her health had been failing for several months but was not so as to prevent her from taking the ordinary care of her family until she was attacked by what the doctor called a bilious fever but what I called a lung fever - of this she was sick eight or nine days and died. She was sensible to the last moment and took leave of her children and friends a few hours before she died.

"You say that by the notice in the paper you perceive she died a Christian. "If I know what a Christian is, she was one, not by profession but by her every act, her every deed proclaimed her a follower of Christ. In her the hungry and the naked have lost a benefactor, the sick a nurse and I have lost a friend who taught me to reverence God by doing good to his creatures.

"Her funeral proved that I am not the only sufferer by her loss. My house is large, but it was filled to overflowing by mourning friends who assembled to pay the last sad duties to her who had set them the example how to live and how to die." Years later William C. Blinn related that after Hononegah's funeral, "a little knot of neighbors were speaking of the loss. George Stevens, the postmaster, one of the parties, said most impressively, 'The best woman in Winnebago County died last night', the neighbors all nodding in agreement."

== Legacy ==
Today, the spirits of Hononegah and Stephen Mack live on in Rockton and the surrounding communities. There is Hononegah High School, Stephen Mack Middle School, Whitman Post Elementary School, Hononegah and Macktown forest preserves, and various other parks, buildings, and businesses that use the names Macktown or Hononegah. Among Hononegah and Mack's descendants is their granddaughter, the writer Bio De Casseres.

== Sources ==
- Bishop, David, History of the Forest Preserves of Winnebago County, Illinois.
- Carr, Edson I, The History of Rockton, 1820-1898, (1898, reprinted 1980).
- Clikeman-Miller, Diane J. The Old Settlers Remembered, A History of Phillips Cemetery, Macktown, Friends and Neighbors of Stephen Mack and Hononegah, (2000).
- Jipson, N.W., M.D. "Winnebago Villages and Chieftains of the Lower Rock River Region" The Wisconsin Archaeologist NS 2:125-139
- McAffee, Jim (ed.) Stephen Mack Letters, available at the Talcott Free Library.
- McMakin, Dean, Hononegah, A New Biography, (2003), available at the Talcott Free Library.
- Rowland, Katherine E. The Pioneers of Winnebago and Boone Counties, Illinois Who Came Before 1841, (1990).
- Schmaeng, Janice E. Stephen Mack and the Early Settlement of Macktown and Rockton, (1974), available at the Talcott Free Library.
- Waggoner, Linda M. "Neither White Man Nor Indian", Affidavits from the Winnebago Mixed Blood Claim Commissions Prairie du Chien, Wisconsin, (2003).
