= Rockton, Illinois =

Rockton
- Village
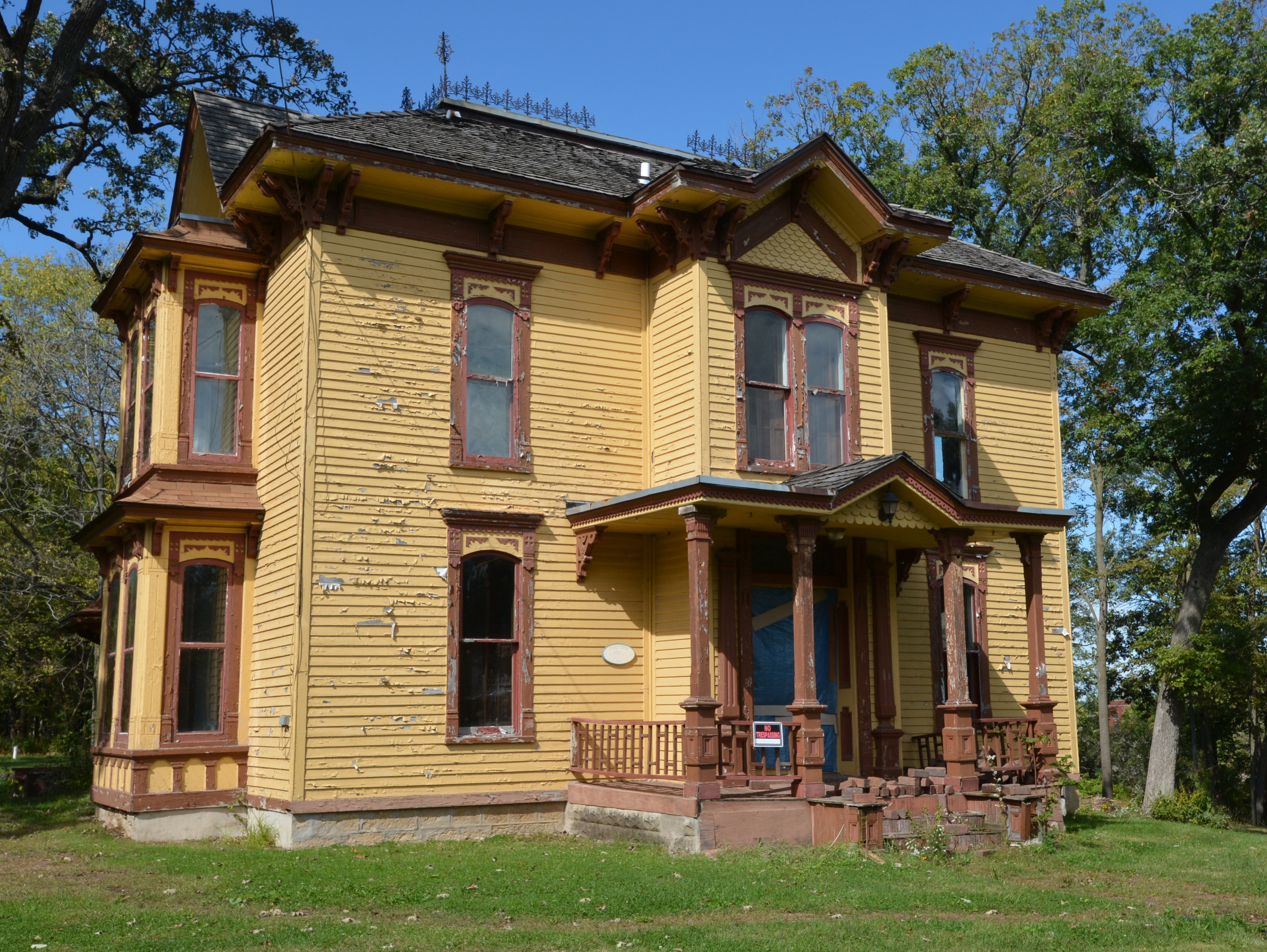
- George H. Hollister House in the Rockton Historic District

- Location of Rockton in Winnebago County, Illinois.
- Coordinates: 42°26′40″N 89°03′48″W
- Country: United States
- State: Illinois
- County: Winnebago
- Township: Rockton

Area
  - Total: 7.08 sq mi (18.33 km^{2})
  - Land: 6.86 sq mi (17.77 km^{2})
  - Water: 0.21 sq mi (0.55 km^{2})
- Elevation: 732 ft (223 m)

Population (2020)
  - Total: 7,863
  - Density: 1,145.9/sq mi (442.43/km^{2})
- Time zone: UTC-6 (CST)
  - Summer (DST): UTC-5 (CDT)
- ZIP code: 61072
- Area code: 815
- FIPS code: 17-65156
- GNIS feature ID: 2399106
- Website: rocktonil.gov

Rockton is a village in Winnebago County, Illinois. It is located in the Rock River Valley and is part of the Rockford metropolitan area. The population was 7,863 at the time of the 2020 census.

== History ==
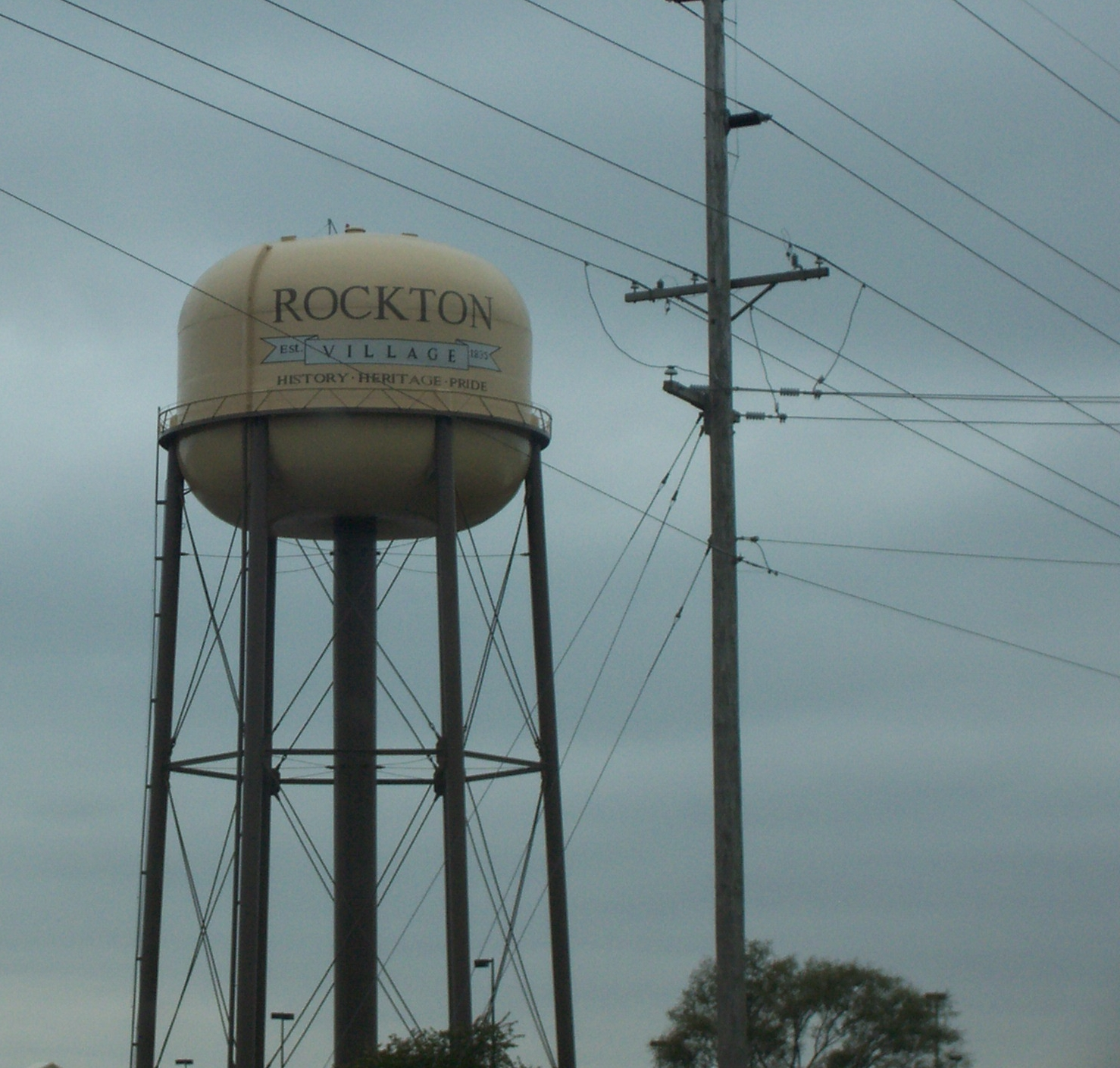
Water tower

Native American tribes originally inhabited the region. Stephen Mack, Jr. was the first white settler in the Rockton area. He was married to Hononegah, a respected Native American woman from one of the surrounding tribes. His original outpost (c. 1830s) eventually became Macktown. William Talcott arrived to the area later and, after a disagreement with Mack, settled on the other side of the nearby river within the present village of Rockton. Citizens who lived in Macktown would frequently travel across the river to Rockton but in 1851, the bridge from Macktown to Rockton washed away. The bridge had been built with funding from Stephen Mack and its destruction, along with Mack's death in 1850, led citizens to permanently move to Rockton. In northern Illinois, Macktown is the only community from the 1830s that is still standing without subsequent development.

On June 14, 2021, a large explosion and subsequent fire affected the Chemtool Lubrication production plant in Rockton. There were no serious injuries, but an area within a one-mile radius from the fire was evacuated. The massive smoke plume from the fire was reported to be visible up to 75 miles away from Rockton.

== Geography ==
According to the 2010 census, Rockton has a total area of 5.708 square miles (14.78 km^{2}), of which 5.5 square miles (14.24 km^{2}) (or 96.36%) is land and 0.208 square miles (0.54 km^{2}) (or 3.64%) is water.

== Demographics ==
Historical population
| Census | Pop. | Note | %± |
|---|---|---|---|
| 1880 | 949 | | — |
| 1890 | 892 | | −6.0% |
| 1900 | 936 | | 4.9% |
| 1910 | 841 | | −10.1% |
| 1920 | 899 | | 6.9% |
| 1930 | 1,077 | | 19.8% |
| 1940 | 1,156 | | 7.3% |
| 1950 | 1,432 | | 23.9% |
| 1960 | 1,833 | | 28.0% |
| 1970 | 2,099 | | 14.5% |
| 1980 | 2,313 | | 10.2% |
| 1990 | 2,928 | | 26.6% |
| 2000 | 5,296 | | 80.9% |
| 2010 | 7,685 | | 45.1% |
| 2020 | 7,863 | | 2.3% |
U.S. Decennial Census

=== 2020 census ===
As of the 2020 census, Rockton had a population of 7,863. The median age was 40.9 years. 25.5% of residents were under the age of 18 and 16.5% of residents were 65 years of age or older. For every 100 females there were 93.5 males, and for every 100 females age 18 and over there were 91.2 males age 18 and over.

97.4% of residents lived in urban areas, while 2.6% lived in rural areas.

There were 3,038 households in Rockton, of which 37.3% had children under the age of 18 living in them. Of all households, 58.4% were married-couple households, 12.3% were households with a male householder and no spouse or partner present, and 22.7% were households with a female householder and no spouse or partner present. About 22.5% of all households were made up of individuals and 11.4% had someone living alone who was 65 years of age or older.

There were 3,127 housing units, of which 2.8% were vacant. The homeowner vacancy rate was 0.9% and the rental vacancy rate was 2.6%.

Racial composition as of the 2020 census
| Race | Number | Percent |
|---|---|---|
| White | 6,999 | 89.0% |
| Black or African American | 100 | 1.3% |
| American Indian and Alaska Native | 23 | 0.3% |
| Asian | 122 | 1.6% |
| Native Hawaiian and Other Pacific Islander | 2 | 0.0% |
| Some other race | 105 | 1.3% |
| Two or more races | 512 | 6.5% |
| Hispanic or Latino (of any race) | 370 | 4.7% |

=== 2010 census ===
As of the census of 2010, there were 7,685 people, 1,930 households, and 1,464 families residing in the village. The population density was 1,505.5 inhabitants per square mile (581.3/km^{2}). There were 2,008 housing units at an average density of 570.8 per square mile (220.4/km^{2}). The racial makeup of the village was 91.80% White, 1.40% African American, 0.1% Native American, 1.10% Asian, 0.04% Pacific Islander, 0.45% from other races, and 0.45% from two or more races. Hispanic or Latino of any race were 3.60% of the population.

Of all households, 42.3% had children under the age of 18 living with them, 65.2% were married couples living together, 8.4% had a female householder with no husband present, and 24.1% were non-families. 20.6% of all households were made up of individuals, and 8.5% had someone living alone who was 65 years of age or older. The average household size was 2.72 and the average family size was 3.18.

In the village, the population was spread out, with 31.1% under the age of 18, 6.2% from 18 to 24, 31.4% from 25 to 44, 21.5% from 45 to 64, and 9.8% who were 65 years of age or older. The median age was 35 years. For every 100 females, there were 97.6 males. For every 100 females age 18 and over, there were 93.0 males.

=== Income and poverty ===
The median income for a household in the village was $57,292, and the median income for a family was $62,863. Males had a median income of $47,321 versus $32,771 for females. The per capita income for the village was $24,078. About 1.4% of families and 1.3% of the population were below the poverty line, including 1.3% of those under age 18 and none of those age 65 or over.

== Education ==
Most of Rockton is in the Rockton School District 140 while portions extend into the Kinnikinnick Community Consolidated School District 131. All of Rockton is in the Hononegah Community High School District 207.

== Notable people ==
- Jeremy Byrd, executive
- Scott Hall, jazz trumpeter and composer
- Julie Harshbarger, professional football kicker
- Slavka Kohout, Figure skating coach to Janet Lynn
