= Scott S. Hall =

American psychologist

Scott S. Hall is a psychology and behavioral science professor and researcher at Stanford University's School of Medicine, specializing in Fragile X syndrome, Prader-Willi syndrome, and in research on the relationship of Fragile X syndrome to other conditions, including autism spectrum disorders. He received a Doctor of Philosophy degree in psychology from the Institute of Psychiatry in 1997.
