= Stephen Mack Jr. =

American pioneer

Stephen Mack Jr. (February 2, 1798 – April 10, 1850) was an adventurer and pioneer. An employee of the American Fur Company employee, he founded Rockton, Illinois. Mack was the husband of Hononegah and the grandfather of Bio De Casseres.

== Biography ==
=== Background and early life 1798–1819 ===
Born in Tunbridge, Vermont, he was the son of Stephen and Temperance (Bond) Mack. Stephen, Jr. was a first cousin to Joseph Smith, the founder of the Latter Day Saint movement, and when the Latter-day Saints moved to Utah, Stephen's mother accompanied them. Stephen Mack, Sr. was engaged in the mercantile business at Tunbridge until 1807, when he went to Detroit, leaving his wife and family behind.

The senior Mack valued education, and knowing that there was little opportunity in such a remote frontier village, he had his family remain in Vermont. The younger Mack would later pursue a level of education uncommon for his time. When he had children of his own, he was very active in procuring the best educational opportunities for them. Stephen Mack, Sr., was the first English-speaking merchant in Detroit. He entered into a partnership, known as Mack & Conant, which remained in business until 1821, when it was acquired by its chief competitor, The American Fur Company. In 1812, he became a trustee of the village of Detroit, and later he was the founder of the city of Pontiac and a director of the Bank of Michigan.

Stephen, Jr. attended Moors Charity School, a preparatory school at Hanover, New Hampshire from August 30, 1813 to August 24, 1816, He then attended a college in Boston but was forced to drop out after a minor illness he failed to properly attend to which became a major one (he did not attend Dartmouth as has often been claimed). It is believed that he joined his father and other family members in Detroit in 1819.

=== Years at Grand Detour 1820–1829 ===
At that point, it is said that he joined a government expedition around the Great Lakes, the purpose of which has not been determined. Edson I. Carr's history of Rockton, published in 1898, relates a romance that Mack learned from traders at Green Bay about Illinois and possible opportunities there, so Mack traveled to the Rock River to the present site of Janesville and then traveled south into Illinois. At a Winnebago village at the present site of South Beloit, he learned of another village farther south located at the present site of Hononegah Forest Preserve, however legend says that Mack took the wrong path and ended up some forty miles to the southwest at a Winnebago village at the present site of Grand Detour in Ogle County. There he met a trader named Lasallier (perhaps his full name was Pierre St. Clair dit Lasallier), an old trading veteran who had operated trading posts on the Illinois and Rock Rivers since 1793. It is much more probable that the truth was that Mack had already known that Lasallier was there and had intended to work for him as a clerk, a usual practice for trading companies.

Mack was a clerk upon his arrival in 1820, and on October 20, 1823, he received his first license as a trader, followed by licenses on September 6, 1824, and October 5, 1826. Evidence suggests that Mack spent his winters at Grand Detour and then lived in Chicago during the summer. It is known that he voted occasionally and served as a clerk in elections there from 1828 to 1830. On September 29, 1830, he bought two lots in Chicago in the block bound by Randolph, Market, Washington, and Water Streets.

While residing at Grand Detour, Stephen Mack met his wife Hononegah. We do not know how or when they met. There is only a shadowy legend that Mack was sick with fever and that Hononegah nursed him back to health. During his stay at Grand Detour, Mack's relations with the villagers were not good. It is said that he became an advisor to the village chief and that the residents were jealous of Mack's supposed influence over him. They were also resentful of Mack because he had not married one of their women. According to Carr's history previously cited, Mack refused to sell liquor and firearms to them. There are several stories about Mack escaping death with Hononegah's help. One time, she warned him that the villagers were coming to kill him, and it took Mack an entire day to outrun them finally. On another occasion, Hononegah hid Mack in a barrel. The third story preserved by Edson Carr relates that Mack was returning to the village from Chicago when Hononegah met Mack in the woods to warn him not to return to the village. It is believed that Mack did not marry Hononegah out of love, but rather to express his gratitude to her for saving his life on numerous occasions. In February 1829, Mack purchased Lasallier's cabin, and it is likely that at this time, Mack formalized his relationship with Hononegah. It is believed that they had a child who died at birth sometime in 1829. Their eldest surviving child, Rosa, was born on November 14, 1830. Sometime in 1829, Stephen Mack, Jr., and Hononegah Mack fled Grand Detour for good.

=== Bird's Grove 1829–1835 ===
They went up the river into present-day Winnebago County and built a cabin in a Winnebago village at the present site of Hononegah Forest Preserve. Mack's sojourn there was peaceful until the outbreak of the Black Hawk War, when a party of Black Hawk's braves raided his cabin, searching for his supply of gunpowder (which Mack had succeeded in hiding). On May 9, 1832, Mack was run out of his cabin, and he and Hononegah fled to Chicago. Edson Carr relates a romance in which Mack met Black Hawk, and after the villagers advised Mack that they could not protect him, Mack took refuge on Webber's Island, and Hononegah provided him with food and fresh water daily until the threat was passed. Carr seems not to have believed the story, and modern research has also cast doubt on it.

On May 24, 1832, Mack enlisted in Captain John S.C. Hogan's company of militia with the rank of 1st Sergeant. Mack's company was too small to be an effective military organization. The only noteworthy event was when the company discovered the aftermath of the Indian Creek Massacre (which occurred May 20) at the Davis home, some twelve miles north of Ottawa, where fifteen whites were slain. By about the second week of June, army regulars from Michigan began arriving in Illinois to continue the war, and by mid-June, Mack's company of militia was dissolved.

By a treaty signed in Chicago by the Pottawatomies on September 28, 1833, Mack received $600.00 on behalf of his three daughters (supporting the belief that Hononegah was part Pottawatomie). After the war, Mack returned to his cabin to resume his trading operations.

=== Founding of Pecatonic 1835 ===
On July 25, 1835, William Talcott and his son Thomas visited Mack. At this time, Mack announced his intentions to found a new community on the south bluff overlooking the confluence of the Rock and Pecatonica Rivers, which he would name Pecatonic. Mack believed that the Rock River was navigable upstream for an additional 150 miles, while the Pecatonica was navigable for 100 miles; his site was ideal as a center for trade and commerce. The Talcotts returned to the East to get their families, and when they returned the following autumn, Mack had moved to the site of his new community, now located in the present day Macktown Forest Preserve.

The land that Mack was residing on was initially claimed by Joseph Thiebeau, who bought the rights for a section of land for his daughter under the terms of a treaty signed at Prairie du Chien on August 1, 1829. Subsequently, the daughter died young, making Joseph the legal heir and owner of the section, and on January 17, 1838, Thiebeau sold the land to Jean Baptiste Beaubien, a well-known trader active in Chicago for many years. By June 1838, Beaubien was a partner with Stephen Mack and, along with John P. Bradstreet, began selling lots in the new community.

On November 1, 1837, a treaty with the Winnebagos was signed in Washington. Mack presented a claim for $6,400.00 in merchandise. The commission prorated it, and Mack received $2,329.50. He also received an additional $5,000.00 on behalf of his five children (supporting the belief that Hononegah was part Winnebago).

With this money, Mack built himself a fine two-story frame house with a cellar, which later became the residence for the forest preserve caretaker and is now a museum. He also used the money to make other improvements. Sometime during 1842/43, Mack built the first bridge across the Rock River in Illinois, formerly located where the public boat landing is presently. The bridge replaced a ferry that he had begun running in 1837. Mack had offered Talcott a partnership in his settlement, but there was disagreement on the terms, and words were exchanged. There was a falling out between the two men, and the breach was never healed.

=== Talcott's Rockton 1835 ===
Talcott was interested in energy. He settled on the north side of the river within the present village of Rockton. He purchased most of the land and divided it into parcels. On June 2, 1838, he sold his first lot. Earlier, the Talcotts began digging a millrace, and in the Fall of 1839, their gristmill was fully operational. At the time, it was the only operation of its kind, and farmers traveled many miles to have their crops processed. A hotel was built for their lodging, and the settlement to the north of the river quickly expanded, supplanting Mack's Pecatonic settlement.

=== Life at Pecatonic 1835–1850 ===
In 1845, Mack tried to interest the Beloit College directors in building a seminary in his settlement. He was even willing to donate 20 acres (81,000 m^{2}) of his own land for the site. Probably Mack's motive was to provide a facility for the education of his own daughters.

However, the directors decided to establish the seminary in Rockford, and this decision became the basis for Rockford College. Despite this setback, Mack ensured that a classroom was set up on the second story of a house. He insisted that the settlement's girls be allowed to attend as well as the boys, and the classroom was even open to the Winnebago children. Despite the care he took to ensure that his own children were educated, it is recorded by Edson Carr that one of his daughters was too wild and often walked out of classes, and it is said that Mack eventually gave up on educating her.

Despite his bad relations with the Talcotts, Mack seemed to realize that the area's future was with Talcott's settlement. In 1846, by an act of the legislature, the town was officially named Rockton, a name suggested by one of the Talcotts. In 1849, Mack was appointed a Justice of the Peace and the first township treasurer of the school funds. On September 14, 1840, Mack was married to Hononegah by a Justice of the Peace. Since he was not legally married to her, he was concerned that his children might not inherit his estate, so he secured a legal marriage to that end.

At an unknown date, Mack had formed a business partnership with his cousin Merrill Elmaren Mack. He was incompetent, and when he died on March 25, 1844, he left Stephen Mack with substantial debt and a large amount of useless merchandise. Mack abandoned trading and merchandise altogether and bought a dairy farm west of Rockton, which was managed by the Stocker family (his second daughter, Mary, married Charles Stocker). As time passed and interest in his settlement dwindled, Mack purchased all the remaining available lots. At the time of his death, all the land that comprises the present Macktown Forest Preserve was owned by him.

Hononegah died of fever on September 8, 1847, leaving Mack with the responsibility of raising their eight surviving children. On February 4, 1848, Mack married Isabella Daniels of Harrison to provide a caregiver for his children.

=== Mack's death and burial odyssey ===
In 1850, Winnebago County was formally divided into townships. In an election held on April 2, 1850, Mack ran for the position of the first Township Supervisor of Rockton and was narrowly defeated by Sylvester Talcott. Six days later, on the following April 10, Mack died suddenly of unknown causes (rumors circulated for years that he was poisoned). Land for the Rockton Cemetery was donated to the village by one of the Talcotts, and Mack refused to have his own family members buried there. Mack, Hononegah, and one of their sons were buried in a cemetery near the present golf course clubhouse, marked by a boulder with a memorial plaque.

In 1880, the Mack estate was owned by Sylvester Smith. The cemetery was in such poor condition that Smith announced he intended to plow the site under, and if anyone had family buried there, they would have to move them soon. The Macks were transferred to Phillips Cemetery west of Rockton.

In May 1964, the executive committee for the forest preserve decided that Rockton's founder should be buried next to the Mack home and announced that they would relocate their remains to Macktown. There was a storm of protest by the descendants of the people who had moved the remains in 1880. The forest preserve waited until the dead of night on July 23, 1965, when they exhumed their remains and reburied them near Mack's home.

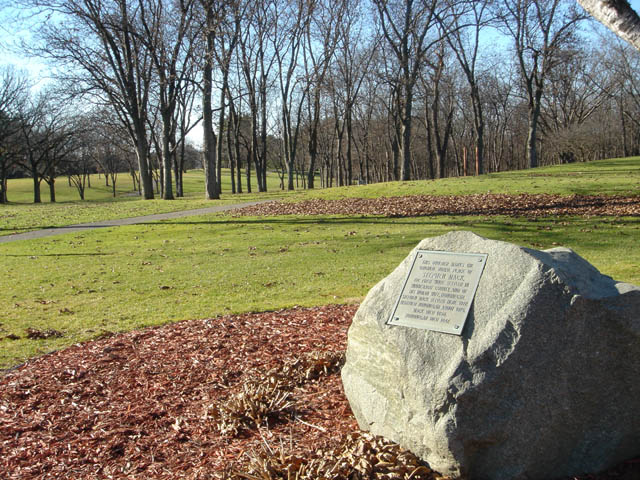
Grave of Stephen Mack Jr. Buried at Macktown forest preserve

== Sources ==
- Barge, William D., Early Lee County, Being Some Chapters in History of the Early Days in Lee County, Illinois, (1918).
- Bishop, David, Campbell, Craig, History of the Forest Preserves of Winnebago County, Illinois.
- Butterfield, C.W. (ed.) History of Rock County, Wisconsin, (1879).
- Carr, Edson I., The History of Rockton, 1820–1898, (1898, reprinted 1980).
- Clikeman-Miller, Diane J. The Old Settlers Remembered, A History of Phillips Cemetery, Macktown, Friends and Neighbors of Stephen Mack and Hononegah, (2000).
- The History of Winnebago County, Ill. (publ. H. F. Kett of Chicago, 1877).
- McAffee, Jim (ed.) Stephen Mack Letters, available at the Talcott Free Library.
- McMakin, Dean, The French Trappers and Traders, Friends of Stephen Mack and Residents of Pecatonic, available at the Talcott Free Library.
- McMakin, Dean, Hononegah, A New Biography, (2003), available at the Talcott Free Library.
- Olds, Marguerite, Biography of the Mack Families, 1798–1850, available at the Talcott Free Library.
- Rowland, Katherine E. The Pioneers of Winnebago and Boone Counties, Illinois Who Came Before 1841, (1990).
- Schmaeng, Janice E. Stephen Mack and the Early Settlement of Macktown and Rockton, (1974). available at the Talcott Free Library.
- Waggoner, Linda M., "Neither White Man Nor Indian", Affidavits from the Winnebago Mixed Blood Claim Commissions Prairie du Chien, Wisconsin, (2003).
- Way, Royal Brunson (ed.) The Rock River Valley, Vol. I.
