= List of Boone County, Illinois topics =

This is a list of topics related to Boone County, Illinois.

== Places ==
=== Communities ===
==== Cities ====
- Belvidere

==== Villages ====
- Caledonia
- Capron
- Cherry Valley (mostly in Winnebago County)
- Poplar Grove
- Timberlane

==== Census-designated places ====
- Argyle
- Blaine
- Candlewick Lake
- Garden Prairie
- Herbert
- Hunter
- Irene
- Russellville

==== Townships ====
Boone County is divided into these nine townships:

- Belvidere
- Bonus
- Boone
- Caledonia
- Flora
- Leroy
- Manchester
- Poplar Grove
- Spring

=== Education ===
- Harvard Community Unit School District 50
- Hiawatha Community Unit School District 426
- North Boone Community Unit School District 200
- Rockford School District 205
- Belvidere Community Unit School District 100
  - Belvidere North High School
  - Belvidere High School (Illinois)
- Rock Valley College

=== Churches ===
- Willow Creek Presbyterian Church, Argyle

=== Structures ===
- Illinois Route 76
- Illinois Route 173
- Interstate 90 in Illinois
- Kenosha and Rockford Railroad
- U.S. Route 20 Business (Rockford, Illinois)
- U.S. Route 20 in Illinois
- National Register of Historic Places listings in Boone County, Illinois
  - Lampert-Wildflower House
  - Old Belvidere High School (Belvidere, Illinois)
  - United States Post Office (Belvidere, Illinois)
  - Pettit Memorial Chapel
  - Belvidere North State Street Historic District
  - Belvidere South State Street Historic District
- Poplar Grove Airport
- Ida Public Library

=== Landforms ===
- Kishwaukee River
- Tributaries of the Kishwaukee River
  - Piscasaw Creek (Kishwaukee River)
  - Rush Creek (Kishwaukee River tributary)
  - Beaver Creek (Kishwaukee River tributary)
  - Killbuck Creek (Kishwaukee River tributary)
  - North Branch Kishwaukee River
  - South Branch Kishwaukee River
  - Mokeler Creek
  - Bessie Creek (Kishwaukee River tributary)
  - Lawrence Creek (Kishwaukee River tributary)
  - Owens Creek (Kishwaukee River tributary)
  - Coon Creek (Kishwaukee River tributary)
- Kishwaukee River State Fish and Wildlife Area
- White Rock Moraine

=== Historical periods ===
- Mississippian culture
- Upper Mississippian culture

== People ==
- Potowatomi
- Mascouten
- Mound Builders

- Daniel Boone
- John Wesley Powell

=== Argyle ===
- George Armour, early Argyle resident

=== Belvidere ===
- Othman A. Abbott, Nebraska politician who grew up in Belvidere and served in Illinois cavalry regiment
- Lucien Lester Ainsworth, Iowa politician who was a lawyer in Belvidere for a year
- Carrie Thomas Alexander-Bahrenberg
- Alfred Elisha Ames
- Philip Arbuckle
- List of George Franklin Barber works, architect, designed 15 historic houses in Belvidere
- Leo Binz, Catholic pastor in Belvidere, later Archbishop in MN
- Frank Bishop, infielder for the Chicago Browns
- Emory S. Bogardus, sociologist
- William D. Boies, Iowa politician born in Belvidere
- Elmer Ellsworth Brown, principal at Belvidere High School, later US Commissioner of Education
- Albert Cashier
- Joe Charboneau, outfielder and designated hitter for the Cleveland Indians
- Robert A. Childs, politician raised in Belvidere, part of Hurlbut's company 15th IL regiment, briefly lawyer there
- Reuben W. Coon, publisher of the Belvidere Northwestern and state's attorney for Boon County
- Thomas Neill Cream, Scots-born serial killer convicted of poisoning in Belvidere
- Myron Henry Feeley, Canadian politician, born in Belvidere
- John J. Foote
- Judith Ford, 1969 Miss America
- Allen C. Fuller
- Charles Eugene Fuller, U.S. Congressman
- DuFay A. Fuller
- Jack D. Franks, politician born in Belvidere
- Jeanne Gang, architect
- William Matthias Georgen, basketball player, captain of national champions Chicago Maroons 1908-1909
- Boyd Hill, Oklahoma territory coach
- Stephen Augustus Hurlbut (1815-1882), politician and Union commander in the Civil War
- Noyes L. Jackson, Illinois politician
- Kasey James, WWE wrestler
- Mike Junkin, NFL football player from Belvidere
- John Lawson (baseball)
- Amanda Levens, women's college basketball player and coach
- Edwin A. Miller, Wisconsin politician
- Richard S. Molony, Belvidere doctor who became a politician, buried in Belvidere cemetery
- Mary L. Moreland, Congregationalist minister
- Charles H. Parker, Beloit politician who lived in Belvidere
- Lowell Holden Parker, Wisconsin legislator, son of above
- Stan Patrick, basketball player, died in Belvidere
- Rowland Salley, musician born in Belvidere
- Albert Charles Schaeffer, mathematician
- Fred Schulte, outfielder for the St. Louis Browns, Washington Senators and Pittsburgh Pirates
- Kurt Sellers, wrestler with the WWE (as K.C. James and James Curtis)
- Cris Shale, football player, lives in Belvidere
- Rob Sherman, atheist activist, pilot who died in area plane crash
- James A. Slater, entomologist at the University of Connecticut
- Joe Sosnowski, current IL representative
- Ted Strain, Harvard Hornets and UW basketball player, died in Belvidere
- Roger Charles Sullivan, Illinois politician born in Belvidere
- Scott Taylor (racing driver)
- Horace Mann Towner, Iowa politician and Governor of Puerto Rico, born in Belvidere
- Cornelius Mortimer Treat, school administrator
- James Waddington, Wisconsin State Senator
- Ronald A. Wait, Illinois politician
- Frederick Wolf, Episcopal bishop, priest of Holy Trinity Church in Belvidere

=== Caledonia ===
- Glenn W. Birkett
- John Early (Illinois politician)
- Murder of Peggy Johnson, Jane Doe murder victim originally buried in Caledonia, now in Belvidere

=== Capron ===
- Zeke Markshausen NFL player
- Horace Capron, village named for him

=== Cherry Valley ===
- Virgil Abloh
- John Baumgarten
- Leroy M. Green
- Mo Pitney

=== Garden Prairie ===
- A. A. Ames, Minnesota politician, born in Garden Prairie
- Washington Porter, farmer and real estate entrepreneur, born and raised in Garden Prairie

=== Loves Park ===
- Dick Kulpa
- Robin Zander

=== Russellville ===
- Laura Andrews Rhodes, opera singer raised in Russellville

== Organizations ==
- 15th Illinois Infantry Regiment
- 95th Illinois Infantry Regiment
- Belvidere Standard daily newspaper (available on newspapers.com)
- Belvidere Daily Republican daily newspaper (available on newspapers.com)
- Belvidere Assembly Plant
- Boone County Historical Society
- Boone County Museum of History
- Poplar Grove Wings and Wheels Museum
- Chrysler Motors
- Dean Foods
- General Mills
- Rockford Park District
- National Sewing Machine Company
- Angelic Organics
- The Real Dirt on Farmer John
- Illinois's 16th congressional district

• State House District 69 • State Senate District 35

- WIFR-LD
- WXRX
- Elgin and Belvidere Electric Company
- Galena and Chicago Union Railroad
- Stroh's Ice Cream
- Eldredge (automobile)
- Metalith
- Prairie Cat Mastering
- Hilander Foods

== Events ==
- 1967 Oak Lawn tornado outbreak
- 2007 Midwest flooding
- January 2008 tornado outbreak sequence
- 2015 Rochelle–Fairdale, Illinois tornado
- August 2020 Midwest derecho
- Tornado outbreak sequence of May 15–20, 2017
- Nihon Dempa Kogyo, Japanese company, quartz crystal manufacturer; 2009 Belvidere plant explosion

== Other ==
- Christmas club
