= Rockford metropolitan area, Illinois =

Rockford metropolitan area
- Combined statistical area
- Rockford–Freeport–Rochelle, IL
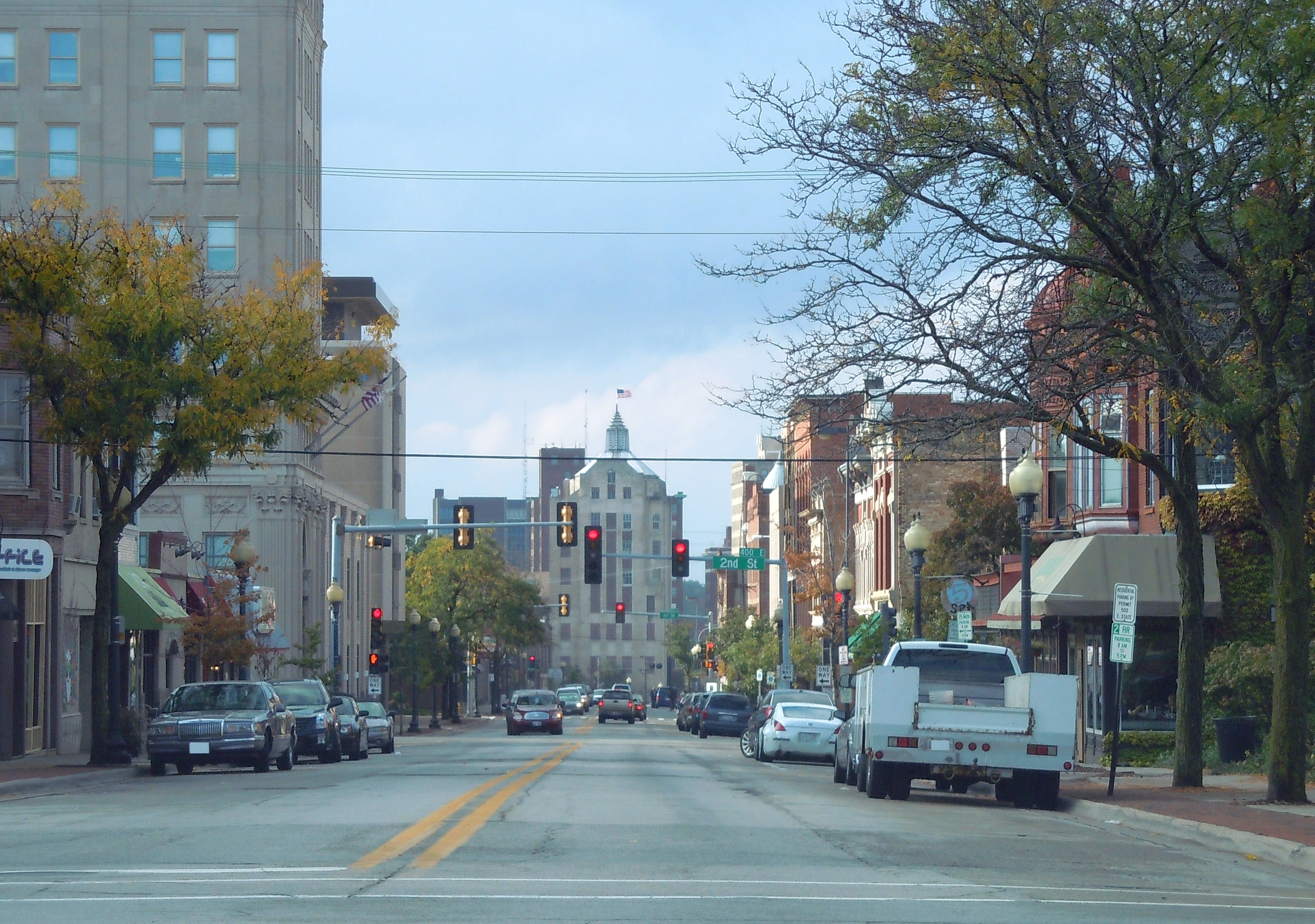
- East State Street corridor
Map of Rockford–Freeport–Rochelle, IL CSA
City of Rockford
Rockford, IL MSA
Freeport, IL µSA
Rochelle, IL µSA
- Country: United States
- State: Illinois

Area
  - Total: 2,130 sq mi (5,510 km^{2})

Population (2020)
  - Total: 338,798

GDP
  - Total: $18.129 billion (2022)
- Time zone: UTC−6 (CST)
  - Summer (DST): UTC−5 (CDT)

The Rockford metropolitan area is a metropolitan area consisting of two counties in north-central Illinois anchored by the city of Rockford, as defined by the U.S. Office of Management and Budget. The population was 338,798 at the 2020 census. The Rockford MSA abuts the Janesville–Beloit metropolitan area to the north and Chicago metropolitan area to the east. It forms the main part of the larger Rockford–Freeport–Rochelle combined statistical area, a four-county region with 435,216 residents in 2020.

== Counties ==
- Boone
- Ogle (combined statistical area)
- Stephenson (combined statistical area)
- Winnebago

== Communities ==
- Places with more than 100,000 inhabitants
  - Rockford (Principal City)
- Places with 20,000 to 30,000 inhabitants
  - Belvidere
  - Freeport
  - Loves Park
  - Machesney Park
- Places with 5,000 to 20,000 inhabitants
  - Candlewick Lake (census designated place)
  - Rochelle
  - Rockton
  - Roscoe
  - South Beloit
  - Poplar Grove
- Places with 1,000 to 5,000 inhabitants
  - Byron
  - Cherry Valley
  - Davis Junction
  - Durand
  - Forreston
  - Hillcrest
  - Lake Summerset (census-designated place; partial)
  - Lena
  - Mount Morris
  - Oregon
  - Pecatonica
  - Polo
  - Capron
  - Stillman Valley
  - Westlake Village (census designated place)
  - Willow Lake (census designated place)
  - Winnebago
- Places with less than 1,000 inhabitants
  - Adeline
  - Baileyville (census designated place)
  - Caledonia
  - Cedarville
  - Creston
  - Dakota
  - Davis
  - Garden Prairie (census designated place)
  - German Valley
  - Grand Detour (census designated place)
  - Holcomb (census designated place)
  - Kings (census designated place)
  - Leaf River
  - Lost Nation (census designated place)
  - Monroe Center
  - New Milford
  - Orangeville
  - Pearl City
  - Ridott
  - Rock City
  - Timberlane
  - Winslow
- Unincorporated places
  - Afolkey
  - Alworth
  - Argyle
  - Blaine
  - Bolton
  - Brookville
  - Buckhorn Corners
  - Buena Vista
  - Chana
  - Damascus
  - Daysville
  - Egan
  - Eleroy
  - Evarts
  - Flagg
  - Florence
  - Haldane
  - Harlem
  - Harper
  - Harrison
  - Hazelhurst
  - Herbert
  - Hunter
  - Irene
  - Kent
  - Kishwaukee
  - Latham Park
  - Lindenwood
  - Loran
  - McConnell
  - Oneco
  - Paynes Point
  - Red Oak
  - Rock Grove
  - Russellville
  - Scioto Mills
  - Seward
  - Shirland
  - Stratford
  - Waddams Grove
  - Wempletown
  - Westfield Corners
  - White Rock
  - Winneshiek
  - Woosung
  - Yellow Creek

== Townships ==
- Belvidere
- Bonus
- Boone
- Burritt
- Caledonia
- Cherry Valley
- Durand
- Flora
- Harlem
- Harrison
- Laona
- Leroy

- Manchester
- Owen
- Pecatonica
- Poplar Grove
- Rockford
- Rockton
- Roscoe
- Seward
- Shirland
- Spring
- Winnebago

== Demographics ==
Historical population
Census	Pop.	Note	%±
1900	47,845		—
1910	63,153		32.0%
1920	90,929		44.0%
1930	117,373		29.1%
1940	121,178		3.2%
1950	152,385		25.8%
1960	230,091		51.0%
1970	272,063		18.2%
1980	279,514		2.7%
1990	283,719		1.5%
2000	320,204		12.9%
2010	349,431		9.1%
2020	338,798		−3.0%
U.S. Decennial Census

As of the census of 2000, there were 320,204 people, 122,577 households, and 84,896 families residing within the MSA. The racial makeup of the MSA was 83.46% White, 9.27% African American, 0.29% Native American, 1.56% Asian, 0.03% Pacific Islander, 3.57% from other races, and 1.82% from two or more races. Hispanic or Latino of any race were 7.63% of the population.

The median income for a household in the MSA was $48,142, and the median income for a family was $55,881. Males had a median income of $41,141 versus $25,819 for females. The per capita income for the MSA was $21,392.

County	Seat	2025 estimate	2020 Census	Change	Area	Density
Winnebago	Rockford	283,674	285,350	−0.59%	519 sq mi (1,340 km^{2})	547/sq mi (211/km^{2})
Boone	Belvidere	53,568	53,448	+0.22%	282 sq mi (730 km^{2})	190/sq mi (73/km^{2})
Total		337,242	338,798	−0.46%	801 sq mi (2,070 km^{2})	421/sq mi (163/km^{2})

== Combined statistical area ==
The Rockford–Freeport–Rochelle combined statistical area is made up of four counties in north-central Illinois. The statistical area includes one metropolitan area and two micropolitan areas. It had a population of 435,216 at the 2020 census.

- Metropolitan statistical areas (MSAs)
  - Rockford (Winnebago and Boone counties)
- Micropolitan statistical areas (μSAs)
  - Freeport (Stephenson County)
  - Rochelle (Ogle County)

Statistical Area	2025 estimate	2020 Census	Change	Area	Density
Rockford, IL Metropolitan Statistical Area	337,242	338,798	−0.46%	801 sq mi (2,070 km^{2})	421/sq mi (163/km^{2})
Rochelle, IL Micropolitan Statistical Area	51,399	51,788	−0.75%	763 sq mi (1,980 km^{2})	67/sq mi (26/km^{2})
Freeport, IL Micropolitan Statistical Area	43,220	44,630	−3.16%	565 sq mi (1,460 km^{2})	76/sq mi (30/km^{2})
Total	431,861	435,216	−0.77%	2,129 sq mi (5,510 km^{2})	203/sq mi (78/km^{2})

== See also ==
- Illinois statistical areas
