= Illinois's 16th congressional district =

U.S. House district for Illinois

- Interactive map of district boundaries since January 3, 2023
- Representative: Darin LaHood; R–Peoria
- Area: 9,030.5 mi^{2} (23,389 km^{2})
- Distribution: 71% urban; 29% rural
- Population (2025): 747,882
- Median household income: $90,328
- Ethnicity: 84.8% White; 6.6% Hispanic; 3.7% Two or more races; 2.3% Asian; 2.2% Black; 0.4% other
- Cook PVI: R+11

The 16th congressional district of Illinois is represented by Republican Darin LaHood. Prominent past representatives from the 16th district have included Everett Dirksen, who went on to become the Republican leader in the United States Senate; John B. Anderson, who became the 3rd highest ranking Republican in the House and went on to run as a major independent candidate in the 1980 United States presidential election; and Lynn Martin, who later served as United States Secretary of Labor.

For more than six decades, the shape of the 16th district fluctuated far less than that of any other Illinois congressional district. At this time, it generally included the northwest corner of the state, extending just far enough to the east to grab its largest city, Rockford. By the 1990s, it also extended eastward to include part of McHenry County, an outer suburb of Chicago. This geographic stability also contributed to electoral stability. It first became a Rockford-based district for the 1948 election, and from then until 2012, it was represented by just five people, all but one of whom was a Republican. The sole Democrat to have held it in that period, John W. Cox, Jr., only did so for one term.

== History ==
=== 2011 redistricting ===
The congressional district covers parts of DeKalb, Ford, Stark, Will and Winnebago counties, and all of Boone, Bureau, Grundy, Iroquois, LaSalle, Lee, Livingston, Ogle and Putnam counties, as of the 2011 redistricting which followed the 2010 census. All or parts of Belvidere, Channahon, DeKalb, Dixon, Loves Park, Machesney Park, Ottawa, Morris, Pontiac, Rockford and Streator are included. The representatives for these districts were elected in the 2012 primary and general elections, and the boundaries became effective on January 5, 2013.

After the 2010 census, the 16th was significantly redrawn for the first time in decades. It was pushed to the east to include the southwestern exurbs of the Chicago metropolitan area, stretching from the Wisconsin border to the Indiana border. While it still included most of Rockford's suburbs, half of Rockford itself (mainly the Democratic-leaning western portion of the city) was shifted to the 17th district. The district was significantly redrawn again after the 2020 census, essentially merging the more Republican portions of the old 16th and 18th districts.

== Composition ==
For the 118th and successive Congresses (based on redistricting following the 2020 census), the district contains all or portions of the following counties, townships, and municipalities:

Boone County (12)

Belvidere (part, also 11th), Belvidere Township (part, also 11th), Boone Township, Caledonia, Caledonia Township, Capron, Flora Township (part, also 11th), Leroy Township, Manchester Township, Poplar Grove (part, also 11th), Poplar Grove Township, Timberlane

Bureau County (32)

Annawan (part, shared with Henry County), Arispie Township, Buda, Bureau Township, Clarion Township, Concord Township, Dover, Dover Township, Fairfield Township, Gold Township, Greenville Township, Indiantown Township, La Moille, La Moille Township, Leepertown Township (part, also 14th), Macon Township, Manlius, Manlius Township, Mineral, Mineral Township, Neponset, Neponset Township, New Bedford, Ohio, Ohio Township, Princeton, Princeton Township, Sheffield, Tiskilwa, Walnut, Walnut Township, Wyanet, Wyanet Township

DeKalb County (4)

Franklin Township, Kirkland, Mayfield Township, South Grove Township

Ford County (2)

Drummer Township (part, also 2nd), Gibson City

Grundy County (34)

All 34 townships and municipalities

Henry County (31)

Alba Township, Alpha, Annawan (part, shared with Bureau County), Annawan Township, Andover, Andover Township, Atkinson, Atkinston Township, Bishop Hill, Burns Township, Cambridge, Cambridge Township, Cleveland, Clover Township, Colona Township (part, also 17th), Cornwall Township, Edford Township, Geneseo, Geneseo Township, Hooppole, Loraine Township, Lynn Township, Munson Township, Osco Township, Orion, Oxford Township, Phenix Township, Weller Township, Western Township, Woodhull, Yorktown Township

Jo Daviess County (33)

All 33 townships and municipalities

LaSalle County (22)

Allen Township, Brookfield Township, Bruce Township, Deer Park Township (part, also 14th), Eagle Township, Eden Township (part, also 14th), Fall River Township, Farm Ridge Township (part, also 14th), Grand Rapids Township, Grand Ridge, Hope Township, Kangley, Leonore, Lostant, Marseilles, Otter Creek Township, Ransom, Richland Township, Seneca (part, also 14th; shared with Grundy County), Streator (part, shared with Livingston County), Tonica (part, also 14th), Vermillion Township

Lee County (34)

All 34 townships and municipalities

Livingston County (17)

Amity Township, Cornell, Eppards Point Township, Esmen Township, Flanagan, Long Point, Long Point Township, Nebraska Township, Newtown Township, Pike Township, Pontiac (part, also 2nd), Pontiac Township (part, also 2nd), Reading Township, Rooks Creek Township, Streator (part, shared with LaSalle County), Sunbury Township, Waldo Township

Marshall County (21)

All 21 townships and municipalities

McHenry County (6)

Alden, Alden Township, Chemung Township, Dunham Township, Hartland Township (part, also 11th), Harvard

McLean County (48)

Allin Township, Anchor, Anchor Township, Arrowsmith, Arrowsmith Township, Bellflower, Bellflower Township, Bloomington (part, also 17th), Bloomington Township, Blue Mound Township, Carlock, Cheney's Grove Township, Chenoa, Chenoa Township, Colfax, Cooksville, Cropsey Township, Dale Township (part, also 17th; includes part of Twin Grove), Danvers, Danvers Township, Dawson Township, Downs, Downs Township, Dry Grove Township (part, also 17th; includes part of Twin Grove), Ellsworth, Empire Township, Gridley, Gridley Township, Heyworth, Hudson, Hudson Township, Lawndale Township, Le Roy, Lexington, Lexington Township, Martin Township, Money Creek Township, Normal (part, also 17th), Normal Township (part, also 17th), Old Town Township, Randolph Township, Saybrook, Stanford, Towanda, Towanda Township, West Township, White Oak Township, Yates Township

Ogle County (37)

All 37 townships and municipalities

Peoria County (19)

Akron Township, Bellevue (part, also 17th), Brimfield, Brimfield Township, Chillicothe, Chillicothe Township, Dunlap, Hallock Township, Jubilee Township, Kickapoo Township, Limestone Township (part, also 17th), Medina Township, Millbrook Township, Norwood, Peoria (part, also 17th), Princeville, Princeville Township, Radnor Township, West Peoria (part, also 17th)

Putnam County (5)

Hennepin Township (part, also 14th), Magnolia, Magnolia Township, McNabb, Senachwine Township

Stark County (12)

All 12 townships and municipalities

Stephenson County (15)

Buckeye Township, Cedarville (part, also 17th), Dakota, Dakota Township, Davis, Lena, Oneco Township, Orangeville, Rock City, Rock Grove Township, Rock Run Township, Waddams Township, West Point Township, Winslow, Winslow Township

Tazewell County (24)

Cincinnati Township (part, also 17th), Creve Coeur, Deer Creek (part, shared with Woodford County), Deer Creek Township, East Peoria, Elm Grove Township, Fondulac Township, Groveland Township, Hopedale, Hopedale Township (part, also 17th), Little Mackinaw Township (part, also 17th), Mackinaw, Mackinaw Township, Marquette Heights, Minier, Morton, Morton Township, North Pekin, Pekin (part, also 17th), Pekin Township (part, also 17th), Tremont, Tremont Township, Washington, Washington Township

Winnebago County (22)

Burritt Township, Cherry Valley, Cherry Valley Township (part, also 17th), Durand, Durand Township, Harlem Township, Harrison Township, Laona Township, Loves Park (part, also 17th), Machesney Park, New Milford, Owen Township, Pecatonica, Pecatonica Township, Rockford (part, also 17th), Rockford Township (part, also 17th), Rockton, Rockton Township, Roscoe, Roscoe Township, Shirland Township, Winnebago Township (part, also 17th)

Woodford County (17)

All 17 townships and municipalities

== Recent election results from statewide races ==
Year	Office	Results
2008	President	McCain 52% - 46%
2012	President	Romney 59% - 41%
2016	President	Trump 58% - 34%
2016	Senate	Kirk 59% - 34%
2016	Comptroller (Spec.)	Munger 63% - 31%
2018	Governor	Rauner 55% - 35%
2018	Attorney General	Harold 63% - 35%
2018	Secretary of State	White 51% - 46%
2018	Comptroller	Senger 56% - 40%
2018	Treasurer	Dodge 58% - 39%
2020	President	Trump 60% - 38%
2020	Senate	Curran 58% - 38%
2022	Senate	Salvi 60% - 39%
2022	Governor	Bailey 61% - 36%
2022	Attorney General	DeVore 63% - 34%
2022	Secretary of State	Brady 65% - 32%
2022	Comptroller	Teresi 60% - 38%
2022	Treasurer	Demmer 62% - 35%
2024	President	Trump 60% - 38%

== List of members representing the district ==
Member	Party	Years	Cong ress	Electoral history	District location
District created March 4, 1873
James S. Martin (Salem)	Republican	March 4, 1873 – March 3, 1875	43rd	Elected in 1872. Lost re-election.	1873–1883 [data missing]
William A. J. Sparks (Carlyle)	Democratic	March 4, 1875 – March 3, 1883	44th 45th 46th 47th	Elected in 1874. Re-elected in 1876. Re-elected in 1878. Re-elected in 1880. Retired.	1873–1883 [data missing]
Aaron Shaw (Olney)	Democratic	March 4, 1883 – March 3, 1885	48th	Elected in 1882. Retired.	1883–1893 [data missing]
Silas Z. Landes (Mount Carmel)	Democratic	March 4, 1885 – March 3, 1889	49th 50th	Elected in 1884. Re-elected in 1886. Retired.	1883–1893 [data missing]
George W. Fithian (Newton)	Democratic	March 4, 1889 – March 3, 1895	51st 52nd 53rd	Elected in 1888. Re-elected in 1890. Re-elected in 1892. Redistricted to the 19th district and lost re-election there.	1883–1893 [data missing]
George W. Fithian (Newton)	Democratic	March 4, 1889 – March 3, 1895	51st 52nd 53rd	Elected in 1888. Re-elected in 1890. Re-elected in 1892. Redistricted to the 19th district and lost re-election there.	1893–1895 [data missing]
Finis E. Downing (Virginia)	Democratic	March 4, 1895 – June 5, 1896	54th	Elected in 1894. Lost contested election.	1895–1903 [data missing]
John I. Rinaker (Carlinville)	Republican	June 5, 1896 – March 3, 1897	54th	Won contested election. Lost re-election.	1895–1903 [data missing]
William H. Hinrichsen (Jacksonville)	Democratic	March 4, 1897 – March 3, 1899	55th	Elected in 1896. Retired.	1895–1903 [data missing]
William E. Williams (Pittsfield)	Democratic	March 4, 1899 – March 3, 1901	56th	Elected in 1898. Retired.	1895–1903 [data missing]
Thomas J. Selby (Hardin)	Democratic	March 4, 1901 – March 3, 1903	57th	Elected in 1900. Retired.	1895–1903 [data missing]
Joseph V. Graff (Peoria)	Republican	March 4, 1903 – March 3, 1911	58th 59th 60th 61st	Redistricted from the 14th district and re-elected in 1902. Re-elected in 1904. Re-elected in 1906. Re-elected in 1908. Lost re-election.	1903–1913 [data missing]
Claude U. Stone (Peoria)	Democratic	March 4, 1911 – March 3, 1917	62nd 63rd 64th	Elected in 1910. Re-elected in 1912. Re-elected in 1914. Lost re-election.	1903–1913 [data missing]
Claude U. Stone (Peoria)	Democratic	March 4, 1911 – March 3, 1917	62nd 63rd 64th	Elected in 1910. Re-elected in 1912. Re-elected in 1914. Lost re-election.	1913–1923 [data missing]
Clifford C. Ireland (Peoria)	Republican	March 4, 1917 – March 3, 1923	65th 66th 67th	Elected in 1916. Re-elected in 1918. Re-elected in 1920. Lost renomination.	1913–1923 [data missing]
William E. Hull (Peoria)	Republican	March 4, 1923 – March 3, 1933	68th 69th 70th 71st 72nd	Elected in 1922. Re-elected in 1924. Re-elected in 1926. Re-elected in 1928. Re-elected in 1930. Lost renomination.	1923–1933 [data missing]
Everett Dirksen (Pekin)	Republican	March 4, 1933 – January 3, 1949	73rd 74th 75th 76th 77th 78th 79th 80th	Elected in 1932. Re-elected in 1934. Re-elected in 1936. Re-elected in 1938. Re-elected in 1940. Re-elected in 1942. Re-elected in 1944. Re-elected in 1946. Retired.	1933–1943 [data missing]
Everett Dirksen (Pekin)	Republican	March 4, 1933 – January 3, 1949	73rd 74th 75th 76th 77th 78th 79th 80th	Elected in 1932. Re-elected in 1934. Re-elected in 1936. Re-elected in 1938. Re-elected in 1940. Re-elected in 1942. Re-elected in 1944. Re-elected in 1946. Retired.	1943–1949 [data missing]
Leo E. Allen (Galena)	Republican	January 3, 1949 – January 3, 1961	81st 82nd 83rd 84th 85th 86th	Redistricted from the 13th district and re-elected in 1948. Re-elected in 1950. Re-elected in 1952. Re-elected in 1954. Re-elected in 1956. Re-elected in 1958. Retired.	1949–1953 [data missing]
Leo E. Allen (Galena)	Republican	January 3, 1949 – January 3, 1961	81st 82nd 83rd 84th 85th 86th	Redistricted from the 13th district and re-elected in 1948. Re-elected in 1950. Re-elected in 1952. Re-elected in 1954. Re-elected in 1956. Re-elected in 1958. Retired.	1953–1963 [data missing]
John B. Anderson (Rockford)	Republican	January 3, 1961 – January 3, 1981	87th 88th 89th 90th 91st 92nd 93rd 94th 95th 96th	Elected in 1960. Re-elected in 1962. Re-elected in 1964. Re-elected in 1966. Re-elected in 1968. Re-elected in 1970. Re-elected in 1972. Re-elected in 1976. Re-elected in 1978. Retired to run for U.S. President.	1953–1963 [data missing]
John B. Anderson (Rockford)	Republican	January 3, 1961 – January 3, 1981	87th 88th 89th 90th 91st 92nd 93rd 94th 95th 96th	Elected in 1960. Re-elected in 1962. Re-elected in 1964. Re-elected in 1966. Re-elected in 1968. Re-elected in 1970. Re-elected in 1972. Re-elected in 1976. Re-elected in 1978. Retired to run for U.S. President.	1963–1967 [data missing]
John B. Anderson (Rockford)	Republican	January 3, 1961 – January 3, 1981	87th 88th 89th 90th 91st 92nd 93rd 94th 95th 96th	Elected in 1960. Re-elected in 1962. Re-elected in 1964. Re-elected in 1966. Re-elected in 1968. Re-elected in 1970. Re-elected in 1972. Re-elected in 1976. Re-elected in 1978. Retired to run for U.S. President.	1967–1973 [data missing]
John B. Anderson (Rockford)	Republican	January 3, 1961 – January 3, 1981	87th 88th 89th 90th 91st 92nd 93rd 94th 95th 96th	Elected in 1960. Re-elected in 1962. Re-elected in 1964. Re-elected in 1966. Re-elected in 1968. Re-elected in 1970. Re-elected in 1972. Re-elected in 1976. Re-elected in 1978. Retired to run for U.S. President.	1973–1983 [data missing]
Lynn Morley Martin (Loves Park)	Republican	January 3, 1981 – January 3, 1991	97th 98th 99th 100th 101st	Elected in 1980. Re-elected in 1982. Re-elected in 1984. Re-elected in 1986. Re-elected in 1988. Retired to run for U.S. Senator.	1973–1983 [data missing]
Lynn Morley Martin (Loves Park)	Republican	January 3, 1981 – January 3, 1991	97th 98th 99th 100th 101st	Elected in 1980. Re-elected in 1982. Re-elected in 1984. Re-elected in 1986. Re-elected in 1988. Retired to run for U.S. Senator.	1983–1993 [data missing]
John W. Cox Jr. (Galena)	Democratic	January 3, 1991 – January 3, 1993	102nd	Elected in 1990. Lost re-election.	1983–1993 [data missing]
Don Manzullo (Egan)	Republican	January 3, 1993 – January 3, 2013	103rd 104th 105th 106th 107th 108th 109th 110th 111th 112th	Elected in 1992. Re-elected in 1994. Re-elected in 1996. Re-elected in 1998. Re-elected in 2000; Re-elected in 2002; Re-elected in 2004; Re-elected in 2006; Re-elected in 2008; Re-elected in 2010; Lost renomination.	1993–2003 [data missing]
Don Manzullo (Egan)	Republican	January 3, 1993 – January 3, 2013	103rd 104th 105th 106th 107th 108th 109th 110th 111th 112th	Elected in 1992. Re-elected in 1994. Re-elected in 1996. Re-elected in 1998. Re-elected in 2000; Re-elected in 2002; Re-elected in 2004; Re-elected in 2006; Re-elected in 2008; Re-elected in 2010; Lost renomination.	2003–2013
Adam Kinzinger (Channahon)	Republican	January 3, 2013 – January 3, 2023	113th 114th 115th 116th 117th	Redistricted from the 11th district and re-elected in 2012. Re-elected in 2014. Re-elected in 2016. Re-elected in 2018. Re-elected in 2020. Retired.	2013–2023
Darin LaHood (Peoria)	Republican	January 3, 2023 – present	118th 119th	Redistricted from the 18th district and re-elected in 2022. Re-elected in 2024. Re-elected in 2026.	2023–present

== Recent election results ==
=== 2012 ===
Illinois's 16th congressional district, 2012
Party	Candidate	Votes	%
Republican	Adam Kinzinger (incumbent)	181,789	61.8
Democratic	Wanda Rohl	112,301	38.2
Total votes		294,090	100.0
Republican hold			

=== 2014 ===
Illinois's 16th congressional district, 2014
Party	Candidate	Votes	%
Republican	Adam Kinzinger (incumbent)	153,388	70.6
Democratic	Randall Olsen	63,810	29.4
Total votes		217,198	100.0
Republican hold			

=== 2016 ===
Illinois's 16th congressional district, 2016
Party	Candidate	Votes	%
Republican	Adam Kinzinger (incumbent)	259,722	99.9
Independent	John Burchardt (write-in)	131	0.1
Total votes		259,853	100.0
Republican hold			

=== 2018 ===
Illinois's 16th congressional district, 2018
Party	Candidate	Votes	%
Republican	Adam Kinzinger (incumbent)	151,254	59.1
Democratic	Sara Dady	104,569	40.9
Independent	John M. Stassi (write-in)	2	0.0
Total votes		255,825	100.0
Republican hold			

=== 2020 ===
Illinois's 16th congressional district, 2020
Party	Candidate	Votes	%
Republican	Adam Kinzinger (incumbent)	218,839	64.7
Democratic	Dani Brzozowski	119,313	35.2
Write-in		7	0.0
Total votes		338,159	100.0
Republican hold			

=== 2022 ===
Illinois's 16th congressional district, 2022
Party	Candidate	Votes	%
Republican	Darin LaHood (incumbent)	197,621	66.3
Democratic	Elizabeth Haderlein	100,325	33.6
Total votes		297,946	100.0
Republican hold			

=== 2024 ===
Illinois's 16th congressional district, 2024
Party	Candidate	Votes	%
Republican	Darin LaHood (incumbent)	310,925	99.94
Write-in		183	0.06
Total votes		311,108	100.0
Republican hold			

== See also ==
- Illinois's congressional districts
- List of United States congressional districts
