= Beaver Creek (Kishwaukee River tributary) =

Tributary of the Kishwaukee River in Illinois, USA

Location
- Country: United States
- State: Illinois
- County: Boone County

Physical characteristics
- Source
  - location: Near Blaine, Boone County, Illinois
  - coordinates: 42°27′04″N 88°48′24″W
- Mouth: Kishwaukee River
  - location: Belvidere, Boone County, Illinois
  - coordinates: 42°15′20″N 88°55′27″W
  - elevation: 728 ft (222 m)
- Length: 27.8 mi (44.7 km)

Beaver Creek is a 27.8-mile-long (44.7 km) tributary of the Kishwaukee River in northern Illinois.

== Course ==
Beaver Creek flows through central Boone County, Illinois, where the Beaver Creek network generally flows northeast to southwest. Poplar Grove and Capron are the two major settlements in the Beaver Creek watershed; Candlewick Lake, an unincorporated community, is also found in the watershed.

== Description ==
Beaver Creek drains 70 square miles (180 km^{2}) and has at least one tributary - known as Mosquito Creek (renamed Meander Creek).
