= Caledonia Township, Illinois =

Caledonia Township
- Township
- Location in Boone County

- Boone County's location in Illinois
- Coordinates: 42°22′15″N 88°54′06″W
- Country: United States
- State: Illinois
- County: Boone
- Settlement: November 6, 1849

Area
  - Total: 24.35 sq mi (63.1 km^{2})
  - Land: 24.04 sq mi (62.3 km^{2})
  - Water: 0.31 sq mi (0.80 km^{2}) 1.27%
- Elevation: 912 ft (278 m)

Population (2020)
  - Total: 7,294
  - Density: 303.4/sq mi (117.1/km^{2})
- Time zone: UTC-6 (CST)
  - Summer (DST): UTC-5 (CDT)
- ZIP codes: 61008, 61011, 61065
- FIPS code: 17-007-10435

Caledonia Township is one of nine townships in Boone County, Illinois, United States. As of the 2020 census, its population was 7,294 and it contained 2,590 housing units. Sometime after 1921, Poplar Grove Township was formed from a portion of Caledonia Township.

== Geography ==
According to the 2010 census, the township has a total area of 24.35 square miles (63.1 km^{2}), of which 24.04 square miles (62.3 km^{2}) (or 98.73%) is land and 0.31 square miles (0.80 km^{2}) (or 1.27%) is water.

=== Cities ===
- Caledonia
- Loves Park (west edge)
- Poplar Grove (east edge)
- Timberlane (northwest three-quarters)

=== Extinct towns ===
- North Caledonia

=== Cemeteries ===
The township contains Drake Cemetery.

=== Major highways ===
- Illinois State Route 173

== Demographics ==
As of the 2020 census there were 7,294 people, 2,375 households, and 1,932 families residing in the township. The population density was 299.23 inhabitants per square mile (115.53/km^{2}). There were 2,590 housing units at an average density of 106.25 per square mile (41.02/km^{2}). The racial makeup of the township was 80.55% White, 2.92% African American, 0.51% Native American, 1.86% Asian, 0.03% Pacific Islander, 4.73% from other races, and 9.40% from two or more races. Hispanic or Latino of any race were 13.41% of the population.

There were 2,375 households, out of which 43.00% had children under the age of 18 living with them, 66.61% were married couples living together, 4.46% had a female householder with no spouse present, and 18.65% were non-families. 17.50% of all households were made up of individuals, and 9.60% had someone living alone who was 65 years of age or older. The average household size was 3.09 and the average family size was 3.50.

The township's age distribution consisted of 25.4% under the age of 18, 11.1% from 18 to 24, 23.3% from 25 to 44, 30.4% from 45 to 64, and 9.7% who were 65 years of age or older. The median age was 36.1 years. For every 100 females, there were 114.1 males. For every 100 females age 18 and over, there were 99.6 males.

The median income for a household in the township was $97,642, and the median income for a family was $102,008. Males had a median income of $71,508 versus $37,549 for females. The per capita income for the township was $39,922. About 0.4% of families and 0.3% of the population were below the poverty line, including 0.1% of those under age 18 and 0.1% of those age 65 or over.

Historical population
| Census | Pop. | Note | %± |
|---|---|---|---|
| 2010 | 7,439 | | — |
| 2020 | 7,294 | | −1.9% |
U.S. Decennial Census

== School districts ==
- Belvidere Community Unit School District 100
- North Boone Community Unit School District 200
- Rockford Public School District 205

== Schools ==
- Caledonia Elementary School

== Political districts ==
- Illinois's 16th congressional district
- State House District 69
- State Senate District 35
