= Poplar Grove Township, Illinois =

Poplar Grove Township
- Township
- Location in Boone County

- Boone County's location in Illinois
- Coordinates: 42°22′11″N 88°49′22″W
- Country: United States
- State: Illinois
- County: Boone
- Settlement: November 6, 1849

Area
  - Total: 23.84 sq mi (61.7 km^{2})
  - Land: 23.78 sq mi (61.6 km^{2})
  - Water: 0.06 sq mi (0.16 km^{2}) 0.25%
- Elevation: 902 ft (275 m)

Population (2020)
  - Total: 5,131
  - Density: 215.8/sq mi (83.31/km^{2})
- Time zone: UTC-6 (CST)
  - Summer (DST): UTC-5 (CDT)
- ZIP codes: 61008, 61011, 61012, 61065
- FIPS code: 17-007-61158

Poplar Grove Township is one of nine townships in Boone County, Illinois, USA. As of the 2020 census, its population was 5,131 and it contained 1,834 housing units. Poplar Grove Township was formed from parts of Caledonia Township and Boone Township after 1921.

== Geography ==
According to the 2010 census, the township has a total area of 23.84 square miles (61.7 km^{2}), of which 23.78 square miles (61.6 km^{2}) (or 99.75%) is land and 0.06 square miles (0.16 km^{2}) (or 0.25%) is water.

=== Cities ===
- Poplar Grove (north three-quarters)
- Timberlane (northeast quarter)

=== Cemeteries ===
The township contains these five cemeteries: Clark, Ewins, Popular Grove, Russellville and South Poplar Grove.

=== Major highways ===
- Illinois State Route 76
- Illinois State Route 173

== Demographics ==
As of the 2020 census there were 5,131 people, 1,698 households, and 1,369 families residing in the township. The population density was 215.41 inhabitants per square mile (83.17/km^{2}). There were 1,834 housing units at an average density of 76.99 per square mile (29.73/km^{2}). The racial makeup of the township was 78.60% White, 1.54% African American, 0.41% Native American, 1.17% Asian, 0.00% Pacific Islander, 7.78% from other races, and 10.50% from two or more races. Hispanic or Latino of any race were 17.70% of the population.

There were 1,698 households, out of which 55.00% had children under the age of 18 living with them, 76.03% were married couples living together, 2.41% had a female householder with no spouse present, and 19.38% were non-families. 12.20% of all households were made up of individuals, and 5.10% had someone living alone who was 65 years of age or older. The average household size was 3.01 and the average family size was 3.36.

The township's age distribution consisted of 34.2% under the age of 18, 6.7% from 18 to 24, 29.3% from 25 to 44, 21.4% from 45 to 64, and 8.5% who were 65 years of age or older. The median age was 33.6 years. For every 100 females, there were 94.6 males. For every 100 females age 18 and over, there were 90.2 males.

The median income for a household in the township was $69,864, and the median income for a family was $73,927. Males had a median income of $58,132 versus $21,556 for females. The per capita income for the township was $28,254. About 4.5% of families and 5.2% of the population were below the poverty line, including 8.3% of those under age 18 and 0.7% of those age 65 or over.

Historical population
Census	Pop.	Note	%±
2010	5,099		—
2020	5,131		0.6%
U.S. Decennial Census

== School districts ==
- Belvidere Community Unit School District 100
- North Boone Community Unit School District 200

== Political districts ==
- Illinois's 16th congressional district
- State House District 69
- State Senate District 35
