= Spring Township, Illinois =

Spring Township
- Township
- Location in Boone County

- Boone County's location in Illinois
- Coordinates: 42°11′49″N 88°45′25″W
- Country: United States
- State: Illinois
- County: Boone
- Settlement: November 6, 1849

Area
  - Total: 36.15 sq mi (93.6 km^{2})
  - Land: 36.1 sq mi (93 km^{2})
  - Water: 0.05 sq mi (0.13 km^{2}) 0.14%
- Elevation: 860 ft (262 m)

Population (2020)
  - Total: 864
  - Density: 23.9/sq mi (9.24/km^{2})
- Time zone: UTC-6 (CST)
  - Summer (DST): UTC-5 (CDT)
- ZIP codes: 60135, 60145, 61008, 61038
- FIPS code: 17-007-71578

Spring Township is one of nine townships in Boone County, Illinois, USA. As of the 2020 census, its population was 864 and it contained 368 housing units. Spring was founded as "Concord" on November 6, 1849, then was renamed "Ohio" in April, 1851, and finally "Spring" in October, 1851.

== Geography ==
According to the 2010 census, the township has a total area of 36.15 square miles (93.6 km^{2}), of which 36.1 square miles (93 km^{2}) (or 99.86%) is land and 0.05 square miles (0.13 km^{2}) (or 0.14%) is water.

=== Cities ===
- Belvidere (east edge)

=== Unincorporated towns ===
- Herbert

=== Cemeteries ===
The township contains Shattucks Grove Cemetery.

=== Major highways ===
- Interstate 90

=== Airports and landing strips ===
- Henderson Airport

== Demographics ==
As of the 2020 census there were 864 people, 297 households, and 132 families residing in the township. The population density was 23.94 inhabitants per square mile (9.24/km^{2}). There were 368 housing units at an average density of 10.20 per square mile (3.94/km^{2}). The racial makeup of the township was 83.80% White, 0.58% African American, 0.69% Native American, 0.58% Asian, 0.12% Pacific Islander, 7.06% from other races, and 7.18% from two or more races. Hispanic or Latino of any race were 13.08% of the population.

There were 297 households, out of which 22.90% had children under the age of 18 living with them, 28.96% were married couples living together, 1.35% had a female householder with no spouse present, and 55.56% were non-families. 55.60% of all households were made up of individuals, and 35.70% had someone living alone who was 65 years of age or older. The average household size was 3.10 and the average family size was 5.12.

The township's age distribution consisted of 31.5% under the age of 18, 12.7% from 18 to 24, 18.8% from 25 to 44, 17% from 45 to 64, and 19.9% who were 65 years of age or older. The median age was 36.3 years. For every 100 females, there were 140.2 males. For every 100 females age 18 and over, there were 136.0 males.

The median income for a household in the township was $71,420, and the median income for a family was $103,971. Males had a median income of $75,595 versus $15,875 for females. The per capita income for the township was $26,306. About 0.0% of families and 17.0% of the population were below the poverty line, including 0.0% of those under age 18 and 49.7% of those age 65 or over.

Historical population
Census	Pop.	Note	%±
2010	894		—
2020	864		−3.4%
U.S. Decennial Census

== School districts ==
- Belvidere Community Unit School District 100

== Political districts ==
- Illinois' 16th congressional district
- State House District 69
- State Senate District 35
