= Manchester Township, Illinois =

Manchester Township
- Township
- Location in Boone County

- Boone County's location in Illinois
- Coordinates: 42°27′36″N 88°52′58″W
- Country: United States
- State: Illinois
- County: Boone
- Settlement: November 6, 1849

Area
  - Total: 33.53 sq mi (86.8 km^{2})
  - Land: 33.51 sq mi (86.8 km^{2})
  - Water: 0.02 sq mi (0.052 km^{2}) 0.06%
- Elevation: 922 ft (281 m)

Population (2020)
  - Total: 871
  - Density: 26.0/sq mi (10.0/km^{2})
- Time zone: UTC-6 (CST)
  - Summer (DST): UTC-5 (CDT)
- ZIP codes: 61011, 61065, 61073, 61080
- FIPS code: 17-007-46318

Manchester Township is one of nine townships in Boone County, Illinois, USA. As of the 2020 census, its population was 871 and it contained 380 housing units.

== Geography ==
According to the 2010 census, the township has a total area of 33.53 square miles (86.8 km^{2}), of which 33.51 square miles (86.8 km^{2}) (or 99.94%) is land and 0.02 square miles (0.052 km^{2}) (or 0.06%) is water.

=== Unincorporated towns ===
- Hunter

=== Cemeteries ===
The township contains these four cemeteries: Bamblett, Forest Hill, Livingston and Oak Hill.

=== Major highways ===
- Illinois State Route 76

=== Airports and landing strips ===
- Compass Rose Airport (Carner RLA N42.27.0 W088.54.5)
- McCurdy Strip
- Nemec Airport

== Demographics ==
As of the 2020 census there were 871 people, 206 households, and 164 families residing in the township. The population density was 25.99 inhabitants per square mile (10.03/km^{2}). There were 380 housing units at an average density of 11.34 per square mile (4.38/km^{2}). The racial makeup of the township was 94.49% White, 0.23% African American, 0.57% Native American, 0.23% Asian, 0.23% Pacific Islander, 0.69% from other races, and 3.56% from two or more races. Hispanic or Latino of any race were 2.53% of the population.

There were 206 households, out of which 15.50% had children under the age of 18 living with them, 72.33% were married couples living together, 7.28% had a female householder with no spouse present, and 20.39% were non-families. 17.00% of all households were made up of individuals, and 17.00% had someone living alone who was 65 years of age or older. The average household size was 2.49 and the average family size was 2.84.

The township's age distribution consisted of 11.7% under the age of 18, 1.9% from 18 to 24, 10.8% from 25 to 44, 41.7% from 45 to 64, and 33.7% who were 65 years of age or older. The median age was 56.6 years. For every 100 females, there were 76.3 males. For every 100 females age 18 and over, there were 79.8 males.

The median income for a household in the township was $119,500, and the median income for a family was $143,182. Males had a median income of $65,714 versus $48,250 for females. The per capita income for the township was $75,581. None of the population was below the poverty line.

Historical population
Census	Pop.	Note	%±
2010	895		—
2020	871		−2.7%
U.S. Decennial Census

== School districts ==
- Belvidere Community Unit School District 100
- North Boone Community Unit School District 200

== Political districts ==
- Illinois's 16th congressional district
- State House District 69
- State Senate District 35
