= Poplar Grove Township =

Poplar Grove Township may refer to the following townships in the United States:

- Poplar Grove Township, Boone County, Illinois
- Poplar Grove Township, Roseau County, Minnesota
