= Candlewick Lake, Illinois =

- CDP
- Location of Candlewick Lake in Boone County, Illinois.
- Coordinates: 42°21′09″N 88°52′26″W
- Country: United States
- State: Illinois
- County: Boone

Area
  - Total: 2.14 sq mi (5.53 km^{2})
  - Land: 1.85 sq mi (4.79 km^{2})
  - Water: 0.29 sq mi (0.75 km^{2})
- Elevation: 896 ft (273 m)

Population (2020)
  - Total: 5,115
  - Density: 2,767.1/sq mi (1,068.37/km^{2})
- Time zone: UTC-6 (Central (CST))
  - Summer (DST): UTC-5 (CDT)
- Area codes: 815 & 779
- GNIS feature ID: 2727441

Candlewick Lake is an unincorporated, gated community in Boone County, Illinois, United States. Candlewick Lake is located between Poplar Grove and Timberlane; the community includes a lake with the same name. It is part of the Rockford, Illinois Metropolitan Statistical Area. As of the 2020 census, Candlewick Lake had a population of 5,115.

Water source provided by Aqua Illinois privatized water corporation.

== Demographics ==
Historical population
Census	Pop.	Note	%±
2020	5,115		—
U.S. Decennial Census

=== Racial and ethnic composition ===
Candlewick Lake CDP, Illinois – Racial and ethnic composition Note: the US Census treats Hispanic/Latino as an ethnic category. This table excludes Latinos from the racial categories and assigns them to a separate category. Hispanics/Latinos may be of any race.
Race / Ethnicity (NH = Non-Hispanic)	Pop 2020	2020
White alone (NH)	3,597	70.32%
Black or African American alone (NH)	171	3.34%
Native American or Alaska Native alone (NH)	9	0.18%
Asian alone (NH)	42	0.82%
Native Hawaiian or Pacific Islander alone (NH)	1	0.02%
Other race alone (NH)	14	0.27%
Mixed race or Multiracial (NH)	260	5.08%
Hispanic or Latino (any race)	1,021	19.96%
Total	5,115	100.00%

=== 2020 census ===
As of the 2020 census, Candlewick Lake had a population of 5,115. The median age was 36.7 years. 26.7% of residents were under the age of 18 and 12.2% of residents were 65 years of age or older. For every 100 females there were 105.9 males, and for every 100 females age 18 and over there were 102.8 males age 18 and over.

100.0% of residents lived in urban areas, while 0.0% lived in rural areas.

There were 1,694 households in Candlewick Lake, of which 38.8% had children under the age of 18 living in them. Of all households, 62.2% were married-couple households, 14.2% were households with a male householder and no spouse or partner present, and 16.4% were households with a female householder and no spouse or partner present. About 16.5% of all households were made up of individuals and 6.9% had someone living alone who was 65 years of age or older.

There were 1,831 housing units, of which 7.5% were vacant. The homeowner vacancy rate was 1.8% and the rental vacancy rate was 6.7%.

== Education ==
Most of it is in the Belvidere Consolidated Unit School District 100, while a portion is in the North Boone Community Unit School District 200.
