= Bonus Township, Illinois =

Bonus Township
- Township
- Location in Boone County

- Boone County's location in Illinois
- Coordinates: 42°17′03″N 88°46′25″W
- Country: United States
- State: Illinois
- County: Boone
- Settlement: November 6, 1849

Area
  - Total: 35.81 sq mi (92.7 km^{2})
  - Land: 35.52 sq mi (92.0 km^{2})
  - Water: 0.29 sq mi (0.75 km^{2}) 0.81%
- Elevation: 797 ft (243 m)

Population (2020)
  - Total: 4,375
  - Density: 123.2/sq mi (47.56/km^{2})
- Time zone: UTC-6 (CST)
  - Summer (DST): UTC-5 (CDT)
- ZIP codes: 60152, 61008, 61038, 61065
- FIPS code: 17-007-07302

Bonus Township is one of nine townships in Boone County, Illinois, United States. As of the 2020 census, its population was 4,375 and it contained 1,485 housing units.

== Geography ==
According to the 2010 census, the township has a total area of 35.81 square miles (92.7 km^{2}), of which 35.52 square miles (92.0 km^{2}) (or 99.19%) is land and 0.29 square miles (0.75 km^{2}) (or 0.81%) is water.

=== Cities ===
- Belvidere (east edge)
- Poplar Grove (southeast edge)

=== Unincorporated towns ===
- Garden Prairie

(This list is based on USGS data and may include former settlements.)

=== Cemeteries ===
The township contains these four cemeteries: Andrus, East Bonus, Garden Prairie and Lawrenceville.

=== Major highways ===
- US Route 20

=== Airports and landing strips ===
- Bob Walberg Field
- Green Giant-Dillon F777arm Heliport

== Demographics ==
As of the 2020 census there were 4,375 people, 1,470 households, and 1,201 families residing in the township. The population density was 121.95 inhabitants per square mile (47.09/km^{2}). There were 1,485 housing units at an average density of 41.39 per square mile (15.98/km^{2}). The racial makeup of the township was 69.81% White, 2.88% African American, 1.07% Native American, 1.60% Asian, 0.00% Pacific Islander, 13.07% from other races, and 11.57% from two or more races. Hispanic or Latino of any race were 27.47% of the population.

There were 1,470 households, out of which 32.00% had children under the age of 18 living with them, 67.69% were married couples living together, 6.19% had a female householder with no spouse present, and 18.30% were non-families. 15.70% of all households were made up of individuals, and 3.30% had someone living alone who was 65 years of age or older. The average household size was 2.90 and the average family size was 3.21.

The township's age distribution consisted of 19.5% under the age of 18, 11.6% from 18 to 24, 17% from 25 to 44, 38.4% from 45 to 64, and 13.4% who were 65 years of age or older. The median age was 45.8 years. For every 100 females, there were 116.2 males. For every 100 females age 18 and over, there were 117.3 males.

The median income for a household in the township was $82,500, and the median income for a family was $93,011. Males had a median income of $60,370 versus $34,480 for females. The per capita income for the township was $34,535. About 4.6% of families and 5.3% of the population were below the poverty line, including 7.7% of those under age 18 and 2.8% of those age 65 or over.

Historical population
Census	Pop.	Note	%±
2010	4,340		—
2020	4,375		0.8%
U.S. Decennial Census

== School districts ==
- Belvidere Community Unit School District 100
- North Boone Community Unit School District 200

== Political districts ==
- Illinois' 16th congressional district
- State House District 69
- State Senate District 35
