= Illinois Route 173 =

State highway in northern Illinois, US

Illinois Route 173
- Rosecrans Road
- IL 173 highlighted in red

Route information
- Maintained by IDOT
- Length: 66.20 mi (106.54 km)
- Existed: 1924–present

Major junctions
- West end: IL 251 in Machesney Park
- I-39 Toll / I-90 Toll / US 51 in Loves Park; US 14 in Harvard; US 12 in Richmond; US 45 in Antioch I-94 Toll in Zion; US 41 in Zion
- East end: IL 137 in Zion

Location
- Country: United States
- State: Illinois
- Counties: Lake, McHenry, Boone, Winnebago

Highway system
- Illinois State Highway System; Interstate; US; State; Tollways; Scenic
← IL 172	→ IL 174

Illinois Route 173 (IL 173) is a 66.20-mile-long (106.54 km) east–west state highway in northern Illinois. Route 173 runs from Illinois 251 in Machesney Park to Illinois 137 in Zion. The northernmost east-west route in the state, the highway is routed through the suburbs of both Rockford and Chicago. Much of IL 173 passes through rural areas, serving multiple small and unincorporated communities.

IL 173 is the only state highway that directly connects I-39/90 and I-94 to each other (with US 20 being the other example). It also crosses multiple north-south state highways that connect to I-90, including IL 47 (Hebron), IL 59, IL 83, and US 45 (Antioch), and US 41 (Wadsworth).

In 2008, the entirety of Illinois 173 was officially designated the 173rd Airborne Brigade Highway

== Route description ==
Illinois 173 travels across Illinois from Machesney Park in suburban Rockford to Zion in northeastern Lake County. For over 95% of its length, the route is configured with two lanes (the only four-lane portion being in Machesney Park).

For its entire length, the route is within 10 miles of the Illinois-Wisconsin border (with much of its length, routed within 1-5 miles of the state line). On I-39/90, IL 173 is the third exit into Illinois and serves as the second exit into Illinois on I-94.

=== Winnebago and Boone Counties ===
IL 173 begins in northern Machesney Park at an intersection with IL 251 (North Second Street), becoming West Lane Road. After forming the northern border of Rock Cut State Park, the route passes through an interchange with I-39/90. As it passes north of Argyle, the route is reduced to two lanes (maintaining the configuration until its eastern terminus).

Entering Boone County, IL 173 passes through Caledonia. After passing IL 76, the route forms the northern portion of Poplar Grove before moving northeast towards Capron.

=== McHenry County ===
As it enters McHenry County, IL 173 moves northeast again, passing through Chemung before it enters Harvard as West Brink Street, where it carried northward by US 14 (Division Street), crossing over the UP-NW commuter rail line for approximately ½ mile. At a 5-way traffic intersection, IL 173 turns westward (becoming Diggins Street), heading further northeast towards unincorporated Alden.

Continuing eastward, the route crosses IL 47 in Hebron. In Richmond, the IL 173 reaches its northernmost point (1 mile south of the Illinois state line) as it enters Richmond to cross US 12 (2 miles north of IL 31) – this marks the point where the route enters the Chicago suburbs.

=== Lake County ===
After passing into Lake County, IL 173 crosses the Fox River to enter the Chain O'Lakes region. Surrounded by Channel Lake, Lake Marie, and Antioch Lake, the route takes a winding path as it crosses through Antioch. where it forms the northern terminus of IL 59 (Fox Lake Road); three blocks eastward, it crosses IL 83 (Main Street). After passing US 45, the route continues eastward, meeting I-94 (Tri-State Tollway) in Old Mill Creek and US 41 (Skokie Highway) in Rosecrans.

After passing through Wadsworth, IL 173 passes into Zion following its intersection with IL 131 (Green Bay Road). In its last two miles, the route becomes a two-lane residential street (Bethlehem Avenue, 21st Street), ending at the intersection of 21st Street and IL 137 (Sheridan Road), 2½ miles south of the Wisconsin border.

== History ==
In its original routing, SBI Route 173 extended into Loves Park (along Forest Hills Road), ending in Rockford at the intersection of US 51 (IL 251 today) and Forest Hills Road near the Rock River. In 1967, the route was truncated to its current routing in Rockford, continuing straight westward (in the current Machesney Park, meeting US 51 at its intersection with Ralston Road. From 1972 to 1994, the highway was extended eastward, carrying Sheridan Road through Winthrop Harbor, ending as it became WIS 32.

In July 2007, an interchange was constructed, linking the route with I-39/I-90/US 50 (Jane Addams Tollway), providing an east-west link between I-90 and I-94 (and between US 51 and US 41).

== Major intersections ==
County	Location	mi	km	Destinations	Notes
Winnebago	Machesney Park	0.0	0.0	IL 251 (2nd Street)	
Winnebago	Machesney Park–Loves Park village line	1.3	2.1	CR 11 (Perryville Road)	
Winnebago	Machesney Park–Loves Park village line	3.6	5.8	I-39 Toll / I-90 Toll / US 51 Toll (Jane Addams Memorial Tollway) – Chicago, Rockford, Madison	
Winnebago	Caledonia	4.6	7.4	CR 25 (Belvidere Road)	
Boone	Caledonia	9.4	15.1	IL 76 (Fairgrounds Road)	
McHenry	Harvard	22.8	36.7	US 14 east (Division Street)	West end of US 14 overlap
McHenry	Harvard	23.3	37.5	US 14 west (Division Street)	East end of US 14 overlap
McHenry	Harvard	25.4	40.9	CR A18 east (Altenberg Road)	
McHenry	Alden	28.9	46.5	CR A15 west (Oak Grove Road)	
McHenry	Hebron	34.1	54.9	IL 47 (Main Street)	
McHenry	Richmond	39.1	62.9	CR V30 (Keystone Road)	
McHenry	Richmond	40.6	65.3	US 12 (Main Street)	
McHenry	Spring Grove	44.5	71.6	CR V43 south (Richardson Road)	
Lake	Antioch	48.5	78.1	CR V51 north (Lake Avenue)	
Lake	Antioch	51.3	82.6	IL 59 south	
Lake	Antioch	52.1	83.8	IL 83 (Main Street)	
Lake	Antioch	56.1	90.3	US 45	
Lake	Old Mill Creek	58.3	93.8	CR W15 (Hunt Club Road)	
Lake	Old Mill Creek	58.8	94.6	I-94 Toll east (Tri-State Tollway) – Chicago	
Lake	Rosecrans	59.7	96.1	US 41 (Skokie Highway) to I-41 north / I-94 west	
Lake	Zion	63.0	101.4	IL 131 (Green Bay Road)	
Lake	Zion	64.4	103.6	CR W34 (Lewis Avenue)	
Lake	Zion	66.20	106.54	IL 137 / LMCT (Sheridan Road)	
1.000 mi = 1.609 km; 1.000 km = 0.621 mi: Concurrency terminus
