= Flora Township, Illinois =

Flora Township
- Township
- Location in Boone County

- Boone County's location in Illinois
- Coordinates: 42°11′34″N 88°53′26″W
- Country: United States
- State: Illinois
- County: Boone
- Settlement: November 6, 1849

Area
  - Total: 36.49 sq mi (94.5 km^{2})
  - Land: 36.46 sq mi (94.4 km^{2})
  - Water: 0.03 sq mi (0.078 km^{2}) 0.08%
- Elevation: 869 ft (265 m)

Population (2020)
  - Total: 2,994
  - Density: 82.12/sq mi (31.71/km^{2})
- Time zone: UTC-6 (CST)
  - Summer (DST): UTC-5 (CDT)
- ZIP codes: 60145, 60146, 61008, 61016
- FIPS code: 17-007-26441

Flora Township is one of nine townships in Boone County, Illinois, USA. As of the 2020 census, its population was 2,994 and it contained 1,217 housing units. Flora Township was originally named Fairfield on November 6, 1849, but was changed to Burton in April, 1851, and then changed again to Flora in October, 1851.

== Geography ==
According to the 2010 census, the township has a total area of 36.49 square miles (94.5 km^{2}), of which 36.46 square miles (94.4 km^{2}) (or 99.92%) is land and 0.03 square miles (0.078 km^{2}) (or 0.08%) is water.

=== Cities ===
- Belvidere (south edge)
- Cherry Valley (east edge)

=== Unincorporated towns ===
- Irene

=== Cemeteries ===
The township contains these two cemeteries: Bloods Point and Flora.

=== Major highways ===
- Interstate 90
- US Route 20

== Demographics ==
As of the 2020 census there were 2,994 people, 1,070 households, and 745 families residing in the township. The population density was 82.00 inhabitants per square mile (31.66/km^{2}). There were 1,217 housing units at an average density of 33.33 per square mile (12.87/km^{2}). The racial makeup of the township was 71.24% White, 2.07% African American, 0.80% Native American, 0.87% Asian, 0.07% Pacific Islander, 13.29% from other races, and 11.66% from two or more races. Hispanic or Latino of any race were 26.42% of the population.

There were 1,070 households, out of which 35.40% had children under the age of 18 living with them, 60.75% were married couples living together, 7.76% had a female householder with no spouse present, and 30.37% were non-families. 19.90% of all households were made up of individuals, and 15.10% had someone living alone who was 65 years of age or older. The average household size was 2.65 and the average family size was 3.08.

The township's age distribution consisted of 19.0% under the age of 18, 7.0% from 18 to 24, 24.9% from 25 to 44, 24.5% from 45 to 64, and 24.5% who were 65 years of age or older. The median age was 44.5 years. For every 100 females, there were 81.4 males. For every 100 females age 18 and over, there were 92.3 males.

The median income for a household in the township was $67,344, and the median income for a family was $71,510. Males had a median income of $42,250 versus $27,049 for females. The per capita income for the township was $30,108. About 4.6% of families and 4.7% of the population were below the poverty line, including 3.6% of those under age 18 and 1.6% of those age 65 or over.

Historical population
Census	Pop.	Note	%±
2010	2,981		—
2020	2,994		0.4%
U.S. Decennial Census

== School districts ==
- Belvidere Community Unit School District 100
- Hiawatha Community Unit School District 426

== Political districts ==
- Illinois' 16th congressional district
- State House District 69
- State Senate District 35
