= Leroy Township, Illinois =

LeRoy Township
- Township
- Location in Boone County

- Boone County's location in Illinois
- Coordinates: 42°27′30″N 88°45′53″W
- Country: United States
- State: Illinois
- County: Boone
- Settlement: November 6, 1849

Area
  - Total: 31.28 sq mi (81.0 km^{2})
  - Land: 31.27 sq mi (81.0 km^{2})
  - Water: 0.01 sq mi (0.026 km^{2}) 0.03%
- Elevation: 942 ft (287 m)

Population (2020)
  - Total: 485
  - Density: 15.5/sq mi (5.99/km^{2})
- Time zone: UTC-6 (CST)
  - Summer (DST): UTC-5 (CDT)
- ZIP codes: 60033, 61012, 61065
- GNIS feature ID: 0429247
- FIPS code: 17-007-42951

LeRoy Township is one of nine townships in Boone County, Illinois, USA. As of the 2020 census, its population was 485 and it contained 201 housing units.

== Geography ==
According to the 2010 census, the township has a total area of 31.28 square miles (81.0 km^{2}), of which 31.27 square miles (81.0 km^{2}) (or 99.97%) is land and 0.01 square miles (0.026 km^{2}) (or 0.03%) is water.

=== Unincorporated towns ===
- Blaine

=== Cemeteries ===
The township contains these five cemeteries: Blaine, Burr Oak, Dullam, Stone School and Round Prairie.

=== Airports and landing strips ===
- Munch Heliport
- Pine Hill Airport

== Demographics ==
As of the 2020 census there were 485 people, 175 households, and 126 families residing in the township. The population density was 15.51 inhabitants per square mile (5.99/km^{2}). There were 201 housing units at an average density of 6.43 per square mile (2.48/km^{2}). The racial makeup of the township was 89.48% White, 0.41% African American, 0.62% Native American, 0.41% Asian, 0.00% Pacific Islander, 4.95% from other races, and 4.12% from two or more races. Hispanic or Latino of any race were 7.84% of the population.

There were 175 households, out of which 15.40% had children under the age of 18 living with them, 68.00% were married couples living together, 4.00% had a female householder with no spouse present, and 28.00% were non-families. 17.70% of all households were made up of individuals, and 5.10% had someone living alone who was 65 years of age or older. The average household size was 2.65 and the average family size was 2.98.

The township's age distribution consisted of 7.5% under the age of 18, 17.9% from 18 to 24, 7.5% from 25 to 44, 52.3% from 45 to 64, and 14.7% who were 65 years of age or older. The median age was 51.9 years. For every 100 females, there were 123.1 males. For every 100 females age 18 and over, there were 116.7 males.

The median income for a household in the township was $70,089, and the median income for a family was $59,167. Males had a median income of $39,519 versus $18,958 for females. The per capita income for the township was $36,592. No families and 4.5% of the population were below the poverty line, including 28.6% of those under age 18 and none of those age 65 or over.

Historical population
Census	Pop.	Note	%±
2010	485		—
2020	485		0.0%
U.S. Decennial Census

== School districts ==
- Harvard Community Unit School District 50
- North Boone Community Unit School District 200

== Political districts ==
- Illinois's 16th congressional district
- State House District 69
- State Senate District 35
