= The Real Dirt on Farmer John =

2005 documentary directed by Taggart Siegel

- Directed by: Taggart Siegel
- Written by: John Peterson
- Produced by: Taggart Siegel; Teri Lang
- Narrated by: John Peterson
- Cinematography: Taggart Siegel
- Edited by: Greg Snider
- Music by: Mark Orton; Dirty Three
- Distributed by: CAVU Pictures
- Release date: 2005
- Running time: 82 minutes
- Country: United States
- Language: English

The Real Dirt on Farmer John is a 2005 documentary film directed by Taggart Siegel about the life of Midwestern farmer John Peterson, operator of Angelic Organics. It tells the history of the eccentric farmer's family farm in rural Caledonia, Illinois.

== Reception ==
On review aggregator website Rotten Tomatoes, the film holds an approval rating of 88% based on 41 reviews, with an average rating of 7.6/10.

== Awards ==
The Real Dirt on Farmer John won 31 awards at film festivals. This includes the first ever Reel Current Al Gore Award at the Nashville Film Festival, the Audience Award at the Chicago International Documentary Festival, the Grand Jury Award at the San Francisco International Film Festival, the Audience Award at the Slamdance Film Festival and the Italian Environmental Film Festival.
