= Angelic Organics =

Farm in Illinois, U.S.

Coordinates: 42°27′14″N 88°54′39″W

- Formation: 1990
- Founder: John Peterson
- Founded at: Caledonia, Illinois, USA
- Products: Vegetables and Herbs
- Services: Community supported agriculture
- Methods: Biodynamic Farming
- Members: 2,000 families (2016)
- Website: www.angelicorganics.com

Angelic Organics was a Community Supported Agriculture (CSA) farm located in Caledonia, Illinois. It was one of the oldest CSAs in the United States before it closed. The farm began growing produce in accordance with organic and biodynamic principles in 1990. Participating subscribers, known as shareholders, received a weekly 3/4 bushel box of fresh vegetables and herbs delivered to one of 40 Chicago area sites.

Angelic Organics's founder, John Peterson, was the focus of the award winning documentary film The Real Dirt on Farmer John.

The farm closed in 2024 after Peterson suffered a stroke.
