= Boone Township, Illinois =

Boone Township
- Township
- Location in Boone County

- Boone County's location in Illinois
- Coordinates: 42°22′14″N 88°44′59″W
- Country: United States
- State: Illinois
- County: Boone
- Settlement: November 6, 1849

Area
  - Total: 24.03 sq mi (62.2 km^{2})
  - Land: 23.94 sq mi (62.0 km^{2})
  - Water: 0.09 sq mi (0.23 km^{2}) 0.37%
- Elevation: 896 ft (273 m)

Population (2020)
  - Total: 1,993
  - Density: 83.25/sq mi (32.14/km^{2})
- Time zone: UTC-6 (CST)
  - Summer (DST): UTC-5 (CDT)
- ZIP codes: 61008, 61012, 61038, 61065
- FIPS code: 17-007-07328

Boone Township is one of nine townships in Boone County, Illinois, USA. As of the 2020 census, its population was 1,993 and it contained 726 housing units.

== Geography ==
According to the 2010 census, the township has a total area of 24.03 square miles (62.2 km^{2}), of which 23.94 square miles (62.0 km^{2}) (or 99.63%) is land and 0.09 square miles (0.23 km^{2}) (or 0.37%) is water.

=== Cities ===
- Capron

=== Unincorporated towns ===
- Russellville

=== Cemeteries ===
The township contains these four cemeteries: Capron, Chester, County Line and Long Prairie.

=== Major highways ===
- Illinois State Route 173

== Demographics ==
As of the 2020 census there were 1,993 people, 694 households, and 525 families residing in the township. The population density was 82.93 inhabitants per square mile (32.02/km^{2}). There were 726 housing units at an average density of 30.21 units per square mile (11.66 units/km^{2}). The racial makeup of the township was 68.49% White, 0.85% African American, 0.60% Native American, 0.20% Asian, 0.00% Pacific Islander, 16.96% from other races, and 12.90% from two or more races. Hispanic or Latino of any race were 31.51% of the population.

There were 694 households, out of which 50.60% had children under the age of 18 living with them, 40.92% were married couples living together, 11.38% had a female householder with no spouse present, and 24.35% were non-families. 18.30% of all households were made up of individuals, and 6.90% had someone living alone who was 65 years of age or older. The average household size was 3.23 and the average family size was 3.58.

The township's age distribution consisted of 30.5% under the age of 18, 9.3% from 18 to 24, 31.7% from 25 to 44, 21.7% from 45 to 64, and 6.9% who were 65 years of age or older. The median age was 30.5 years. For every 100 females, there were 123.2 males. For every 100 females age 18 and over, there were 120.7 males.

The median income for a household in the township was $80,000, and the median income for a family was $85,172. Males had a median income of $43,482 versus $24,364 for females. The per capita income for the township was $26,457. About 6.3% of families and 8.2% of the population were below the poverty line, including 9.9% of those under age 18 and 13.6% of those age 65 or over.

Historical population
Census	Pop.	Note	%±
2010	1,968		—
2020	1,993		1.3%
U.S. Decennial Census

== School districts ==
- North Boone Community Unit School District 200

== Political districts ==
- Illinois' 16th congressional district
- State House District 69
- State Senate District 35
