= Belvidere Daily Republican =

Daily newspaper published in Belvidere, Illinois

- Type: Daily newspaper
- Owner(s): Rock Valley Publishing
- Founder(s): Frank T. Moran
- Founded: 1894
- Headquarters: 130 S State St, Belvidere, IL 61008
- ISSN: 2473-8042
- OCLC number: 29328915
- Website: rvpnews.com/category/belvidere-republican

Belvidere Daily Republican is a daily newspaper published in Belvidere, Illinois. It is the main newspaper for Boone County, Illinois.

== History ==
The newspaper was founded in 1894 by Frank T. Moran, and the paper's headquarters were originally located at 112 West Pleasant St. Moran served as the paper's managing editor and publisher until his death in 1949. Like many community newspapers of the 19th century, it was originally founded as a means of promoting the Republican Party from which the paper derives its name.
