= Normal Township, McLean County, Illinois =

Coordinates: 40°32′07″N 88°59′05″W

Normal Township
- Township
- Location in McLean County

- McLean County's location in Illinois
- Country: United States
- State: Illinois
- County: McLean
- Established: November 3, 1857

Area
  - Total: 31.96 sq mi (82.8 km^{2})
  - Land: 31.89 sq mi (82.6 km^{2})
  - Water: 0.06 sq mi (0.16 km^{2}) 0.19%

Population (2010)
  - Estimate (2016): 54,274
  - Density: 1,647.9/sq mi (636.3/km^{2})
- Time zone: UTC-6 (CST)
  - Summer (DST): UTC-5 (CDT)
- FIPS code: 17-113-53247
- Website: normaltownship.org

Normal Township is located in McLean County, Illinois. As of the 2010 census, its population was 52,560 and it contained 18,861 housing units. The majority of the township is occupied by the town of Normal.

== Geography ==
According to the 2010 census, the township has a total area of 31.96 square miles (82.8 km^{2}), of which 31.89 square miles (82.6 km^{2}) (or 99.78%) is land and 0.06 square miles (0.16 km^{2}) (or 0.19%) is water.

== Demographics ==
Historical population
Census	Pop.	Note	%±
2016 (est.)	54,274
U.S. Decennial Census
