= Fondulac Township, Tazewell County, Illinois =

Coordinates: 40°43′00″N 89°32′00″W

Fondulac Township
- Township
- Location in Tazewell County
- Country: United States
- State: Illinois
- County: Tazewell
- Established: November 6, 1849

Area
  - Total: 21.4 sq mi (55 km^{2})
  - Land: 17.7 sq mi (46 km^{2})
  - Water: 3.7 sq mi (9.6 km^{2}) 17.29%

Population (2010)
  - Estimate (2016): 13,067
  - Density: 755.8/sq mi (291.8/km^{2})
- Time zone: UTC-6 (CST)
  - Summer (DST): UTC-5 (CDT)
- FIPS code: 17-179-26636
- Website: fondulactownship.com

Fondulac Township is located in Tazewell County, Illinois. As of the 2010 census, its population was 13,381 and it contained 6,099 housing units.

== Geography ==
According to the 2010 census, the township has a total area of 21.4 square miles (55 km^{2}), of which 17.7 square miles (46 km^{2}) (or 82.71%) is land and 3.7 square miles (9.6 km^{2}) (or 17.29%) is water.

== Demographics ==
Historical population
Census	Pop.	Note	%±
2016 (est.)	13,067
U.S. Decennial Census

According to the township's official figures from the 2020 Census, the population declined to 12,489, a decrease of 892 people (−6.67%) from 2010. The 2020 population yields a population density of roughly 706 persons per square mile.

The community is predominantly White. Recent estimates place the racial and ethnic composition at roughly 92–93% White, with smaller shares of Black or African American, Asian, American Indian/Alaska Native, people of two or more races, and a Hispanic or Latino population of around 3%.
