= Belvidere North High School =

Location
- 9393 Beloit Road; Belvidere, Illinois 61008; United States; 42°17′23″N 88°51′51″W

Information
- School type: Public Secondary
- Established: 2007
- School district: Belvidere Community Unit School District 100
- Superintendent: Cassandra Schug
- Principal: Jim Friesema
- Teaching staff: 94.90 (FTE)
- Grades: 9–12
- Gender: Coed
- Enrollment: 1,408 (2023-2024)
- Student to teacher ratio: 14.84
- Campus type: Urban
- Colors: Navy Blue; Scarlet Red; Vegas Gold
- Song: Thundering Blue
- Fight song: Thundering Blue
- Athletics conference: Northern Illinois Conference (NIC-10)
- Mascot: Bolt
- Nickname: Blue Thunder
- Newspaper: The North View
- Website: School website

Belvidere North High School is the second high school in Belvidere, Illinois and part of the Belvidere Community Unit School District 100. It is right next to Seth Whitman Elementary School and Belvidere Central Middle School.

== Athletics ==
Belvidere North's team name is Blue Thunder. They are part of the NIC-10 conference. The school's sports teams include volleyball, football, baseball, basketball, tennis, bowling, swimming, track and field, soccer, golf, cross country.
