= John Baumgarten =

American politician (1902–1963)

Mayor of Cherry Valley, Illinois
- In office 1945

Member of the Illinois House of Representatives
- In office 1939–1940

Personal details
- Born: May 26, 1902 Rockford, Illinois, U.S.
- Died: November 23, 1963 (aged 61) Rockford, Illinois, U.S.
- Party: Democratic
- Occupation: Politician, businessman

John Baumgarten (May 26, 1902 – November 23, 1963) was an American businessman and politician.

Baumgarten was born in Rockford, Illinois and attended Rockford public schools. Baumgarten worked for the Rockford Screw Products and was the personnel manager. He lived in Rockford, Illinois with his wife. Baumgarten served in the Illinois House of Representatives in 1939 and 1940 and was a Democrat. In 1943, Baumgarten and his wife moved to Cherry Valley, Illinois. He served as mayor of Cherry Valley in 1945. Baumgarten died at Swedish American Hospital in Rockford, Illinois.
