= Rockford Township, Illinois =

Rockford Township
- Location in Winnebago County

- Location of Illinois in the United States

- Location within Illinois
- Coordinates: 42°14′54″N 89°04′27″W
- Country: United States
- State: Illinois
- County: Winnebago

Government
  - Supervisor: Jasper St. Angel

Area
  - Total: 112.8 sq mi (292.2 km^{2})
  - Land: 111 sq mi (287 km^{2})
  - Water: 1.9 sq mi (5 km^{2})
- Elevation: 734.9 ft (224.0 m)

Population (2010)
  - Estimate (2016): 172,291
- Time zone: UTC-6 (CST)
  - Summer (DST): UTC-5 (CDT)
- PIN: 815
- FIPS code: 17-201-65013
- Website: www.rockfordtownshipil.gov

Rockford Township is located in Winnebago County, Illinois, United States. As of the 2010 census, its population was 178,527 and it contained 78,714 housing units. It is the largest township, in terms of area, in Illinois. The city of Rockford, along with the villages of Cherry Valley and New Milford are all located in Rockford Township.

== History ==
Township government for Winnebago County was formed on November 6, 1849. The township government didn't become effective until the next year on April 1, 1850. Rockford Township would later annex two of the original sixteen townships of the county. On May 1, 1916, New Milford Township annexation was approved, followed by Guilford Township in 1929.

== Geography ==
According to the 2010 census, the township has a total area of 112.83 square miles (292.2 km^{2}), of which 110.96 square miles (287.4 km^{2}) (or 98.34%) is land and 1.87 square miles (4.8 km^{2}) (or 1.66%) is water.

=== Cities, towns, villages ===
- Cherry Valley (small portion)
- Loves Park (small portion)
- New Milford (vast majority)
- Rockford (vast majority)

=== Other Communites ===
- Kishwaukee at 42.16478°N 89.14669°W
- Ruby at 42.315853°N 89.070938°W
- Westmoreland at 42.275021°N 89.162605°W
- Woodcrest at 42.181969°N 89.142609°W

== Demographics ==
Historical population
Census	Pop.	Note	%±
2016 (est.)	172,291
U.S. Decennial Census
