= Leroy M. Green =

American politician

Leroy M. Green (May 8, 1882 – March 8, 1941) was an American politician.

Green was born in Cherry Valley Township, Winnebago County, Illinois and graduated from Rockford High School in Rockford, Illinois in 1900. He went to University of Illinois and to University of Wisconsin Law School. He served in the Illinois House of Representatives from 1923 to 1937 and from 1939 until his death in 1941. Green was a Republican. Green died in Rockford, Illinois after an illness that lasted for a few weeks.
