= Glenn W. Birkett =

American farmer and politician

Glenn W. Birkett (February 9, 1888 – April 13, 1950) was an American farmer and politician.

Born in Caledonia, Illinois, Birkett received his bachelor's degree from Beloit College and was a farmer. He served in the United States Army during World War I in the Northern Russian Expedition and also served during World War II. Birkett was a Republican. He served as chairman of the Rochester, Wisconsin Town Board and on the Racine County, Wisconsin Board of Supervisors. Birkett ran for the United States House of Representatives in 1941 and lost the election. During the 1949 session, Birkett served in the Wisconsin State Assembly. He died while still in office while attempting to remove a boulder on his property in Rochester, Wisconsin with the use of dynamite, injuring himself. Birkett was found by two of his sons and he died in a hospital in Burlington, Wisconsin a few hours later as the result of his injuries.
