= Lexington Township, McLean County, Illinois =

Coordinates: 40°37′20″N 88°44′26″W

Lexington Township
- Township
- Location in McLean County

- McLean County's location in Illinois
- Country: United States
- State: Illinois
- County: McLean
- Established: November 3, 1857

Area
  - Total: 40.96 sq mi (106.1 km^{2})
  - Land: 40.95 sq mi (106.1 km^{2})
  - Water: 0.01 sq mi (0.026 km^{2}) 0.02%

Population (2010)
  - Estimate (2016): 2,382
  - Density: 58.6/sq mi (22.6/km^{2})
- Time zone: UTC-6 (CST)
  - Summer (DST): UTC-5 (CDT)
- FIPS code: 17-113-43107

Lexington Township is located in McLean County, Illinois. As of the 2010 census, its population was 2,399 and it contained 1,005 housing units.

== Geography ==
According to the 2010 census, the township has a total area of 40.96 square miles (106.1 km^{2}), of which 40.95 square miles (106.1 km^{2}) (or 99.98%) is land and 0.01 square miles (0.026 km^{2}) (or 0.02%) is water.

== Demographics ==
Historical population
Census	Pop.	Note	%±
2016 (est.)	2,382
U.S. Decennial Census
