= Russellville, Boone County, Illinois =

Russellville, Illinois
- Unincorporated community
- Location within Illinois Location within the United States
- Coordinates: 42°19′41″N 88°47′01″W
- Country: United States
- State: Illinois
- County: Boone
- Elevation: 801 ft (244 m)
- Time zone: UTC-6 (Central (CST))
  - Summer (DST): UTC-5 (CDT)
- Area codes: 815 & 779
- GNIS feature ID: 423141

Russellville is an unincorporated community in Boone County, Illinois, United States. Russellville is southeast of Poplar Grove.
