= Hunter, Illinois =

- Unincorporated community
- Location within Illinois Location within the United States
- Coordinates: 42°25′44″N 88°52′15″W
- Country: United States
- State: Illinois
- County: Boone
- Elevation: 965 ft (294 m)
- Time zone: UTC-6 (Central (CST))
  - Summer (DST): UTC-5 (CDT)
- Area codes: 815 & 779
- GNIS feature ID: 422831

Hunter is an unincorporated community in Boone County, Illinois, United States. Hunter is northwest of Poplar Grove and north of Timberlane.
