= Walnut Township, Bureau County, Illinois =

Walnut Township
- Township
- Location in Bureau County

- Bureau County's location in Illinois
- Coordinates: 41°32′23″N 89°33′55″W
- Country: United States
- State: Illinois
- County: Bureau
- Established: November 6, 1849

Area
  - Total: 36.91 sq mi (95.6 km^{2})
  - Land: 36.86 sq mi (95.5 km^{2})
  - Water: 0.04 sq mi (0.10 km^{2}) 0.11%
- Elevation: 771 ft (235 m)

Population (2020)
  - Total: 1,597
  - Density: 43.33/sq mi (16.73/km^{2})
- Time zone: UTC-6 (CST)
  - Summer (DST): UTC-5 (CDT)
- ZIP codes: 61349, 61376
- FIPS code: 17-011-78539

Walnut Township is one of twenty-five townships in Bureau County, Illinois, United States. As of the 2020 census, its population was 1,597 and it contained 722 housing units.

== Geography ==
According to the 2010 census, the township has a total area of 36.91 square miles (95.6 km^{2}), of which 36.86 square miles (95.5 km^{2}) (or 99.86%) is land and 0.04 square miles (0.10 km^{2}) (or 0.11%) is water.

=== Villages ===
- Walnut

=== Cemeteries ===
- Red Oak
- Walnut

=== Major highways ===
- Illinois Route 92

== Demographics ==
As of the 2020 census there were 1,597 people, 622 households, and 395 families residing in the township. The population density was 43.25 inhabitants per square mile (16.70/km^{2}). There were 722 housing units at an average density of 19.55 per square mile (7.55/km^{2}). The racial makeup of the township was 95.80% White, 0.19% African American, 0.00% Native American, 0.13% Asian, 0.00% Pacific Islander, 0.13% from other races, and 3.76% from two or more races. Hispanic or Latino of any race were 2.32% of the population.

There were 622 households, out of which 30.10% had children under the age of 18 living with them, 46.14% were married couples living together, 8.68% had a female householder with no spouse present, and 36.50% were non-families. 33.40% of all households were made up of individuals, and 15.00% had someone living alone who was 65 years of age or older. The average household size was 2.28 and the average family size was 2.86.

The township's age distribution consisted of 21.2% under the age of 18, 7.3% from 18 to 24, 22.6% from 25 to 44, 27.4% from 45 to 64, and 21.5% who were 65 years of age or older. The median age was 43.6 years. For every 100 females, there were 99.2 males. For every 100 females age 18 and over, there were 98.6 males.

The median income for a household in the township was $47,794, and the median income for a family was $71,250. Males had a median income of $38,417 versus $21,667 for females. The per capita income for the township was $26,064. About 6.6% of families and 8.5% of the population were below the poverty line, including 7.1% of those under age 18 and 3.2% of those age 65 or over.

Historical population
Census	Pop.	Note	%±
2010	1,752		—
2020	1,597		−8.8%
US Decennial Census

== School districts ==
- Bureau Valley Community Unit School District 340

== Political districts ==
- Illinois's 11th congressional district
- State House District 74
- State Senate District 37
