= Argyle, Illinois =

Argyle
- Census-designated place
- Location of Argyle within Illinois Argyle (the United States)
- Coordinates: 42°21′17″N 88°56′21″W
- Country: United States
- State: Illinois
- County: Boone, Winnebago

Area
  - Total: 0.88 sq mi (2.27 km^{2})
  - Land: 0.88 sq mi (2.27 km^{2})
  - Water: 0 sq mi (0.00 km^{2})
- Elevation: 902 ft (275 m)

Population (2020)
  - Total: 332
  - Density: 378.6/sq mi (146.16/km^{2})
- Time zone: UTC-6 (CST)
  - Summer (DST): UTC-5 (CDT)
- Postal code: 61004
- Area codes: 815, 779
- FIPS code: 17-02050
- GNIS feature ID: 2804650

Argyle is an unincorporated community and census-designated place in Boone and Winnebago counties in the U.S. state of Illinois, northeast of Rockford. It is part of the Rockford, Illinois Metropolitan Statistical Area. As of the 2020 census, Argyle had a population of 332.

== History ==
Argyle was named by an early settler who was a native of Argyll, in Scotland.

Argyle was hit by the November 22, 2010 tornado that affected Northern Illinois and Southern Wisconsin. It was rated EF2 on the Enhanced Fujita Scale.

== Geography ==
According to the 2021 census gazetteer files, Argyle has a total area of 0.88 square miles (2.28 km^{2}), all land.

== Demographics ==
Historical population
Census	Pop.	Note	%±
2020	332		—
U.S. Decennial Census

Argyle first appeared as a census designated place in the 2020 U.S. census.

=== Racial and ethnic composition ===
Argyle CDP, Illinois – Racial and ethnic composition Note: the US Census treats Hispanic/Latino as an ethnic category. This table excludes Latinos from the racial categories and assigns them to a separate category. Hispanics/Latinos may be of any race.
Race / Ethnicity (NH = Non-Hispanic)	Pop 2020	2020
White alone (NH)	292	87.95%
Black or African American alone (NH)	0	0.00%
Native American or Alaska Native alone (NH)	0	0.00%
Asian alone (NH)	2	0.60%
Native Hawaiian or Pacific Islander alone (NH)	0	0.00%
Other race alone (NH)	1	0.30%
Mixed race or Multiracial (NH)	21	6.33%
Hispanic or Latino (any race)	16	4.82%
Total	332	100.00%

=== 2020 census ===
As of the 2020 census there were 332 people, 128 households, and 128 families residing in the CDP. The population density was 378.56 inhabitants per square mile (146.16/km^{2}). There were 152 housing units at an average density of 173.32 per square mile (66.92/km^{2}). The racial makeup of the CDP was 88.86% White, 0.60% Asian, 0.00% Pacific Islander, 2.41% from other races, and 8.13% from two or more races. Hispanic or Latino of any race were 4.82% of the population.

There were 128 households, out of which 34.4% had children under the age of 18 living with them, and all were married couples living together. The average household size was 2.76 and the average family size was 2.76.

The CDP's age distribution consisted of 23.8% under the age of 18, 5.9% from 18 to 24, 16.7% from 25 to 44, 47.9% from 45 to 64, and 5.7% who were 65 years of age or older. The median age was 48.5 years. For every 100 females, there were 111.4 males. For every 100 females age 18 and over, there were 103.8 males.

The median income for a household in the CDP was $139,821, and the median income for a family was $139,821. Males had a median income of $62,450 versus $26,042 for females. The per capita income for the CDP was $51,234. None of the population was below the poverty line.

== Education ==
Within Winnebago County, all of Argyle is in the Rockford School District 205. Within Boone County, most of it is in the Rockford district, and a portion is in the Belvidere Consolidated Unit School District 100.
