= Roscoe Township, Illinois =

Roscoe Township
- Township
- Location in Winnebago County
- Coordinates: 42°26′57″N 88°59′38″W
- Country: United States
- State: Illinois
- County: Winnebago
- Established: November 6, 1849

Government
  - Supervisor: Bob Nowicki

Area
  - Total: 31.27 sq mi (81.0 km^{2})
  - Land: 30.69 sq mi (79.5 km^{2})
  - Water: 0.58 sq mi (1.5 km^{2}) 1.85%
- Elevation: 778 ft (237 m)

Population (2010)
  - Estimate (2016): 19,225
  - Density: 641.8/sq mi (247.8/km^{2})
- Time zone: UTC-6 (CST)
  - Summer (DST): UTC-5 (CDT)
- FIPS code: 17-201-65624
- Website: roscoetownship.org

Roscoe Township is located in Winnebago County, Illinois. As of the 2010 census, its population was 19,694 and it contained 7,497 housing units.

Roscoe Township was named for William Roscoe, an English historian.

== Geography ==
According to the 2010 census, the township has a total area of 31.27 square miles (81.0 km^{2}), of which 30.69 square miles (79.5 km^{2}) (or 98.15%) is land and 0.58 square miles (1.5 km^{2}) (or 1.85%) is water.

== Demographics ==
Historical population
Census	Pop.	Note	%±
2016 (est.)	19,225
U.S. Decennial Census
