= Blaine, Illinois =

- Unincorporated community
- Location within Illinois Location within the United States
- Coordinates: 42°26′49″N 88°48′11″W
- Country: United States
- State: Illinois
- County: Boone
- Elevation: 984 ft (300 m)
- Time zone: UTC-6 (Central (CST))
  - Summer (DST): UTC-5 (CDT)
- Area codes: 815 & 779
- GNIS feature ID: 404535

Blaine is an unincorporated community in Boone County, Illinois, United States. Blaine is northwest of Capron and north-northeast of Poplar Grove.
