= Owen Township, Illinois =

Owen Township
- Township
- Location in Winnebago County
- Coordinates: 42°22′08″N 89°06′58″W
- Country: United States
- State: Illinois
- County: Winnebago
- Established: November 6, 1849

Government
  - Supervisor: Sidney Moate

Area
  - Total: 35.59 sq mi (92.2 km^{2})
  - Land: 35.3 sq mi (91 km^{2})
  - Water: 0.3 sq mi (0.78 km^{2}) 0.84%
- Elevation: 817 ft (249 m)

Population (2010)
  - Estimate (2016): 3,702
  - Density: 107.7/sq mi (41.6/km^{2})
- Time zone: UTC-6 (CST)
  - Summer (DST): UTC-5 (CDT)
- FIPS code: 17-201-57069
- Website: www.owentownshipillinois.com

Owen Township is located in Winnebago County, Illinois. As of the 2010 census, its population was 3,803 and it contained 1,546 housing units.

== Geography ==
According to the 2010 census, the township has a total area of 35.59 square miles (92.2 km^{2}), of which 35.3 square miles (91 km^{2}) (or 99.19%) is land and 0.3 square miles (0.78 km^{2}) (or 0.84%) is water.

== Demographics ==
Historical population
Census	Pop.	Note	%±
2016 (est.)	3,702
U.S. Decennial Census
