= Rockton Township, Illinois =

Coordinates: 42°27′12″N 89°05′53″W

Rockton Township
- Township
- Location in Winnebago County
- Country: United States
- State: Illinois
- County: Winnebago

Government
  - Supervisor: Kathie Gummow

Area
  - Total: 37.42 sq mi (96.9 km^{2})
  - Land: 36.22 sq mi (93.8 km^{2})
  - Water: 1.19 sq mi (3.1 km^{2}) 3.18%

Population (2010)
  - Estimate (2016): 15,971
  - Density: 453.9/sq mi (175.3/km^{2})
- Time zone: UTC-6 (CST)
  - Summer (DST): UTC-5 (CDT)
- FIPS code: 17-201-65169

Rockton Township is located in Winnebago County, Illinois. As of the 2010 census, its population was 16,441 and it contained 6,822 housing units.

== Geography ==
According to the 2010 census, the township has a total area of 37.42 square miles (96.9 km^{2}), of which 36.22 square miles (93.8 km^{2}) (or 96.79%) is land and 1.19 square miles (3.1 km^{2}) (or 3.18%) is water.

== Demographics ==
Historical population
Census	Pop.	Note	%±
2016 (est.)	15,971
U.S. Decennial Census
