= Irene, Illinois =

- Unincorporated community
- Location within Illinois Location within the United States
- Coordinates: 42°10′13″N 88°54′01″W
- Country: United States
- State: Illinois
- County: Boone
- Elevation: 817 ft (249 m)
- Time zone: UTC-6 (Central (CST))
  - Summer (DST): UTC-5 (CDT)
- Area codes: 815 & 779
- GNIS feature ID: 410916(dead link)

Irene is an unincorporated community in Boone County, Illinois, United States. Irene is located along a railroad line southeast of Cherry Valley.
