= Cherry Valley, Illinois =

- Village
- Logo

- Location of Cherry Valley in Winnebago and Boone County, Illinois.
- Coordinates: 42°14′05″N 88°57′42″W
- Country: US
- State: Illinois
- Counties: Winnebago, Boone
- Townships: Cherry Valley, Rockford, Belvidere, Flora
- Incorporated: January 31, 1857

Government
  - Village President: Jim E. Claeyssen

Area
  - Total: 8.66 sq mi (22.42 km^{2})
  - Land: 8.41 sq mi (21.77 km^{2})
  - Water: 0.25 sq mi (0.65 km^{2})
- Elevation: 719 ft (219 m)

Population (2020)
  - Total: 2,905
  - Estimate (2024): 2,888 ▼
  - Density: 345.6/sq mi (133.45/km^{2})
- Time zone: UTC-6 (CST)
  - Summer (DST): UTC-5 (CDT)
- ZIP code: 61016
- Area code: 815
- FIPS code: 17-13074
- GNIS feature ID: 2397612
- Website: www.cherryvalley.org

Cherry Valley is a village of 8.72 square miles (22.6 km^{2}) that lies primarily in Winnebago County, Illinois. Approximately ten percent of the village is within Boone County. The village is within the Rockford, Illinois Metropolitan Statistical Area, and borders the southeast side of Rockford. It is also within the Kishwaukee River valley. The population was 2,905 at the 2020 census, down from 3,162 as of the 2010 census.

== History ==
Official documents from the Winnebago County Clerk's office and the Village of Cherry Valley state Cherry Valley was settled in 1836. The first settler within Cherry Valley was Joseph Griggs who, along with his family, settled on the north bank of the Kishwaukee River in 1835. Cherry Valley was incorporated as a village on January 31, 1857. Early landmark events for Cherry Valley was the establishment of a mill on the Kishwaukee River, and the coming of the railroad in 1852.

Early on Cherry Valley was called by various names, such as "Griggs Ford" and Graball, and then other names, before the present name was adopted. After deciding to change the name, the people put their suggestions into a hat. A Mrs. Butler, from Cherry Valley, New York placed the name of Cherry Valley in the hat and that name was selected. The core of the village, centered on its main street businesses in small brick buildings, is surrounded by several blocks of houses built in the 19th century. This late 19th-century appearance is further accentuated by turn-of-the-20th-century-style lamp lights as well as the original brick paving along the eastern end of main street.

=== Relationship with Rockford ===
Although close to Rockford, Cherry Valley was far enough away to be considered, for most of its history, not a part of the Rockford community. However, with the advent of car-centric transportation in the latter twentieth century, Cherry Valley became in essence a suburb of Rockford. As the city of Rockford grew and expanded its boundaries, it came in direct contact with Cherry Valley. Since that time, there have been land control-related issues between the two municipalities. For the most part, these issues have been resolved with a boundary agreement between the two communities.

=== Cherry Valley today ===
In the last dozen years (as of 2007) Cherry Valley had seen a shift towards Chicago, with roughly a third of its new residents being former Chicago suburban residents who live in the village and commute to work in the Chicago suburbs. Being near to an interchange on I-90 (Jane Addams Memorial Tollway) contributed to this shift, and in 2006 the toll booths on the Cherry Valley interchange and exit were removed because of increased traffic flow and the need to remove the chronic traffic jams that had built over the years.

Most of Cherry Valley is within the Rockford School District, with a small portion in the Belvidere School District. Schools were closed and demolished in 2019.

== Geography ==
The core of the village is located a little north of the confluence of the north and south branches of the Kishwaukee river. There is a slight depression as one moves towards the center of the village, which is a formation of the Kishwaukee river valley.

According to the 2021 census gazetteer files, Cherry Valley has a total area of 8.66 square miles (22.43 km^{2}), of which 8.41 square miles (21.78 km^{2}) (or 97.09%) is land and 0.25 square miles (0.65 km^{2}) (or 2.91%) is water. The north branch of the Kishwaukee River travels through Cherry Valley's central business district. The largest body of water in the village is Cherry Valley Lake which is situated just east of the Kishwaukee River in Baumann Park. The village is served by Interstate 90, Interstate 39, U.S. Route 20 and U.S. Route 51.

== Demographics ==
Historical population
Census	Pop.	Note	%±
1900	349		—
1910	433		24.1%
1920	480		10.9%
1930	587		22.3%
1940	583		−0.7%
1950	741		27.1%
1960	875		18.1%
1970	952		8.8%
1980	946		−0.6%
1990	1,615		70.7%
2000	2,191		35.7%
2010	3,162		44.3%
2020	2,905		−8.1%
U.S. Decennial Census; 2012 Estimate

=== 2020 census ===
As of the 2020 census, Cherry Valley had a population of 2,905. The median age was 53.2 years. 15.4% of residents were under the age of 18 and 28.9% of residents were 65 years of age or older. For every 100 females there were 91.5 males, and for every 100 females age 18 and over there were 89.0 males age 18 and over.

96.1% of residents lived in urban areas, while 3.9% lived in rural areas.

There were 1,269 households in Cherry Valley, of which 22.4% had children under the age of 18 living in them. Of all households, 50.0% were married-couple households, 18.7% were households with a male householder and no spouse or partner present, and 25.1% were households with a female householder and no spouse or partner present. About 30.7% of all households were made up of individuals and 14.2% had someone living alone who was 65 years of age or older.

There were 1,338 housing units, of which 5.2% were vacant. The homeowner vacancy rate was 1.1% and the rental vacancy rate was 6.5%. The population density was 335.57 inhabitants per square mile (129.56/km^{2}), and housing units had an average density of 154.56 per square mile (59.68/km^{2}).

Racial composition as of the 2020 census
Race	Number	Percent
White	2,390	82.3%
Black or African American	89	3.1%
American Indian and Alaska Native	3	0.1%
Asian	145	5.0%
Native Hawaiian and Other Pacific Islander	0	0.0%
Some other race	65	2.2%
Two or more races	213	7.3%
Hispanic or Latino (of any race)	207	7.1%

=== Income and poverty ===
The median income for a household in the village was $68,397, and the median income for a family was $79,750. Males had a median income of $47,663 versus $40,228 for females. The per capita income for the village was $35,460. About 3.4% of families and 6.6% of the population were below the poverty line, including none of those under age 18 and 10.7% of those age 65 or over.

== Economy ==
Key to the village economy is million square foot CherryVale Mall, one of the first enclosed shopping malls in Illinois. CherryVale, which draws shoppers from a radius of over 50 miles (80 km), produces the greatest single source of revenue for the village, in the form of a 1% sales tax that is levied and collected by the State of Illinois and then distributed to the community. Because of this sales tax, Cherry Valley is one of only a handful of communities within Illinois that does not levy a municipal property tax.

Another notable commercial enterprise in Cherry Valley is the Kegel Motorcycle Company, which has a strong claim to being the world's oldest Harley-Davidson dealership.

The town is home to Six Flags Hurricane Harbor Rockford, formerly Magic Waters, which is owned by Rockford Park District and is managed by Six Flags starting 2018.

== Transportation ==
RMTD provides bus service on Route 19 connecting Cherry Valley to Rockford and other destinations.

The Union Pacific line to Rockford runs through Cherry Valley.

== Education ==
The portion in Winnebago County (the overwhelming majority of the city) is in the Rockford School District 205.

The portion in Boone County is in the Belvidere Consolidated Unit School District 100.

== Notable people ==
- Virgil Abloh is a DJ and fashion designer, with notable brands Off-White and Pyrex Vision.
- John Baumgarten. Businessman, Illinois state representative and mayor of Cherry Valley in 1945
- Mo Pitney (born 1993), country music artist
