= Timberlane, Illinois =

Timberlane, Illinois Timberline
- Village
- Location of Timberlane in Boone County, Illinois.
- Coordinates: 42°20′23″N 88°52′40″W
- Country: US
- State: Illinois
- County: Boone
- Townships: Caledonia, Poplar Grove
- Incorporated: 1995

Area
  - Total: 1.76 sq mi (4.57 km^{2})
  - Land: 1.75 sq mi (4.52 km^{2})
  - Water: 0.019 sq mi (0.05 km^{2})
- Elevation: 886 ft (270 m)

Population (2020)
  - Total: 906
  - Estimate (2024): 902 ▼
  - Density: 518.9/sq mi (200.33/km^{2})
- Time zone: UTC-6 (CST)
  - Summer (DST): UTC-5 (CDT)
- ZIP code: 61008, 61086
- Area codes: 815 & 779
- FIPS code: 17-75360
- GNIS feature ID: 2399984
- Website: villageoftimberlane.org

Timberlane (locally known as Timberline) is a village in Boone County, Illinois, United States. It is part of the Rockford, Illinois Metropolitan Statistical Area. The population was 906 at the 2020 census.

== History ==
Timberlane was incorporated as a village in 1995.

== Geography ==
According to the 2021 census gazetteer files, Timberlane has a total area of 1.77 square miles (4.58 km^{2}), of which 1.75 square miles (4.53 km^{2}) (or 98.92%) is land and 0.02 square miles (0.05 km^{2}) (or 1.08%) is water.

== Demographics ==
Historical population
Census	Pop.	Note	%±
2000	234		—
2010	934		299.1%
2020	906		−3.0%
U.S. Decennial Census

As of the 2020 census there were 906 people, 345 households, and 319 families residing in the village. The population density was 513.31 inhabitants per square mile (198.19/km^{2}). There were 304 housing units at an average density of 172.24 per square mile (66.50/km^{2}). The racial makeup of the village was 86.87% White, 3.20% African American, 1.88% Asian, 1.88% from other races, and 6.18% from two or more races. Hispanic or Latino of any race were 7.84% of the population.

There were 345 households, out of which 40.0% had children under the age of 18 living with them, 82.90% were married couples living together, 5.22% had a female householder with no husband present, and 7.54% were non-families. 6.38% of all households were made up of individuals, and 3.48% had someone living alone who was 65 years of age or older. The average household size was 3.48 and the average family size was 3.36.

The village's age distribution consisted of 21.5% under the age of 18, 18.0% from 18 to 24, 14.2% from 25 to 44, 40.2% from 45 to 64, and 6.0% who were 65 years of age or older. The median age was 43.2 years. For every 100 females, there were 82.6 males. For every 100 females age 18 and over, there were 74.1 males.

The median income for a household in the village was $170,875, and the median income for a family was $171,625. Males had a median income of $100,527 versus $55,139 for females. The per capita income for the village was $55,343. About 2.2% of families and 2.0% of the population were below the poverty line, including 0.8% of those under age 18 and 5.7% of those age 65 or over.

== Education ==
Most of it is in the Belvidere Consolidated Unit School District 100, while a portion is in the North Boone Community Unit School District 200.
