= Herbert, Illinois =

- Unincorporated community
- Location within Illinois Location within the United States
- Coordinates: 42°09′17″N 88°46′34″W
- Country: United States
- State: Illinois
- County: Boone
- Elevation: 873 ft (266 m)
- Time zone: UTC-6 (Central (CST))
  - Summer (DST): UTC-5 (CDT)
- Area codes: 815 & 779
- GNIS feature ID: 410090

Herbert is an unincorporated community in Boone County, Illinois, United States. Herbert is south of Belvidere and northwest of Genoa.

== History ==
A post office was established in the town in 1886; it closed in 1913, reopened in 1923, and closed again in 1933. The community was named for the son of a settler.
