= Boone County, Illinois =

County in Illinois, United States

- County
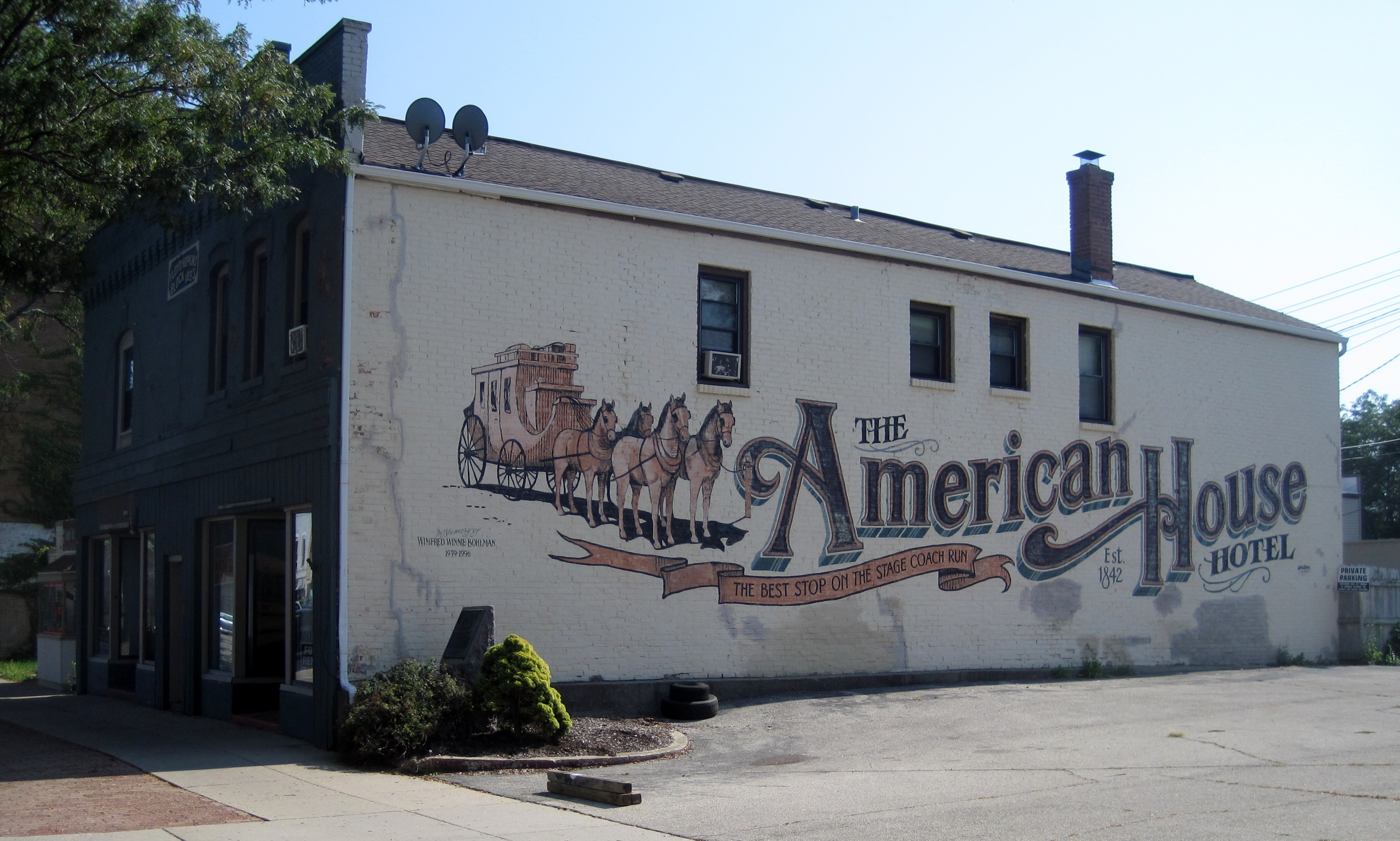
- Floyd Hopkins Block in the Belvidere North State Street Historic District

- Location within the U.S. state of Illinois
- Coordinates: 42°20′N 88°49′W
- Country: United States
- State: Illinois
- Founded: March 3, 1836
- Named for: Daniel Boone
- Seat: Belvidere
- Largest city: Belvidere

Area
  - Total: 282.039 sq mi (730.48 km^{2})
  - Land: 280.741 sq mi (727.12 km^{2})
  - Water: 1.298 sq mi (3.36 km^{2})

Population (2020)
  - Total: 53,448
  - Estimate (2025): 53,568 ▲
  - Density: 190.38/sq mi (73.507/km^{2})
- Time zone: UTC−6 (Central)
  - Summer (DST): UTC−5 (CDT)
- Congressional districts: 11th, 16th
- Website: www.boonecountyil.gov

Boone County is a county located in the U.S. state of Illinois. As of the 2020 census, the population was 53,448. Its county seat is Belvidere. Boone County is included in the Rockford, Illinois metropolitan area.

== History ==
Unlike most of Illinois, much of Northern Illinois was not submerged in a shallow prehistoric sea. As a result, bedrock found in the area now bounded as Boone County is almost entirely Ordovician, as opposed to nearby counties like McHenry and Carroll which contain large areas of later Silurian bedrock. Till and outwash from the Illinoian glaciation covers area bedrock to a depth of several hundred feet. The county's proximity to the driftless area protected the region somewhat from the more recent Wisconsin glaciation. As a result, the county's northern townships resemble a driftless-like area, with higher peak elevations and more surface detail compared to the southern townships dominated by the broad flood plains of the Kishwaukee River and its tributaries.

By the time of the first identified human settlements, the region was made up of thickly wooded forested hills and grassy prairie plains. Archeological study at the Koster Site seems to indicate that humans had established complex societies ten thousand years ago along the river basins of the Illinois and Mississippi. By the time of European exploration, Upper Mississippian culture collapsed; westward expansion forced many Algonquin-speaking nations into conflict with each other as they moved after encroachment of their lands. Potowatomi and Mascouten tribes were still living in the region when white settlers arrived and statehood was declared in 1818.

As a political institution, Boone County was formed on March 3, 1836, out of Winnebago County. It was named for Kentucky frontiersman Daniel Boone. The first non-Native American settlers arrived in what is now Boone County in 1835. They arrived as a result of the end of the Black Hawk War as well as the completion of the Erie Canal. They consisted entirely of settlers from New England. These were "Yankee" settlers, that is to say they were descended from the English Puritans who settled New England in the colonial era. They were primarily members of the Congregational Church though due to the Second Great Awakening many of them had converted to Methodism and some had become Baptists before coming to what is now Boone County. When the New England settlers arrived in what is now Boone County there was nothing but a dense virgin forest and wild prairie. In the late 1870s immigrants began arriving from Germany and Ireland.

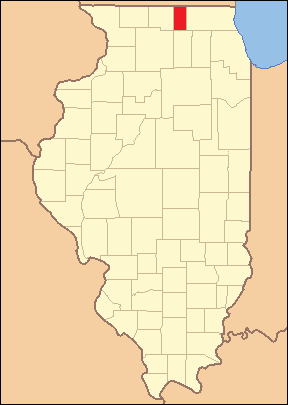
Boone County at the time of its creation in 1836

== Geography ==
According to the U.S. Census Bureau, the county has a total area of 282.039 square miles (730.48 km^{2}) (99.5%), of which 280.741 square miles (727.12 km^{2}) is land and 1.298 square miles (3.36 km^{2}) (0.5%) is water.

=== Adjacent counties ===
- Rock County, Wisconsin - north
- Walworth County, Wisconsin - northeast
- McHenry County - east
- DeKalb County - south
- Ogle County - southwest
- Winnebago County - west

=== Major highways ===
- Interstate 90
- US Route 20
- Illinois Route 76
- Illinois Route 173

Logan Avenue county route 40 Genoa Road (T-40) Garden Prairie Road county route 41 Poplar Grove Road county route 32 Capron Road (T-41)

=== Climate and weather ===
Belvidere, Illinois

Climate chart (precipitation, max. and min. temperature)
J	F	M	A	M	J	J	A	S	O	N	D
1.5 28 11	1.3 33 16	2.4 45 26	3.7 59 37	4.1 71 47	4.6 81 57	3.9 85 62	4.5 82 60	3.3 75 51	2.6 63 39	2.7 47 29	2 33 17
- █ Average max. and min. temperatures in °F
- █ Precipitation totals in inches
- Source: The Weather Channel
Metric conversion
J	F	M	A	M	J	J	A	S	O	N	D
38 −2 −12	33 1 −9	61 7 −3	94 15 3	104 22 8	116 27 14	98 29 17	114 28 16	84 24 11	66 17 4	68 8 −2	50 1 −8
- █ Average max. and min. temperatures in °C
- █ Precipitation totals in mm

In recent years, average temperatures in the county seat of Belvidere have ranged from a low of 11 °F (−12 °C) in January to a high of 85 °F (29 °C) in July, although a record low of −29 °F (−34 °C) was recorded in January 1979 and a record high of 109 °F (43 °C) was recorded in July 1936. Average monthly precipitation ranged from 1.29 inches (33 mm) in February to 4.56 inches (116 mm) in June.

== Demographics ==
2000 census age pyramid for Boone County.

Historical population
Census	Pop.	Note	%±
1840	1,705		—
1850	7,624		347.2%
1860	11,678		53.2%
1870	12,942		10.8%
1880	11,508		−11.1%
1890	12,203		6.0%
1900	15,791		29.4%
1910	15,481		−2.0%
1920	15,322		−1.0%
1930	15,078		−1.6%
1940	15,202		0.8%
1950	17,070		12.3%
1960	20,326		19.1%
1970	25,440		25.2%
1980	28,630		12.5%
1990	30,806		7.6%
2000	41,786		35.6%
2010	54,165		29.6%
2020	53,448		−1.3%
2025 (est.)	53,568	▲	0.2%
U.S. Decennial Census; 1790-1960 1900-1990; 1990-2000 2010-2013

=== 2020 census ===
As of the 2020 census, the county had a population of 53,448. The median age was 39.9 years. 25.0% of residents were under the age of 18 and 16.2% of residents were 65 years of age or older. For every 100 females there were 99.9 males, and for every 100 females age 18 and over there were 97.0 males age 18 and over.

The racial makeup of the county was 72.5% White, 2.3% Black or African American, 0.9% American Indian and Alaska Native, 1.2% Asian, <0.1% Native Hawaiian and Pacific Islander, 11.6% from some other race, and 11.4% from two or more races. Hispanic or Latino residents of any race comprised 24.1% of the population.

70.6% of residents lived in urban areas, while 29.4% lived in rural areas. There were 19,109 households in the county, of which 35.3% had children under the age of 18 living in them. Of all households, 56.6% were married-couple households, 15.2% were households with a male householder and no spouse or partner present, and 21.1% were households with a female householder and no spouse or partner present. About 21.5% of all households were made up of individuals and 10.3% had someone living alone who was 65 years of age or older. There were 20,157 housing units, of which 5.2% were vacant. Among occupied housing units, 78.4% were owner-occupied and 21.6% were renter-occupied. The homeowner vacancy rate was 1.6% and the rental vacancy rate was 6.6%.

=== Racial and ethnic composition ===
Boone County, Illinois – Racial and ethnic composition Note: the US Census treats Hispanic/Latino as an ethnic category. This table excludes Latinos from the racial categories and assigns them to a separate category. Hispanics/Latinos may be of any race.
Race / Ethnicity (NH = Non-Hispanic)	Pop 1980	Pop 1990	Pop 2000	Pop 2010	Pop 2020	% 1980	% 1990	% 2000	% 2010	% 2020
White alone (NH)	27,050	28,421	35,536	40,757	36,689	94.48%	92.26%	85.04%	75.25%	68.64%
Black or African American alone (NH)	94	121	352	976	1,171	0.33%	0.39%	0.84%	1.80%	2.19%
Native American or Alaska Native alone (NH)	42	45	86	68	72	0.15%	0.15%	0.21%	0.13%	0.13%
Asian alone (NH)	94	147	203	667	637	0.33%	0.48%	0.49%	1.23%	1.19%
Native Hawaiian or Pacific Islander alone (NH)	x	x	3	15	9	x	x	0.01%	0.03%	0.02%
Other race alone (NH)	110	7	13	49	181	0.38%	0.02%	0.03%	0.09%	0.34%
Mixed race or Multiracial (NH)	x	x	374	666	1,809	x	x	0.90%	1.23%	3.38%
Hispanic or Latino (any race)	1,240	2,065	5,219	10,967	12,880	4.33%	6.70%	12.49%	20.25%	24.10%
Total	28,630	30,806	41,786	54,165	53,448	100.00%	100.00%	100.00%	100.00%	100.00%

=== 2010 census ===
As of the 2010 United States Census, there were 54,165 people, 18,799 households, and 13,580 families residing in the county. The population density was 189.5 inhabitants per square mile (73.2/km^{2}). There were 20,157 housing units at an average density of 71.5 per square mile (27.6/km^{2}). The most common reported ancestries were German (23.7%), Irish (11.7%), Italian (7.4%), and Swedish (7.4%).

Of the 18,799 households, 31.7% had children under the age of 18 living with them, 55.5% were married couples living together, 10.6% had a female householder with no husband present, and 27.8% were non-families. 23.3% of all households were made up of individuals, and 13.0% had someone living alone who was 65 years of age or older. The average household size was 2.82 and the average family size was 3.33.

The county's age distribution consisted of 24.7% under the age of 18, 9.4% from 18 to 24, 23.1% from 25 to 44, 27.1% from 45 to 64, and 15.6% who were 65 years of age or older. The median age was 38.7 years. For every 100 females, there were 99.0 males.

The median income for a household in the county was $70.396 and the median income for a family was $84,450. Males had a median income of $50,213 versus $30,219 for females. The per capita income for the county was $32,659. About 5.0% of families and 8.2% of the population were below the poverty line, including 10.5% of those under age 18 and 6.8% of those age 65 or over.

== Education ==
K-12 school districts with sections of the county include:

- Belvidere Community Unit School District 100
- Harvard Community Unit School District 50
- Hiawatha Community Unit School District 426
- North Boone Community Unit School District 200
- Rockford Public School District 205

Additional portions of the county are covered by an elementary school district, Kinnikinnick Community Consolidated School District 131, and a secondary school district, Hononegah Community High School.

== Communities ==
Community	Community type	Population	Total Area	Water Area	Land Area	Pop. Density
Belvidere	city	25,339	12.38	0.24	12.14	2,087.06
Caledonia	village	183	1.03	0.00	1.03	176.81
Capron	village	1,395	0.77	0.00	0.77	1,806.7
Cherry Valley	village	2,905	8.66	0.25	8.40	345.63
Poplar Grove	village	5,049	7.67	0.01	7.66	658.88
Timberlane	village	906	1.76	0.02	1.75	518.90
Boone County	county	53,448	282.039	1.298	280.741	190

=== Census-designated places ===
- Argyle
- Candlewick Lake
- Garden Prairie

=== Unincorporated communities ===
- Blaine
- Herbert
- Hunter
- Irene
- Russellville

=== Townships ===
Boone County is divided into these nine townships:

- Belvidere
- Bonus
- Boone
- Caledonia
- Flora
- Leroy
- Manchester
- Poplar Grove
- Spring

== Government ==
Boone County is located in the Boone-Winnebago County Regional Office of Education #4.

Boone County, with neighboring Winnebago County, is located in Illinois's 17th Judicial Circuit. The entirety of Boone County, along with portions of southeastern Winnebago County, is in the third subcircuit.

== Politics ==
United States presidential election results for Boone County, Illinois
Year	Republican		Democratic		Third party(ies)	
Year	No.	%	No.	%	No.	%
1892	1,994	73.82%	518	19.18%	189	7.00%
1896	3,111	80.89%	657	17.08%	78	2.03%
1900	3,159	79.55%	704	17.73%	108	2.72%
1904	3,036	84.69%	302	8.42%	247	6.89%
1908	2,805	76.06%	587	15.92%	296	8.03%
1912	1,361	36.96%	540	14.67%	1,781	48.37%
1916	5,181	77.58%	1,211	18.13%	286	4.28%
1920	5,386	89.39%	496	8.23%	143	2.37%
1924	4,872	75.37%	348	5.38%	1,244	19.25%
1928	5,965	80.95%	1,371	18.60%	33	0.45%
1932	5,244	69.23%	2,239	29.56%	92	1.21%
1936	5,375	67.00%	2,383	29.71%	264	3.29%
1940	6,330	73.33%	2,277	26.38%	25	0.29%
1944	5,708	73.18%	2,074	26.59%	18	0.23%
1948	4,916	71.43%	1,941	28.20%	25	0.36%
1952	6,628	74.21%	2,287	25.60%	17	0.19%
1956	6,706	77.96%	1,890	21.97%	6	0.07%
1960	6,552	71.51%	2,605	28.43%	5	0.05%
1964	5,053	57.77%	3,694	42.23%	0	0.00%
1968	5,936	62.27%	2,801	29.38%	796	8.35%
1972	7,003	68.89%	3,131	30.80%	31	0.30%
1976	6,470	58.38%	4,458	40.23%	154	1.39%
1980	6,697	57.66%	3,175	27.34%	1,742	15.00%
1984	7,536	66.65%	3,717	32.88%	53	0.47%
1988	6,923	61.69%	4,234	37.73%	65	0.58%
1992	5,589	41.01%	5,114	37.53%	2,924	21.46%
1996	6,181	47.51%	5,345	41.09%	1,483	11.40%
2000	8,617	55.51%	6,481	41.75%	425	2.74%
2004	11,132	56.97%	8,286	42.40%	123	0.63%
2008	10,403	46.78%	11,333	50.96%	502	2.26%
2012	11,096	51.75%	9,883	46.09%	462	2.15%
2016	12,282	53.40%	8,986	39.07%	1,733	7.53%
2020	13,883	55.43%	10,542	42.09%	623	2.49%
2024	13,673	56.14%	10,159	41.71%	525	2.16%

As a historic Yankee settlement, Boone County in its early years was a major base for the Free Soil Party, being one of nine Illinois counties to vote for Martin van Buren in 1848. Its Free Soil affinities meant Boone became one of the first strongholds of the Republican Party and remained overwhelmingly Republican for the following century, although it did vote for Progressive Theodore Roosevelt in 1912 when the Republican Party was severely split. Between at least 1892 and 1928 no Democratic presidential candidate ever managed twenty percent of the county's vote, and in the century up to 1960 no Democrat reached thirty percent – a degree of GOP loyalty comparable to such famous bastions as Owsley County in Kentucky, Grant County in West Virginia, or Avery County in North Carolina. Even Barry Goldwater, who alienated the Yankee Northeast so much as to lose all but one county there, still won Boone County by 15.6 percentage points, and between 1968 and 1988 no Democrat did better than Jimmy Carter’s 40.2 percent.

The shift of the Republican Party towards an expanded Southern and Western base, and particularly its growing strength with social conservatives, alienated the Yankee North during the 1990s and 2000s, but Boone County remained in Republican hands. The candidacy of Ross Perot in 1992 and 1996 caused George H. W. Bush and Bob Dole both to win Boone County with mere pluralities against Bill Clinton, and in 2008, Illinois resident Barack Obama became the only Democrat to carry the county since James K. Polk in 1844. The 2010s have seen a reversal of this Democratic trend due to concern over employment declines in the "Rust Belt".

== See also ==
- National Register of Historic Places listings in Boone County, Illinois
- List of Boone County, Illinois topics
