= Loves Park, Illinois =

Loves Park
- City
- Flag Seal
- Motto: The City with a Heart
- Location of Loves Park in Boone County & Winnebago County, Illinois.
- Coordinates: 42°19′55″N 89°00′48″W
- Country: United States
- State: Illinois
- County: Winnebago - Boone

Government
  - Mayor: Greg Jury

Area
  - Total: 16.85 sq mi (43.65 km^{2})
  - Land: 16.32 sq mi (42.28 km^{2})
  - Water: 0.53 sq mi (1.37 km^{2})
- Elevation: 853 ft (260 m)

Population (2020)
  - Total: 23,397
  - Density: 1,433.2/sq mi (553.35/km^{2})
- Time zone: UTC−6 (CST)
  - Summer (DST): UTC−5 (CDT)
- ZIP codes: 61131, 61132, 61111, 61130
- Area codes: 779/815
- FIPS code: 17-45031
- GNIS feature ID: 2395774
- Website: https://cityoflovespark.com/

Loves Park is a city in Boone and Winnebago counties in the U.S. state of Illinois. Most of the city is in Winnebago County, with a tiny sliver in the east located in Boone County. The population was 23,397 at the 2020 census.

Loves Park is part of the Rockford metropolitan area.

== History ==
Malcolm Love, an industrialist in Rockford, Illinois, purchased 236 acres of land in this area in 1901 and set up a gathering place that came to be known as Love's Park. The city of Loves Park was incorporated in 1947. When the city's economy was negatively affected by the early 1980s recession, City Hall was moved from the Grand Avenue fire station into the Marshall Middle School to save money. In 2001, Danfoss moved their plant from Rockford to Loves Park, becoming one of the town's largest employers.

== Geography ==
According to the 2021 census gazetteer files, Loves Park has a total area of 16.85 square miles (43.64 km^{2}), of which 16.33 square miles (42.29 km^{2}) (or 96.86%) is land and 0.53 square miles (1.37 km^{2}) (or 3.14%) is water.

== Demographics ==
Historical population
Census	Pop.	Note	%±
1950	5,366		—
1960	9,086		69.3%
1970	12,390		36.4%
1980	13,192		6.5%
1990	15,462		17.2%
2000	20,044		29.6%
2010	23,996		19.7%
2020	23,397		−2.5%
U.S. Decennial Census

=== Racial and ethnic composition ===
Loves Park city, Illinois – Racial and ethnic composition Note: the US Census treats Hispanic/Latino as an ethnic category. This table excludes Latinos from the racial categories and assigns them to a separate category. Hispanics/Latinos may be of any race.
Race / Ethnicity (NH = Non-Hispanic)	Pop 2000	Pop 2010	Pop 2020	% 2000	% 2010	% 2020
White alone (NH)	18,247	20,346	18,004	91.03%	84.79%	76.95%
Black or African American alone (NH)	463	930	1,244	2.31%	3.88%	5.32%
Native American or Alaska Native alone (NH)	39	48	38	0.19%	0.20%	0.16%
Asian alone (NH)	361	625	836	1.80%	2.60%	3.57%
Native Hawaiian or Pacific Islander alone (NH)	5	3	6	0.02%	0.01%	0.03%
Other race alone (NH)	7	22	69	0.03%	0.09%	0.29%
Mixed race or Multiracial (NH)	267	416	1,120	1.33%	1.73%	4.79%
Hispanic or Latino (any race)	655	1,606	2,080	3.27%	6.69%	8.89%
Total	20,044	23,996	23,397	100.00%	100.00%	100.00%

=== 2020 census ===
As of the 2020 census, Loves Park had a population of 23,397 and 6,138 families residing in the city. The population density was 1,388.22 inhabitants per square mile (535.99/km^{2}).

The median age was 40.8 years; 20.2% of residents were under the age of 18 and 16.9% were 65 years of age or older. For every 100 females there were 94.8 males, and for every 100 females age 18 and over there were 91.4 males age 18 and over.

99.7% of residents lived in urban areas, while 0.3% lived in rural areas.

There were 10,146 households in Loves Park, of which 26.9% had children under the age of 18 living in them. Of all households, 39.8% were married-couple households, 20.3% were households with a male householder and no spouse or partner present, and 30.9% were households with a female householder and no spouse or partner present. About 33.0% of all households were made up of individuals and 12.4% had someone living alone who was 65 years of age or older.

There were 10,640 housing units at an average density of 631.30 per square mile (243.75/km^{2}), of which 4.6% were vacant. The homeowner vacancy rate was 1.7% and the rental vacancy rate was 5.5%.

Racial composition as of the 2020 census
Race	Number	Percent
White	18,583	79.4%
Black or African American	1,282	5.5%
American Indian and Alaska Native	71	0.3%
Asian	841	3.6%
Native Hawaiian and Other Pacific Islander	6	0.0%
Some other race	684	2.9%
Two or more races	1,930	8.2%

=== Income ===
The median income for a household in the city was $57,096, and the median income for a family was $66,914. Males had a median income of $49,182 versus $28,021 for females. The per capita income for the city was $31,504. About 9.9% of families and 14.7% of the population were below the poverty line, including 27.9% of those under age 18 and 6.3% of those age 65 or over.

== Education ==
The portion in Winnebago County is mostly in the Harlem Unit School District 122, with portions to the east in the Rockford School District 205. The portion in Boone County is almost entirely in the Belvidere Consolidated Unit School District 100, with a piece extending into the Rockford School District.

== Infrastructure ==
=== Transportation ===
Rockford Mass Transit District provides bus service.

== Notable people ==
- Dick Kulpa, cartoonist
- Robin Zander, lead singer of the rock band Cheap Trick.
