= Cherry Valley Township, Illinois =

Cherry Valley Township
- Township
- Location in Winnebago County
- Coordinates: 42°12′00″N 88°59′34″W
- Country: United States
- State: Illinois
- County: Winnebago
- Established: November 6, 1849

Government
  - Supervisor: Randy F Sturm

Area
  - Total: 30.72 sq mi (79.6 km^{2})
  - Land: 30.35 sq mi (78.6 km^{2})
  - Water: 0.37 sq mi (0.96 km^{2}) 1.20%
- Elevation: 709 ft (216 m)

Population (2010)
  - Estimate (2016): 19,279
  - Density: 653.5/sq mi (252.3/km^{2})
- Time zone: UTC-6 (CST)
  - Summer (DST): UTC-5 (CDT)
- FIPS code: 17-201-13087

Cherry Valley Township is located in Winnebago County, Illinois. As of the 2010 census, its population was 19,831 and it contained 8,415 housing units.

== Geography ==
According to the 2010 census, the township has a total area of 30.72 square miles (79.6 km^{2}), of which 30.35 square miles (78.6 km^{2}) (or 98.80%) is land and 0.37 square miles (0.96 km^{2}) (or 1.20%) is water.

== Demographics ==
Historical population
Census	Pop.	Note	%±
2016 (est.)	19,279
U.S. Decennial Census

== History ==
- Leroy M. Green (1882–1941), Illinois state representative, was born in Cherry Valley Township.
