= Capron, Illinois =

- Village
- Motto: "Home of the Clippers"
- Location of Capron in Boone County, Illinois.
- Coordinates: 42°23′55″N 88°44′22″W
- Country: US
- State: Illinois
- County: Boone
- Township: Boone
- Incorporated: 1887

Government
  - Mayor: Steven Bank

Area
  - Total: 0.77 sq mi (2.00 km^{2})
  - Land: 0.77 sq mi (2.00 km^{2})
  - Water: 0 sq mi (0.00 km^{2})
- Elevation: 912 ft (278 m)

Population (2020)
  - Total: 1,395
  - Estimate (2024): 1,402 ▲
  - Density: 1,806.7/sq mi (697.57/km^{2})
- Time zone: UTC-6 (CST)
  - Summer (DST): UTC-5 (CDT)
- ZIP code: 61012
- Area codes: 815 & 779
- FIPS code: 17-11124
- GNIS feature ID: 2397549
- Website: www.villageofcapron.net

Capron is a village in Boone County, Illinois, United States. It is part of the Rockford, Illinois Metropolitan Statistical Area. The population was 1,395 at the 2020 census, up from 1,376 at the 2010 census.

== History ==
The oldest known structure in the area, now known as the Capron Lutheran Church, was built in 1844. Once known as Hebron Station along the Chicago and North Western Railroad, the town was renamed in 1874 to honor Colonel John Capron who would pass only four years later. Capron was officially incorporated as a village in 1887.

== Geography ==
According to the 2021 census gazetteer files, Capron has a total area of 0.77 square miles (1.99 km^{2}), of which 0.77 square miles (1.99 km^{2}) (or 99.87%) is land and 0.00 square miles (0.00 km^{2}) (or 0.13%) is water.

Route 173 runs through the town.

== Demographics ==
Historical population
Census	Pop.	Note	%±
1880	323		—
1890	436		35.0%
1900	502		15.1%
1910	562		12.0%
1920	550		−2.1%
1930	397		−27.8%
1940	487		22.7%
1950	572		17.5%
1960	656		14.7%
1970	654		−0.3%
1980	678		3.7%
1990	682		0.6%
2000	961		40.9%
2010	1,376		43.2%
2020	1,395		1.4%
U.S. Decennial Census

=== Racial and ethnic composition ===
Capron village, Illinois – Racial and ethnic composition Note: the US Census treats Hispanic/Latino as an ethnic category. This table excludes Latinos from the racial categories and assigns them to a separate category. Hispanics/Latinos may be of any race.
Race or ethnicity (NH = Non-Hispanic)	Pop 2000	Pop 2010	Pop 2020	% 2000	% 2010	% 2020
White alone (NH)	802	916	759	83.45%	66.57%	54.41%
Black or African American alone (NH)	9	11	14	0.94%	0.80%	1.00%
Native American or Alaska Native alone (NH)	11	5	1	1.14%	0.36%	0.07%
Asian alone (NH)	5	6	3	0.52%	0.44%	0.22%
Native Hawaiian or Pacific Islander alone (NH)	0	0	0	0.00%	0.00%	0.00%
Other race alone (NH)	0	2	13	0.00%	0.15%	0.93%
Mixed race or Multiracial (NH)	11	11	34	1.14%	0.80%	2.44%
Hispanic or Latino (any race)	123	425	571	12.80%	30.89%	40.93%
Total	961	1,376	1,395	100.00%	100.00%	100.00%

=== 2020 census ===
As of the 2020 census, Capron had a population of 1,395. The population density was 1,814.04 inhabitants per square mile (700.40/km^{2}).

The median age was 33.9 years. 27.8% of residents were under the age of 18 and 10.7% were 65 years of age or older. For every 100 females, there were 110.7 males, and for every 100 females age 18 and over, there were 98.2 males age 18 and over.

0.0% of residents lived in urban areas, while 100.0% lived in rural areas.

There were 464 households and 351 families in the village. Of all households, 45.3% had children under the age of 18 living in them, 52.2% were married-couple households, 15.7% had a male householder with no spouse or partner present, and 21.8% had a female householder with no spouse or partner present. About 19.9% of all households were made up of individuals, and 6.2% had someone living alone who was 65 years of age or older. The average household size was 3.93 and the average family size was 3.47.

There were 497 housing units, of which 6.6% were vacant. The average housing-unit density was 646.29 per square mile (249.53/km^{2}). The homeowner vacancy rate was 1.4% and the rental vacancy rate was 4.7%.

=== Income and poverty ===
The median income for a household in the village was $67,316, and the median income for a family was $76,250. Males had a median income of $41,250 versus $23,568 for females. The per capita income for the village was $23,843. About 9.4% of families and 11.1% of the population were below the poverty line, including 14.0% of those under age 18 and 16.8% of those age 65 or over.

== Education ==
It is in the North Boone Community Unit School District 200.
