= Caledonia, Illinois =

Caledonia, Illinois Caledonia Junction
- Village
- Logo

- Location of Caledonia in Boone County, Illinois.
- Coordinates: 42°22′20″N 88°53′25″W
- Country: US
- State: Illinois
- County: Boone
- Township: Caledonia
- Established: 1854
- Incorporated: 1996

Area
  - Total: 1.03 sq mi (2.68 km^{2})
  - Land: 1.03 sq mi (2.68 km^{2})
  - Water: 0 sq mi (0.00 km^{2})
- Elevation: 942 ft (287 m)

Population (2020)
  - Total: 183
  - Estimate (2024): 182 ▼
  - Density: 176.8/sq mi (68.28/km^{2})
- Time zone: UTC-6 (CST)
  - Summer (DST): UTC-5 (CDT)
- ZIP Code: 61011
- Area code: 815
- FIPS code: 17-10422
- GNIS feature ID: 2397527
- Website: www.villageofcaledonia.com

Caledonia is a village in Caledonia Township, Boone County, Illinois, United States. It is part of the Rockford, Illinois Metropolitan Statistical Area. The population was 183 at the 2020 census.

== History ==
A post office was established as Caledonia Station in 1853, one year before the settlement was established. Caledonia Station was shortened to Caledonia in 1883. Caledonia is a literary name of Scotland. Caledonia Congregational Church was founded in 1894. In 1996, Caledonia was officially incorporated as a village.

Caledonia was struck by an EF-2 tornado on November 22, 2010, around 3:04 pm; several homes were destroyed, a grain bin collapsed, the local Elementary school was set on lockdown, and six minor injuries were reported when a bus was blown over near Argyle and Harlem Roads.

== Geography ==
According to the 2021 census gazetteer files, Caledonia has a total area of 1.04 square miles (2.69 km^{2}), all land.

== Demographics ==
Historical population
Census	Pop.	Note	%±
1880	134		—
1890	184		37.3%
2000	199		—
2010	197		−1.0%
2020	183		−7.1%
U.S. Decennial Census

As of the 2020 census there were 183 people, 89 households, and 50 families residing in the village. The population density was 176.81 inhabitants per square mile (68.27/km^{2}). There were 71 housing units at an average density of 68.60 per square mile (26.49/km^{2}). The racial makeup of the village was 96.72% White, 0.55% Native American, 0.55% Asian, and 2.19% from two or more races. Hispanic or Latino of any race were 3.28% of the population.

There were 89 households, out of which 27.0% had children under the age of 18 living with them, 43.82% were married couples living together, 4.49% had a female householder with no husband present, and 43.82% were non-families. 16.85% of all households were made up of individuals, and 1.12% had someone who was 65 years of age or older living alone. The average household size was 2.72 and the average family size was 2.19.

The village's age distribution consisted of 17.9% under the age of 18, 10.3% from 18 to 24, 33.9% from 25 to 44, 32.3% from 45 to 64, and 5.6% who were 65 years of age or older. The median age was 35.6 years. For every 100 females, there were 140.7 males. For every 100 females age 18 and over, there were 113.3 males.

Barn in Caledonia

The median income for a household in the village was $73,958, and the median income for a family was $103,750. Males had a median income of $58,393 versus $25,625 for females. The per capita income for the village was $41,208. None of the families and 1.5% of the population were below the poverty line, including none of those under age 18 and none of those age 65 or over.

== Education ==
It is in the Belvidere Consolidated Unit School District 100. The only school in Caledonia is Caledonia Elementary School, after which students go to one of Belvidere's or Poplar Grove's middle schools.

== Notable person ==
- Glenn W. Birkett, Wisconsin State Assemblyman and farmer, was born in Caledonia.

== See also ==
- List of municipalities in Illinois
