= Belvidere Community Unit School District 100 =

School district in Illinois, United States

Address
- 1201 5th Avenue Belvidere, Illinois, 61008; United States

District information
- Type: Public
- Grades: PreK–12
- NCES District ID: 1705790

Students and staff
- Students: 7,539 (2020–2021)

Other information
- Website: www.district100.com

Belvidere Community Unit School District 100 (BCUSD 100) is a unified school district located in Belvidere, the county seat of Boone County, Illinois. The school district is composed of eleven schools in all, with all schools being located in or near the city limits of Belvidere, with the exception of Caledonia Elementary School in Caledonia, Illinois. There are five elementary schools (including a STEM academy), two middle schools, two high schools, and one alternative program. The current superintendent is Dr. Cassandra Schug. The district's office is at 1201, 5th Avenue in Belvidere, Illinois (61008).

The district includes all of Belvidere, Caledonia, and Garden Prairie, most of Candlewick Lake and Timberlane, and portions of Argyle, Cherry Valley, Loves Park, and Poplar Grove.

== Current Institutions ==
The district provides grades PreK-12, in the facilities listed below.

High schools

- Belvidere High School (9-12)
- Belvidere North High School (9-12)
- Everest Alternative Program (9-12)

Middle schools

- Belvidere Central Middle School (6-8)
- Belvidere South Middle School (6-8)

Elementary schools

- Caledonia Elementary School (PreK-5)
- Lincoln Elementary School (K-5)
- Meehan Elementary School (K-5)
- Seth Whitman Elementary School (K-5)
- Washington Academy (PreK-5) - STEM academy

== Former institutions ==
An elementary school located in Garden Prairie, IL, known as Kishwaukee Elmentary School, operated within the district. The school closed in October 2013.

Another elementary school located in Belvidere, known as Perry Elementary School, also operated within the district. In April 2026, the Belvidere school board voted to close Perry Elementary School in a 6-1 vote after over a century of service. The decision was made as a result of the district's declining enrollment and cost concerns. The school closed at the end of the 2025-2026 school year after over 125 years in operation.
