= North Boone Community Unit School District 200 =

School district in Illinois, United States

Address
- 6248 N Boone School Road Poplar Grove, Illinois, 61065; United States

District information
- Type: Public
- Grades: PreK–12
- NCES District ID: 1728700

Students and staff
- Students: 1,517 (2024–2025)

Other information
- Website: www.nbcusd.org

North Boone Community Unit School District 200 is a unified school district based in the central region of the county of its namesake, Boone County; more specifically, in the village of Poplar Grove, Illinois. Five of the six schools in the district are located here, with the other being eastwards in the village of Capron.

== Schools ==
The six schools comprise three elementary schools, two middle schools, and one high school.

Manchester Elementary School, which serves the grades K-4 alongside Poplar Grove Elementary School, is governed by Principal Brandon Meyer; the principal of Poplar Grove Elementary School is Heather Walsh.

Capron Elementary School, the only school in the district located in a village other than Poplar Grove, serves not only the grades K-4, but also includes a prekindergarten program. The current principal is Kelly Kerchner.

All students who graduate from one of the district elementary schools will consolidate at the fifth grade in one school, called North Boone Upper Elementary School, whose principal is Tasha Rayas; all students move on to North Boone Middle School, headed by Allison Louis, which educates those in grades seven and eight.

The last leg of education this district can provide is to those from grade nine to grade twelve; the facility is called North Boone High School, whose principal is named Marc Eckmann. The current superintendent is Dr. Michael J. Greenlee.

== Athletics ==
The mascot of the district high school, Middle school, and Upper Elementary is the Viking.

North Boone High School competes in the Big Northern Conference.

Spring sports include softball, track, baseball, basketball, cross country, and volleyball.

As of the ISAT testing scores in 2006, the averages of North Boone Community Unit School District 200, with the exception of the eleventh grade mathematics scores, paralleled or rose just above the state average.
