= Poplar Grove, Illinois =

- Village
- Icon
- Motto: A great place to call home
- Location of Poplar Grove in Boone County, Illinois.
- Coordinates: 42°22′10″N 88°50′22″W
- Country: US
- State: Illinois
- County: Boone
- Townships: Poplar Grove, Belvidere, Bonus

Government
  - Village President: Kristi Richardson

Area
  - Total: 7.67 sq mi (19.87 km^{2})
  - Land: 7.66 sq mi (19.85 km^{2})
  - Water: 0.0077 sq mi (0.02 km^{2})
- Elevation: 925 ft (282 m)

Population (2020)
  - Total: 5,049
  - Estimate (2024): 5,165 ▲
  - Density: 659/sq mi (254.4/km^{2})
- Time zone: UTC-6 (CST)
  - Summer (DST): UTC-5 (CDT)
- ZIP code: 61065
- Area codes: 815, 779
- FIPS code: 17-61145
- GNIS feature ID: 2398999
- Website: Village of Poplar Grove

Poplar Grove (founded in 1859) is a village located in Boone County, Illinois, United States. It is part of the Rockford Metropolitan Statistical Area, and of the gated community Candlewick Lake. The population was 5,049 at the 2020 census.

== History ==
Poplar Grove was named in 1845 for a grove of poplar trees near the original town site. A post office called Poplar Grove has been in operation since 1848.

=== January 2008 tornado ===
On January 7, 2008, on an unusually warm day which saw temperatures reach the mid 60s °F, a tornado struck northern Illinois, including Poplar Grove and Candlewick Lake. The tornado severely damaged a favorite local attraction, Edward's Apple Orchard. There was one serious injury reported and the damage was widespread. The tornado was later rated EF3 on the Enhanced Fujita Scale. A weather event this big had not occurred in the area since 1967. The tornado was one of the only eight rated EF3 during the time span of the warm weather, which lasted from January 7 to 10. Although there were no losses, it was still a very severe storm. The following month the cast of the television show "Storm Chasers" visited Caledonia Elementary School to talk about tornadoes and the effects they have on communities. The students and the "Storm Chasers" were featured on a Rockford's "23 WIFR News" story on the January 2008 tornado.

== Geography ==
According to the 2021 census gazetteer files, Poplar Grove has a total area of 7.67 square miles (19.87 km^{2}), of which 7.66 square miles (19.84 km^{2}) (or 99.88%) is land and 0.01 square miles (0.03 km^{2}) (or 0.12%) is water.

== Demographics ==
Historical population
Census	Pop.	Note	%±
1880	163		—
1890	232		42.3%
1900	323		39.2%
1910	297		−8.0%
1920	316		6.4%
1930	349		10.4%
1940	353		1.1%
1950	417		18.1%
1960	460		10.3%
1970	607		32.0%
1980	818		34.8%
1990	743		−9.2%
2000	1,368		84.1%
2010	5,023		267.2%
2020	5,049		0.5%
U.S. Decennial Census

=== 2020 census ===
As of the 2020 census, Poplar Grove had a population of 5,049 people, 1,709 households, and 1,310 families. The median age was 37.0 years. 29.3% of residents were under the age of 18 and 13.3% of residents were 65 years of age or older. For every 100 females there were 98.2 males, and for every 100 females age 18 and over there were 96.6 males age 18 and over. The population density was 658.11 inhabitants per square mile (254.10/km^{2}). There were 1,787 housing units at an average density of 232.92 per square mile (89.93/km^{2}).

15.1% of residents lived in urban areas, while 84.9% lived in rural areas.

Of the 1,787 housing units, 4.4% were vacant. The homeowner vacancy rate was 1.7% and the rental vacancy rate was 6.1%.

Racial composition as of the 2020 census
Race	Number	Percent
White	4,051	80.2%
Black or African American	109	2.2%
American Indian and Alaska Native	19	0.4%
Asian	41	0.8%
Native Hawaiian and Other Pacific Islander	1	0.0%
Some other race	297	5.9%
Two or more races	531	10.5%
Hispanic or Latino (of any race)	773	15.3%

=== Income and poverty ===
The median income for a household in the village was $74,896, and the median income for a family was $79,115. Males had a median income of $65,208 versus $33,750 for females. The per capita income for the village was $38,756. About 5.3% of families and 5.5% of the population were below the poverty line, including 10.0% of those under age 18 and 0.0% of those age 65 or over.

== Education ==
Most of it is in the North Boone Community Unit School District 200 while a portion is in the Belvidere Consolidated Unit School District 100.

== Notable person ==
- Rob Sherman (c. 1953 – December 9, 2016), atheist activist and perennial candidate

== See also ==
- Poplar Grove Airport
