= List of round barns =

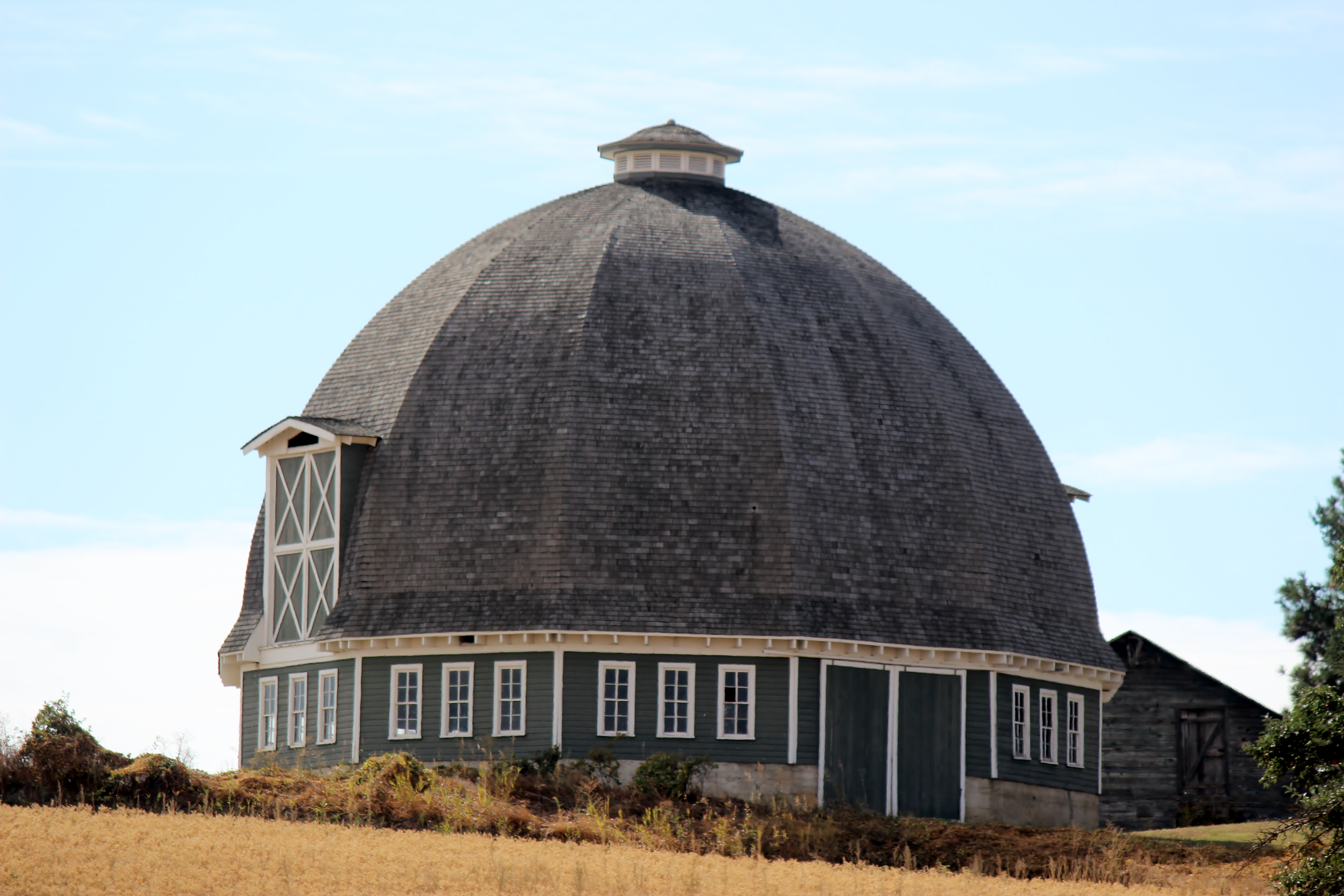
1917-built Leonard Barn in Washington state

What are termed round barns include historic barns having true circular designs and also octagonal or other polygonal designs that approximate a circle. In the United States, in a first era of round barn construction, from 1850 to 1900, numerous octagonal barns were built. In a second era, from 1889 to 1936, numerous true circular barns were built.

This list article includes surviving or historic round barns in Canada, the United States, and elsewhere. There were 19 historic round and polygonal barns in Canada identified as surviving in the 1970s, in a list compiled by members of a club and typed up by Katherine Kirkam. According to Matthew Farfan, nine round barns survive in the Eastern Townships of the province of Quebec, all close to the U.S. border. (Note: This list confirms existence of 15 round or polygonal barns in Canada (8 of them in Quebec near the U.S. border) from Google and Bing satellite view, as of the satellite photos presented in Google and Bing in March 2016.)

Besides paying attention to Canadian barns, Kirkham also studied American barns; in the 1970s, she identified 444 surviving barns in the United States. Many of them are listed on the National Register of Historic Places.

Dale J. Travis has identified and photographed (or collected photos of) round barns and other round or polygonal buildings throughout the United States and Canada. His webpages document the loss of numerous historic round barns.

The periods during which round barns were built varies across U.S. states. Most of Indiana's round barns were built between 1900 and 1920, and their construction peaked in 1910. Iowa's peak years were from 1909 to 1922. All 44 of the historic round barns built in South Dakota were built between 1903 and 1946. North Dakota's peak years were from 1910 to 1916. South Dakota had none built before 1900 because the state had yet to be developed.

== Canada ==
As documented here, there are at least 11 surviving octagonal, true round, and other round-type barns in Quebec. A few others survive in British Columbia, Alberta and Ontario. A list of round or near-round structures in Quebec, including historic round barns, developed by Dale J. Travis has informed this compilation. (Note: One barn in Quebec on Chemin Tetreault noted by Travis as possibly gone, is not now found on Google maps satellite view.) Similar for other provinces at Travis site. Travis also includes less historic structures.

This includes others not in Travis's compilation, such as the Higginson Round Barn, which is an impressive and old one.

Following is incomplete, but is intended to become a complete list, from West to East:

Building	Image	Datesfosg	Location	City, Province	Description
Fintry Estate barn		1925	Fintry Provincial Park and Protected Area, 7655 Fintry Delta Rd.50.1371°N 119.5036°W	Fintry, Okanagan Country, British Columbia	
Henderson Round Barn		Built 1898, moved 1972	Fort Edmonton Park; 53.5004°N 113.5809°W	Edmonton, Alberta	Preserved in a historical park.
Sowerby Barn		1928	131 Brownlee Rd (at Round Barn Rd)46.28248°N 83.43273°W	Huron Shores, Ontario	One of three 12-sided barns still existing in Canada
Cordukes/Weber Barn		1919	1410 Basswood Lakes Road46.29841°N 83.38881°W	Algoma, Ontario	12-sided barn, site of farmers market, has been dismantled, moved and rebuilt adjacent to Sowerby Hall (formerly the Day and Bright Community and Recreation Centre) at 1410 Basswood Lake Road, near Hendry Street.
Octagon barn south of Osgoode			5672 Dalmeny Road45.11813°N 75.58509°W	Osgoode, Ontario	
Higginson Round Barn		1893–94	2500 Highway 34; 45.580283°N 74.622895°W	Hawkesbury, Ontario	Several sources, hidden.
Walbridge Barn		1882	Chemin de Mystic; 45.15262°N 72.98823°W	Mystic, Quebec	Oldest surviving polygonal barn in Canada. Also known as Grange Alexander-Solomon-Walbridge, it has a unique roof, became Quebec historic site in 2004 and became a museum in 2011
Round barn at West Brome			Chemin Scott45.17290°N 72.67410°W	West Brome, Quebec	
Grange Ronde de Mansonville			Rue Joseph Blanchet; 45.0531°N 72.3937°W	Mansonville, Quebec	True round barn
Round barn at Saint-Benoit-du-Lac			Chemin Fisher; 45.15834°N 72.27020°W	Saint-Benoit-du-Lac, Quebec	A round barn and a round hay tower
Grange ronde Stanley-Holmes		1907	Chemin Holmes; 45.120551°N 71.974350°W	Barnston-Ouest	Rbcq: "W. of Barnston. Hwy.141 W. from Barnston to Chemin Caron Rd., S. on Chemin Caron Rd. & SE on Chemin de Way's Mill & the barn would be on the right hand (S.) side of the road. Holmhurst Farm, true round barn, red horizontal siding, 2 pitch conical roof, louvered cupola." This is Stanley-Holmes Round Barn, on Holmhurst Farm.
Round barn south of Barnston		1909	Chemin de Baldwin Mills Barnston; 45.1008°N 71.8885°W	South of Barnston, Coaticook, Quebec	True round barn with two-pitch conical roof with a cupola, at Ferme Blayrond
Round barn at Barnston		1901	Chemin Riendeau; 45.106620°N 71.878271°W	Barnston, Coaticook, Quebec	In Barnston. True round barn with two-pitch conical roof, with cupola
Grange Ronde		built 1995	400 Rue St. Marc., Gorge de Coaticook Park45.14477°N 71.79761°W	Coaticook, Quebec	
Round barn west of Beaumont		Pre-1850	Route du Fleuve (Route 132); 46.829175°N 71.040144°W	Beaumont, Quebec	White barn
Adolph Gagnon Museum		1888	48.297637°N 68.865842°W	Saint-Fabien, Quebec	Museum now in former barn
Octagonal barn west of Cap Chatte			Rue Notre Dame Ouest (2.5 miles west of Cap-Chat)49.08668°N 66.73190°W	Cap-Chat, Quebec	Octagonal barn west of Cap Chatte
Round barn near Dunham				Dunham, Quebec	
Holmes' Barn		c. 1907		Ways Mills, Quebec	
Second of two round barns near Ways Mills				Ways Mills, Quebec	

== United States ==
=== West: California, Oregon, Washington, New Mexico, Colorado ===
Building	Image	Dates	Location	City, State	Description
Barn north of American Canyon			S. Napa Junction Rd; 38.17868°N 122.24803°W	American Canyon, Napa Valley, California	20-sided, 100 feet (30 m) barn
San Luis Obispo Octagon Barn		built pre-1900, restored 2009	Octagon Way, off Higuera St. 35.23687°N 120.67959°W	San Luis Obispo, California	Octagonal barn, 77 feet (23 m) by 80 feet (24 m)
Knight Barn		built 1894–96	2955(?) Copenhagen Road; 40.677882°N 124.25336°W	Loleta, California	16-sided barn, shown standing in photos by Mary Louise Lorensen. Shows collapsed in center in Google 2016 satellite imagery.
Fountaingrove Round Barn			Fountaingrove Parkway at Round Barn Blvd; 38.475767°N 122.72746°W	Fountaingrove, Santa Rosa, California	16-sided, destroyed during the Tubbs Fire of 2017.
De Turk Round Barn		built 1891; NRHP 2004	819 Donahue St. 38°26′28″N 122°43′26″W	Santa Rosa, California	
R. L. Johnston Round Barn (also called Beaver Creek Ranch Barn)		18-sided barn built in 1916; last remains dismantled 2007; rebuilt 2009	Fort Crook Ave; 41.001843°N 121.446295°W	Fall River Mills, California	Built "...to break and train wild horses for the U. S. Army." Reconstructed on grounds of Fort Crook Museum.
Mount Weske Stables		Octagonal structure built in 1870s or 1880s.	1520 Mount Weske Drive; 38.567919°N 122.794434°W	Windsor, California	Houses racehorses.
Pete French Round Barn		Built c. 1875–1885	43°07′57″N 118°38′33″W	Burns, Oregon	Cattle rancher Peter French (1849–1897) broke and trained horses there in winter.
Lake County Round Sale Barn		1942 built 2003 NRHP-listed	3531 S. 6th Street; 42.195342°N 120.361078°W	Lakeview, Oregon	
Laughlin Round Barn		built 1883; NRHP 1986	46°20′25″N 122°55′24″W	Castle Rock, Washington	
Coffman Barn		built c.1902	647 NW St. Helens; 46°39′49.4″N 122°58′34.8″W	Chehalis, Washington	Located in the NRHP-listed Pennsylvania Avenue-West Side Historic District, the three-story round barn is 40 feet (12.2 m) in diameter and 45 feet (13.7 m) tall. Constructed for use as a dairy barn, stable, and garage. The structure is the only round barn residing in an NRHP-listed district in Washington state.
Ojo Caliente Hot Springs Round Barn		1924 built 2003 NRHP-listed	36°18′37″N 106°2′48″W	Ojo Caliente, New Mexico	Only round barn in New Mexico and the only adobe round barn in the U.S.
DeLaney Barn		built 1902; NRHP 1989	200 S. Chambers Rd. 39°42′48″N 104°48′27″W	Aurora, Colorado	Only surviving round barn in Colorado. Built in 1902 as a silo. Converted into a dairy barn by 1910.
T. A. Leonard Barn		built 1917; NRHP 1986	S. side of Old Moscow Highway, near Pullman, Washington; 46.704444°N 117.123056°W	Whitman County, Washington	Very tall. Considered endangered before “saved” in 1992.
Cornell Farmstead barn		NRHP 1987	Pleasant Rd. and Old Prosser Rd., in or near Grandview; 46.243056°N 119.894722°W	Yakima County, Washington	

=== Central ===
==== Illinois ====
See Round Barns in Illinois Thematic Resources for a discussion of current and former round barns in the state.

Building	Image	Dates	Location	City, State	Description
University of Illinois round barns		1907–1913	40°5′40″N 88°13′22″W	Urbana, Illinois	Important leading examples.
Wheeler-Magnus Round Barn		c. 1910	42°5′42″N 87°58′51″W	Arlington Heights, Illinois	Only round barn surviving in Cook County.
Clarence Kleinkopf Round Barn		built 1915	40°25′31″N 90°47′32″W	Colchester, Illinois	One of 3 round barns in area built by carpenter Dick Carmack
Robert Weber Round Barn		1917	42°24′43″N 89°14′11″W	Durand, Illinois	
Dennis Otte Round Barn		1930	42°19′59″N 89°44′58″W	Eleroy, Illinois	
Gerald Harbach Round Barn		built c.1914 NRHP 1984	42°19′41″N 89°45′12″W	Eleroy, Illinois	A 55-foot (16.8-m) diameter barn upon a poured concrete foundation. Its wood sided exterior has been covered in asphalt since the building's construction.
James Bruce Round Barn		built 1914; NRHP 1984	42°15′6″N 89°38′55″W	Freeport, Illinois	Constructed by Jeremiah Shaffer and the Haas Brothers, who built at least 12 round barns in the area. Features a single hip roof design probably influenced by the Agricultural Experiment Stations at the University of Illinois and the University of Wisconsin–Madison.
Ryan Round Barn		built 1910; NRHP 1974	41°14′28″N 89°55′32″W	Kewanee, Illinois	
Chris Jensen Round Barn			42°23′30″N 89°50′6″W	Lena, Illinois	
Lewis Round Barn		1914	40°5′18″N 91°17′4″W	Mendon, Illinois	
Robert Buckles Barn		Built 1917; Added to the NRHP in 1983	39°59′8″N 89°16′25″W	Mount Pulaski, Illinois	Vitrified tile exterior
Charles Fehr Round Barn		built 1912; NRHP 1984	42°29′34″N 89°31′20″W	Orangeville, Illinois	Interesting for its hipped roof
Raymond Schultz Round Barn			40°51′43″N 88°39′9″W	Pontiac, Illinois	
Ron George Round Barn		NRHP 1982	41°38′26″N 88°6′10″W	Romeoville, Illinois	$1,500 building that with a diameter of 60 foot (18 m). Served nine horse stalls and may have served cows as well. Its wooden cupola is raised sixty feet above a concrete foundation.
Virginia Tillery Round Barn		1912	39°26′26″N 90°26′37″W	Whitehall, Illinois	

==== Indiana ====
Building	Image	Dates	Location	City, State	Description
The Barns at Nappanee			41.443606°N 86.019718°W	Nappanee	Operating as ‘’’Round Barn Theatre’’’.
Ben Colter Polygonal Barn			40.798071°N 84.840765°W	Adams County	
Cornish Griffin Round Barn			41.612558°N 85.035280°W	Pleasant Lake, Indiana	
Crown Point Round Barn			41.369828°N 87.318462°W	Crown Point, Indiana	1410 E 137th Ave, Crown Point
Duvall Round Barn		built: 1914. New Roof: 1972	40.895659°N 86.74383°W	Buffalo, Indiana	
John Haimbaugh Round Barn		Built 1914,	41.112874°N 86.186373°W	Rochester, Indiana	
George Hall Round Barn		built 1912	38.854250°N 86.137067°W	Medora, Indiana	
Hileman Round Barn			40.989315°N 85.927712°W	Silver Lake, Indiana	
Martin Hofherr Round Barn		Built: 1904 (demolished)	40.194702°N 85.507258°W	York, Indiana	
Jasper Hufty Farm Round Barn			40.588373°N 86.756993°W	Delphi, Indiana	
Tom Jones Round Barn		Built: 1907	40.957083°N 86.467630°W	Kewanna, Indiana	
Bert Leedy Round Barn			41.108822°N 86.240846°W	Rochester, Indiana	
Frank Littleton Round Barn		built 1903; NRHP 1993	39.872850°N 85.890100°W	Mount Comfort, Indiana	
Thomas Ranck Round Barn		b. c.1885–1910 NRHP 1983	39°42′50″N 85°2′40″W	Brownsville, Indiana	70 feet diameter, 70 feet tall barn featuring two rows of clerestories; stands out as one of the most elaborately designed structures in eastern Indiana.
Marion Ridgeway Polygonal Barn		built 1878, restored 2001	41.590000°N 86.702500°W	LaPorte, Indiana	
Everett Rouch Round Barn			41.486610°N 86.232990°W	Bremen, Indiana	
Round barn in Muncie			40.13197°N 85.32786°W	Muncie, Indiana	Identified as "The Round Barn" in Google maps. Verified as round barn by street view.
Rebecca Rankin Round Barn				Poling, Indiana	
Quivey Round Barn		Built 1913–14	41.251128°N 86.338028°W	Argos, Indiana	This is a 12 sided barn, red vertical siding, cupola, 3-pitch sectional roof.
Frank Senour Round Barn				Blackhawk, Indiana	
Strauther Pleak Round Barn				Greensburg, Indiana	
Don Smiley Round Barn		Built 1914	41.063389°N 86.236505°W	Rochester, Indiana	
Utter-Gerig Round Barn				Akron, Indiana	
Andrew B. VanHuys Round Barn				Lebanon, Indiana	
Menno Yoder Round Barn		Built in 1908	41.675860°N 85.594742°W	Lodi, Indiana	
W. H. York Round Barn				Lodi, Indiana	
Weller-Calloway Round Barn		Built 1914,	40.950433°N 86.165483°W	Rochester, Indiana	
Watson Round Barn, or Oliver Perry Watson Round Barn		1907–08	40.741927°N 85.594800°W	Mt. Etna, IN	
Wideman-Gerig Round Barn– Round Barn Golf Club			41.064214°N 86.201705°W	Rochester	
E. O. White/ Hazelwood Round Barn		1916		Dana, Vermillion County, Indiana	The center silo is seventy-two feet tall and the barn is sixty foot in diameter.

==== Iowa ====
Building	Image	Dates	Location	City, State	Description
Nelson Round Barn		built 1912; NRHP 1986	County Road J46; 40°42′24″N 93°20′44″W	Allerton, Iowa	
George Darrow Round Barn		built 1916; NRHP 1986	County Road T76; 43°9′52″N 92°29′46″W	Alta Vista, Iowa	
Thomsen Round Barn		built 1912; NRHP 1986	Off Iowa Highway 15; 43°20′46″N 94°29′52″W	Armstrong, Iowa	
Lenox Round Barn		built 1905; NRHP 1999	1001 Pollock Blvd. 40°40′39″N 94°43′45″W	Bedford, Iowa	
William Oakland Round Barn		built 1910; NRHP 1986	Off U.S. Route 69; 42°29′11″N 93°38′0″W	Blairsburg, Iowa	
Nebergall "Knoll Crest" Round Barn		built 1914; NRHP 1986	Telegraph Road; 41°30′59″N 90°42′54″W	Blue Grass, Iowa	built by Benton Steele
Round Barn, Buckingham Township		built 1920; NRHP 1986	Off U.S. Route 63; 42°17′1″N 92°28′35″W	Buckingham, Iowa	
Wickfield Round Barn		built 1919; NRHP 1986	Off Iowa Highway 2; 40°40′4″N 92°1′23″W	Cantril, Iowa	It has 12 dormers.
C. A. Rownd Round Barn		built 1911; NRHP 1986	5102 S. Main St. 42°29′50″N 92°27′47″W	Cedar Falls, Iowa	
Brooks Round Barn		built 1914; NRHP 1986	West of U.S. Route 218; 42°57′0″N 92°35′4″W	Charles City, Iowa	destroyed in 1995
Spotts Round Barn		built 1914; NRHP 1986	Iowa Highway 14; 42°56′10″N 91°45′1″W	Charles City, Iowa	
Robert Kirkpatrick Round Barn		built 1919; NRHP 2005	3342–120th Ave. 42°17′55″N 91°33′29″W	Coggon, Iowa	
Plagmann Round Barn		built 1912; NRHP 1986	County Road V66; 41°43′30″N 92°3′24″W	Conroy, Iowa	
Waveland Round Barn		built 1900; NRHP 1986	Off U.S. Route 20; 42°29′46″N 95°42′9″W	Cushing, Iowa	
Charles B. Reynolds Round Barn		built 1924; NRHP 1999	2382 Harrison Ave. 43°18′10″N 96°9′21″W	Doon, Iowa	
Round Barn, Dubuque Township		built 1915; NRHP 1986	2810 Cascade Rd. 42°28′24″N 90°42′27″W	Dubuque, Iowa	
James Greer McQuilkin Round Barn		built 1918; NRHP 1986	County Road D56; 42°15′51″N 91°47′43″W	Eagle Center, Iowa	
Round Barn, Bruce Township Section 3		built 1910; NRHP 1986	Off U.S. Route 218; 42°17′31″N 92°14′8″W	Eagle Center, Iowa	
Seymour Ross Round Barn		built 1914; NRHP 1986	Off Iowa Highway 374	Gillett Grove, Iowa	
Frantz Round Barn		built 1911; NRHP 1986	Off U.S. Route 30; 42°2′19″N 94°12′4″W	Grand Junction, Iowa	
Erza McKenzie Round Barn		built 1922; NRHP 1986	Off Iowa Highway 150; 42°36′26″N 91°56′7″W	Hazleton, Iowa	
Octagon Round Barn, Indian Creek Township		built 1880; NRHP 1986	Off County Road S14; 41°57′0″N 93°27′6″W	Iowa Center, Iowa	
Herman Wood Round Barn		built 1916; NRHP 1986	U.S. Route 65; 42°33′28″N 93°15′2″W	Iowa Falls, Iowa	
Slayton Farms-Round Barn		built 1915; NRHP 1999	20478 135th St. 42°30′52″N 93°17′26″W	Iowa Falls, Iowa	
Round Barn, Washington Township		built 1917; NRHP 1986	Off U.S. Route 218; 42°35′7″N 92°27′40″W	Janesville, Iowa	
Round Barn, Bruce Township Section 6		built 1914; NRHP 1986	West of U.S. Route 218; 42°17′13″N 92°16′50″W	La Porte, Iowa	
Tonsfeldt Round Barn		built 1918; NRHP 1986	Plymouth County Fairgrounds; 42°47′52″N 96°9′34″W	Le Mars, Iowa	
Fred W. Meier Round Barn		built 1912; NRHP 1986	Off Iowa Highway 9; 43°14′3″N 91°28′34″W	Ludlow, Iowa	Former true round barn measuring 56 feet (17 m) around. Featured stone and featured red horizontal siding, 2-pitch conical roof, aerator and an internal wood stave silo. Destroyed in a thunderstorm during night of July 27, 2002.
Round Barn, Cooper Township		built 1921; NRHP 1986	Iowa Highway 141; 42°7′59″N 95°44′14″W	Mapleton, Iowa	
Round Barn, Millville Township		built 1916; NRHP 1986	U.S. Route 52; 42°42′56″N 91°5′4″W	Millville, Iowa	
Holtkamp Round Barn		built 1918; NRHP 1986	Off U.S. Route 218; 40°49′16″N 91°33′23″W	Salem, Iowa	
Round Barn, Norway Township		built 1920; NRHP 1987	Off County Road R60; 43°29′22″N 93°35′18″W	Scarville, Iowa	
Round Barn, Washington Township		built 1917; NRHP 1986	U.S. Route 71; 41°3′39″N 94°59′1″W	Sciola, Iowa	
Miller Round Barn		built 1918; NRHP 1986	County Road F62; 41°33′38″N 91°37′52″W	Sharon Center, Iowa	
Eckle Round Barn		built 1928; NRHP 1986	Off Iowa Highway 168; 41°3′39″N 94°59′1″W	Shelby, Iowa	
Dobbin Round Barn		built 1919; NRHP 1986	Off County Road S52; 41°59′6″N 93°11′58″W	State Center, Iowa	
Round Barn, Pilot Grove Township		built 1912; NRHP 1986	County Road H20; 41°6′21″N 95°4′50″W	Stennett, Iowa	
John W. Young Round Barn		built 1917; NRHP 1986	Off U.S. Route 63; 42°11′36″N 92°28′28″W	Traer, Iowa	
Clark Round Barn		built 1908; NRHP 1986	County Road T7H; 40°58′46″N 92°52′50″W	Tyrone, Iowa	

==== Kentucky ====
Building	Image	Dates	Location	City, State	Description
Bird Octagonal Mule Barn		built c.1880 NRHP 1988	Cropper Rd. (Kentucky Route 43), Shelby County, Kentucky, about 3 miles (4.8 km) south of Cropper, Kentucky38°17′16″N 85°07′38″W	Shelby County, Kentucky	Only recorded octagonal barn and one of few mule barns to be identified in Shelby County."

==== North Dakota ====
Building	Image	Dates	Location	City, State	Description
Robert Abell Round Barn		built 1942; NRHP 1986	46°22′35″N 99°28′29″W	Burnstad, North Dakota	It cost $800 to build.
Urbain Cote Round Barn		built 1943; 1986	47°38′40″N 100°3′30″W	Dunseith, North Dakota	Its hay loft floor "was used by roller skaters during the 1950s and shows little wear or sagging."
Rodman Octagonal Barn		built 1890; NRHP 1986	46°24′33″N 98°47′17″W	Near Edgeley, North Dakota	
Gerhardt Octagonal Pig House		built 1930; NRHP 1986	46°52′28″N 102°29′37″W	Near Gladstone, North Dakota	An octagonal pig-house deemed to meet the NRHP multiple property criteria for North Dakota round barns
Carlott Funseth Round Barn		built 1909; NRHP 1986	47°46′46″N 97°35′56″W	Kempton, North Dakota	Built by Sven and Ole Olson to replace a previous, octagonal barn
Cecil Baker Round Barn		built 1921; NRHP 1986	47°15′13″N 98°52′47″W	Kensal, North Dakota	Apparently a kit barn, purchased from the Gordon Vantine Company of Davenport, Iowa.
Sylvanus Marriage Octagonal Barn		built 1902; NRHP 1986	47°36′50″N 99°5′50″W	Near New Rockford, North Dakota	Octagonal barn
Jens Myhre Round Barn		built 1919; NRHP 1986	47°44′46″N 99°12′11″W	New Rockford, North Dakota	Only surviving North Dakota round barn with a ramp to its mow area, hence "may have been perceived as out of fashion and behind the times."
Niels Nielsen Fourteen-Side Barn Farm		built 1914; NRHP 1986	48°49′54″N 102°57′33″W	Near Noonan, North Dakota	Pre-cut kit barn from a firm in Chicago
Levi Glick Round Barn		built 1923; NRHP 1986	48°13′29″N 101°10′20″W	Surrey, North Dakota	

==== Ohio ====
Building	Image	Dates	Location	City, State	Description
Round Barn (Columbus Grove, Ohio)		Built 1910; NRHP 1980		Columbus Grove, Ohio	
Round Barn (Lima, Ohio)		Built 1911; NRHP 1980		Lima, Ohio	
Round Barn (New Hampshire, Ohio)		Built 1877; NRHP 1980		New Hampshire, Ohio	Largest round barn east of the Mississippi River. Also known as J.H. Manchester Round Barn
Round Barn (Paulding, Ohio)		Built 1911; NRHP 1980		Paulding, Ohio	
Round Barn (Van Wert, Ohio)		Built 1910; NRHP 1980		Van Wert, Ohio	Also known as Clayton Hoover Round Barn
Round Barn (Springfield, Ohio)	No image available	Circa 1900		Springfield, Ohio	Octagonal barn along Fairfield Pike southwest of Springfield

==== South Dakota ====
Building	Image	Dates	Location	City, State	Description
Pettigrew Barns		built 1901; NRHP 2004	44°02′41″N 96°35′26″W	Flandreau, South Dakota	Octagonal barn built before 1903 date which has been cited as earliest round or polygonal barns in South Dakota
Freier Round Barn				Draper, South Dakota	
Shafer Round Barn		built 1920; NRHP 1995	43°32′31″N 96°38′58″W	Sioux Falls, South Dakota	
Stark Round Barn		built 1921; NRHP 2001	43°48′14″N 97°27′4″W	Near Unityville, South Dakota	
Corson Emminger Round Barn		built 1909–10; NRHP 1978	44.86128°N 97.10946°W	Watertown, South Dakota	
J. Whitney Goff Round Barn				Winfred, South Dakota	

==== Wisconsin ====
Building	Image	Dates	Location	City, State	Description
Dougan Round Barn		built 1911<annbr>NRHP 1979	42°30′29″N 88°59′20″W	Beloit, Wisconsin	Served a dairy farm of 120 cows. The barn was demolished in 2012.
George Apfel Round Barn		built 1914; NRHP 1979	43°39′15″N 90°41′24″W	Clinton, Wisconsin	Octagonal in shape.
Annala Round Barn		built 1921; NRHP 1979	46°25′5″N 90°9′41″W	Hurley, Wisconsin	
Central Wisconsin State Fair Round Barn		built 1916; NRHP 1979	Jct. of Vine Ave. and E. 17th St. 44°39′8″N 90°10′27″W	Marshfield, Wisconsin	The world's largest round barn
Dean-Armstrong-Englund Octagonal Barn		built 1893; NRHP-delisted 1984		Near Milton, Wisconsin	It had a windmill.
Gempeler Round Barn		built 1912; NRHP 1979	42°39′50″N 89°19′50″W	Near Orfordville, Wisconsin	68 foot diameter barn, "significant for its ingenious construction, with its main story supported by an inverse pylon made up of an oak trunk upside down in the center of the basement"
Nashold 20-sided Barn		built 1911; NRHP 1988	43°25′44″N 89°5′15″W	Near Fall River, Wisconsin	
Risum Round Barn		built 1892; NRHP 1979	42°35′55″N 89°17′35″W	Orfordville, Wisconsin	Built early, in 1890–92, for a Norwegian immigrant; a 60-foot diameter barn.
Barn near Mauston				Lindina, Wisconsin	

==== Kansas, Minnesota, Montana, Nebraska, Oklahoma ====
Numerous round and octagon barns in Kansas, including some already- or since-destroyed ones, are covered in a 1999 Kansas State Historical Society study. Round barns in Kansas and these other states include:

Building	Image	Dates	Location	City, State	Description
Raymond Brinkman barn		Built 1912	38°46′04″N 94°38′48″W	Stillwell, Kansas	Built to house percherons. 48-foot diameter, 33 feet tall.
Thompson-Wohlschlegel Round Barn		Built 1912; NRHP 1985	37°16′33″N 97°58′4″W	Harper, Kansas	
Fromme-Birney Round Barn				Mullinville, Kansas	
Dammon Round Barn		built 1914; NRHP 1980		Red Wing, Minnesota	60 Ft high and 55 ft. in diameter. Has open center in upper floor where silo was originally. Now serves as a MN Wedding Venue. More updated pictures at www.roundbarnfarm.com
Cota Round Barns		built 1921; NRHP 1982	45°34′46″N 93°56′50″W	St. Cloud, Minnesota	
Moody Barn		built 1915; NRHP 1980	45°18′7″N 92°52′14″W	Chisago County, Minnesota	
Sparre Barn		Built 1917–24; NRHP 1980	45°20′4.8″N 93°28′9.4″W	Anoka County, Minnesota	
Doncaster Round Barn		Built 1882; NRHP 2015	45°34′12″N 112°18′49″W	Twin Bridges, Montana	Birthplace of 1889 Kentucky Derby winner Spokane, NRHP-listed
Kent Dairy Round Barn		Built 1941; NRHP 1995	45°13′09″N 109°14′29″W	Red Lodge, Montana	
Couser Barn		built 1912–13; NRHP 1986		Near Laurel, Nebraska	Dodecagon-shaped, balloon-framed.
Starke Round Barn		Built 1902; NRHP 1972	40°5′8.6″N 98°26′12.2″W	Red Cloud, Nebraska	
Ehlers Round Barn		built 1922–4; NRHP 1995	40°41′32″N 96°34′20″W	Roca, Nebraska	Innovative and efficient design; severely damaged by a snowstorm on 4 February 2012, purportedly "beyond repair."
Arcadia Round Barn		Built 1898; NRHP 1977	107 Highway 66; 35°39′44″N 97°19′33″W	Arcadia, Oklahoma	Famous Route 66 landmark, 60 feet in diameter, built by William "Big Bill" Odor, "subject of a massive, and award-winning, volunteer restoration effort in 1988 when the original roof collapsed"
Hines Round Barn		Built 1913; NRHP 1984	35°26′55″N 94°47′17″W	Sallisaw, Oklahoma	
Frank Uehling Barn		1918 built 1985 NRHP-listed	41°44′16″N 96°30′04″W	Uehling, Nebraska	

=== Mid-Atlantic ===
==== Delaware and Pennsylvania ====
Building	Image	Dates	Location	City, State	Description
Cherbourg Round Barn		built 1918; NRHP 1978	39°9′4″N 75°27′27″W	Little Creek, Delaware	
Neff Round Barn		built c.1910 NRHP 1979	Off of Pennsylvania Route 45, Potter Township; 40°49′3″N 77°42′6″W	south of Centre Hall, Pennsylvania	
Noah Sheely Round Barn		built 1914		About 8 miles (13 km) west of Gettysburg, Pennsylvania.	In use as a fruit market and for events.

==== New York ====
Building	Image	Dates	Location	City, State	'Description’
McArthur-Martin Hexadecagon Barn		1883 built, NRHP-listed 1984		Bloomville in Delaware County, New York	16-sided, 100 feet in diameter
Bates Round Barn		1928–31	NY 12; 42.302852°N 75.801491°W	Greene, Chenango County, New York	
Young Round Barn		1914–16	NY 12, about 3 miles south of Greene; 42.29431°N 75.80739°W	Greene, Chenango County, New York	
Kelly Round Barn		1893		Halcottsville, Delaware County, New York	Travis-omitted?
Zoller-Frasier Round Barn		c.1895		Newville, Herkimer County, New York	Travis-omitted?
Bronck Farm 13-Sided Barn			Peter Bronck Rd. (County Highway 42); 42.346253°N 73.844812°W	Coxsackie, Greene County, New York	13-sided barn at Bronck Museum
Lunn-Musser Octagon Barn		1885	NY 51; 42.587491°N 75.196781°W	New Lisbon, Otsego County, New York	
Parker 13-Sided Barn		1896	NY 10; 42.481327°N 74.604654°W	Jefferson, Schoharie County, New York	(Travis identifies this as 12-sided and would name it "Donald Martin barn"?)
Unnamed barn on Daniels Road			3339 Daniels Rd. 43.253691°N 78.847026°W	Wilson, Niagara County, New York	
Baker Octagon Barn		1882	NY 28 at Walters Way; 42.82385°N 75.014876°W	Ritchfield, Otsego County, New York	

==== NY notes ====
Gamel hexadecagon barn 16-sided Gamel barn in North Collins, New York

Schultz 15-sided barn (1918–1929) at Cohecton not listed due to DOE owner objection

"Nine octagonal barns, most built in the 1870s and 1880s, have been noted in New York, and undoubtedly many more have never been recorded. Extant examples in the nominated group include the Baker octagon barn near Richfield Springs (1882), the Lunn-Musser octagon barn in New Lisbon (1885), and the Lattin-Crandall octagon barn in Catharine (1893)."

McArthur-Martin barn in Kortright (1883) 16-sided

Parker 13-sided barn (1896) about 15 miles north of Kortright in Jefterson

"Roof types among the nominated examples include conical (for example the Schultz 15-sided barn at Cochecton, New York (1918), gambrel. (the Young round barn at Greene-1914), and domical (Bates barn at Greene)."

11 of 12 listed, p21

=== New England ===
==== Massachusetts, New Hampshire ====
Building	Image	Dates	Location	City, State	hidden---->
Round barn at Hancock Shaker Village		1826, expanded 1870s		Hancock, Massachusetts	
Round barn on NH-10			430 NH-1044.01000°N 72.06938°W	Piermont, New Hampshire	There is "Round Barn Shoppe" identified on Google maps.

==== Vermont ====
Building	Image	Dates	Location	City, State	Description
Ralph Joslin barn		1910	E. Warren Rd44.16805°N 72.81127°W	Waitsfield, Vermont	12-sided barn built 1910, restored 1990, at Green Mountain Cultural Center Farm had been in one family seven generations. An "Inn at the Round Barn Farm" is there.
Robinson Brothers barn		1910,16(?)	Robinson Road43.837057°N 72.434026°W	Strafford Township, Orange County, Vermont	10-sided barn
Russell Moore barn Shelburne Museum		1899	U.S. 544.342831°N 72.042986°W	St. Johnsbury, Vermont	Russell Moore barn, moved 1985–86 partly by helicopter and serves as orientation center of the Shelburne Museum.
Butson barn		1903	Round Barn Road44.12845°N 72.04301°W	Wells River, Vermont	
Field barn		1912	Satterly Rd44.19216°N 73.24187°W	Ferrisburgh, Vermont	
Welch barn		1916	Elmore Rd.44.553764°N 72.550159°W	Morristown, Vermont	20-sided barn, 75'x40'
Southwick or Haberman barn		1911		Calais, Vermont	
Round Barn Apartments		1902	Faywood Rd.44.743458°N 73.277593°W	Grand Isle, Vermont	Round barn converted into apartments.
12-sided barn			2604 E. Hill Rd.43.313042°N 72.700543°W	Andover, Vermont	12-sided barn
West View Farm		1903	Hastings Road (Waterbury Highway 34)44.403376°N 71.992921°W	Waterford, Vermont	Three-level 80 feet (24 m) diameter barn which was immediately a tourist attraction.

=== South: Georgia, Missouri, West Virginia and Virginia ===
Building	Image	Dates	Location	City, State	Description
Orrie J. Smith Round Barn			40°13′32″N 92°33′33″W	Kirksville, Missouri	In Orie J. Smith Black and White Stock Farm Historic District, NRHP-listed
Rea Octagonal Barn				Rea, Missouri	Vertical white siding, windowed clerestory, used for cattle and in good condition (in August 2019?). Another photo
Round barn near Bosworth			On route 211 just north of county route M, somewhat northwest of Bosworth, Missouri; 39.488106°N 93.384454°W	Ridge Township, Carroll County, Missouri	Historic, true round barn, white.
Round barn in Belton			Behind house at 1101 Main St., Belton, Missouri; 38.807151°N 94.525467°W	Belton, Missouri	Historic, true round barn, unpainted.
Round barn near Ravenswood			240th St., 40.374239°N 93.384454°W	Jackson Township, Nodaway County, Missouri	Historic barn with new roof in 2012.
12-sided barn near Taberville			NW State Route H, near Taberville; 38.037712°N 93.997117°W	Taber Township, St. Clair County, Missouri	Historic 12-sided barn, red.
Dorough Round Barn and Farm		built 1917; NRHP 1980	33.701235°N 84.968505°W	Hickory Level, Georgia	14-sided, now in complete disrepair
8 Sided Barn in Laurens County		Built 1910s	1547 GA-31 East Dublin, Georgia 31027	East Dublin, VA	8 Sided Barn on private property. Source https://vanishinggeorgia.com/2017/11/30/round-barn-laurens-county/
Blankenship Farm 14-sided barn		1929 built NRHP 1989	0.4 miles (0.64 km) south of the junction of VA 733 and 37°11′3″N 80°21′53″W	Ellett, Virginia	14-sided
Round barn in New Market			13789 N. Valley Pike38.60131°N 78.71582°W	New Market, Virginia	Identified as "The Round Barn" already in Google maps.
Washington's 16-sided barn		built 1793		Mount Vernon, Virginia	Reproduction(?) of barn at Mount Vernon "invented" by George Washington, where wheat was trodden.
Hoffman Round Barn		built 1913; NRHP 2009	38°20′55″N 78°19′53″W	Wolftown, Virginia	
Hamilton Round Barn		built 1911; NRHP 1985	39°30′59.04″N 80°20′15.72″W	Mannington, West Virginia	

== South America ==
Building	Image	Dates	Location	City, State	Description
Museo Colonial Alemán or Frutillar German Colonial Museum			41.131834°S 73.029156°W	Frutillar Bajo, Frutillar, Los Lagos, Chile, Chile	

== Europe ==
Building	Image	Dates	Location	City, State	Description
Rundscheune Bollbrügge			54.329023°N 10.947101°E	Ostholstein, Schleswig-Holstein, Germany	
The Wonderful Barn		1743 completed	53.359757°N 6.510011°W	Leixlip, County Kildare, Ireland	a granary
Bottle Tower (Dublin) aka Hall's Barn		1742 built	53.295924°N 6.268791°W	Whitehall Road, Churchtown, Dublin, Ireland	Derivative of The Wonderful Barn
Bakendorf round barn			Zum Resthof 7; 53.498948°N 11.237310°E	Bakendorf, Mecklenburg-Western Pomerania, Germany	Now a converted barn
Fincken Round Barn			53°21′20″N 12°26′33″E	Fincken, district Müritz, Mecklenburg-Western Pomerania, Germany	Used as a fire station
Bjärtrå Folk Museum Round Barn		circa 1858	62°59′19″N 17°52′33″E	Bjärtrå, near Kramfors, Sweden	
Round Barn in Viätt			63°04′18″N 17°49′43″E	Viätt, Kramfors, Sweden	Hexagonal, log barn or granary
Nätra Folk Museum Round Barn			63°12′06″N 18°31′10″E	Örnsköldsvik, Sweden	Technically an octagonal, log granary
