= Round Barn =

A Round barn is a historic type of barn.

Round Barn may also refer to:

- Round Barn, Buckingham Township, Buckingham, Iowa, listed on the National Register of Historic Places (NRHP) in Tama County
- Round Barn, Bruce Township Section 3, Eagle Center, Iowa, NRHP-listed
- Round Barn, Bruce Township Section 6, La Porte, Iowa, NRHP-listed
- Round Barn, Cooper Township, Mapleton, Iowa, NRHP-listed
- Round Barn, Dubuque Township, Dubuque, Iowa, NRHP-listed
- Round Barn, Millville Township, Millville, Iowa, NRHP-listed
- Round Barn, Norway Township, Scarville, Iowa, NRHP-listed
- Round Barn, Pilot Grove Township, Sennett, Iowa, NRHP-listed
- Round Barn, Washington Township (Janesville, Iowa), NRHP-listed
- Round Barn, Washington Township (Sciola, Iowa), NRHP-listed
- Round Barn (Columbus Grove, Ohio), NRHP-listed
- Round Barn (Lima, Ohio), NRHP-listed
- Round Barn (New Hampshire, Ohio), NRHP-listed
- Round Barn (Paulding, Ohio), NRHP-listed
- Round Barn (Van Wert, Ohio), NRHP-listed
- Doncaster Round Barn, Twin Bridges, Montana, NRHP-listed

== See also ==
- List of round barns
