= James Greer McQuilkin Round Barn =

- U.S. National Register of Historic Places
- Location within Iowa Location within the United States
- Location: County Road D56
- Nearest city: Eagle Center, Iowa
- Coordinates: 42°15′51″N 91°47′43″W
- Area: less than one acre
- Built: 1918
- Built by: James Greer McQuilkin
- MPS: Iowa Round Barns: The Sixty Year Experiment TR
- NRHP reference No.: 86001414
- Added to NRHP: June 30, 1986

The James Greer McQuilkin Round Barn is a historic building located near Eagle Center in rural Benton County, Iowa, United States. It was built in 1918 for James Greer McQuilkin. He farmed and sold barns that were designed by Johnston Brothers' Clay Works. The building is a true round barn that measures 60 feet (18 m) in diameter. The barn is constructed of clay tile and features a hay dormer on the north side. The structure does not have a cupola, but has a silo that rises from the center. A new metal roof was added in 1998. It has been listed on the National Register of Historic Places since 1986.
