= De Turk Round Barn =

- U.S. National Register of Historic Places
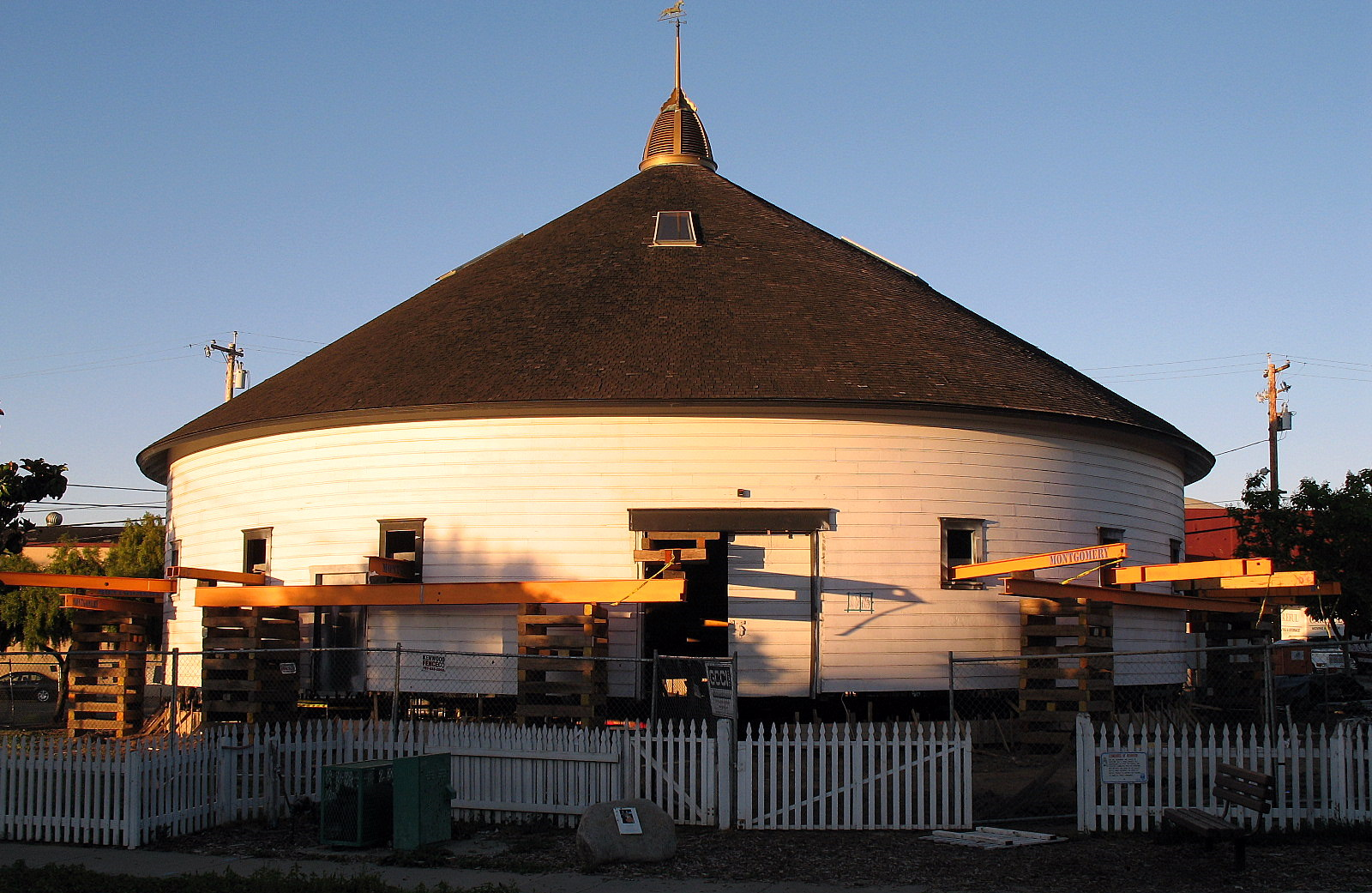
- Photo from 2010

- Location within California Location within the United States
- Location: 819 Donahue St., Santa Rosa, California
- Coordinates: 38°26′28″N 122°43′26″W
- Area: 1.2 acres (0.49 ha)
- Built: 1891
- Built by: Thomas J. Ludwig
- Architectural style: Round barn
- NRHP reference No.: 04000334
- Added to NRHP: April 21, 2004

The De Turk Round Barn in Santa Rosa, California, United States, is a round barn that was built in 1891 by Santa Rosa Winery owner De Turk. It was used for his champion trotter horses until his death in 1896. It was listed on the National Register of Historic Places in 2004.

It is significant as one of very few round or polygonal barns surviving in Northern California.
