= Couser Barn =

- U.S. National Register of Historic Places
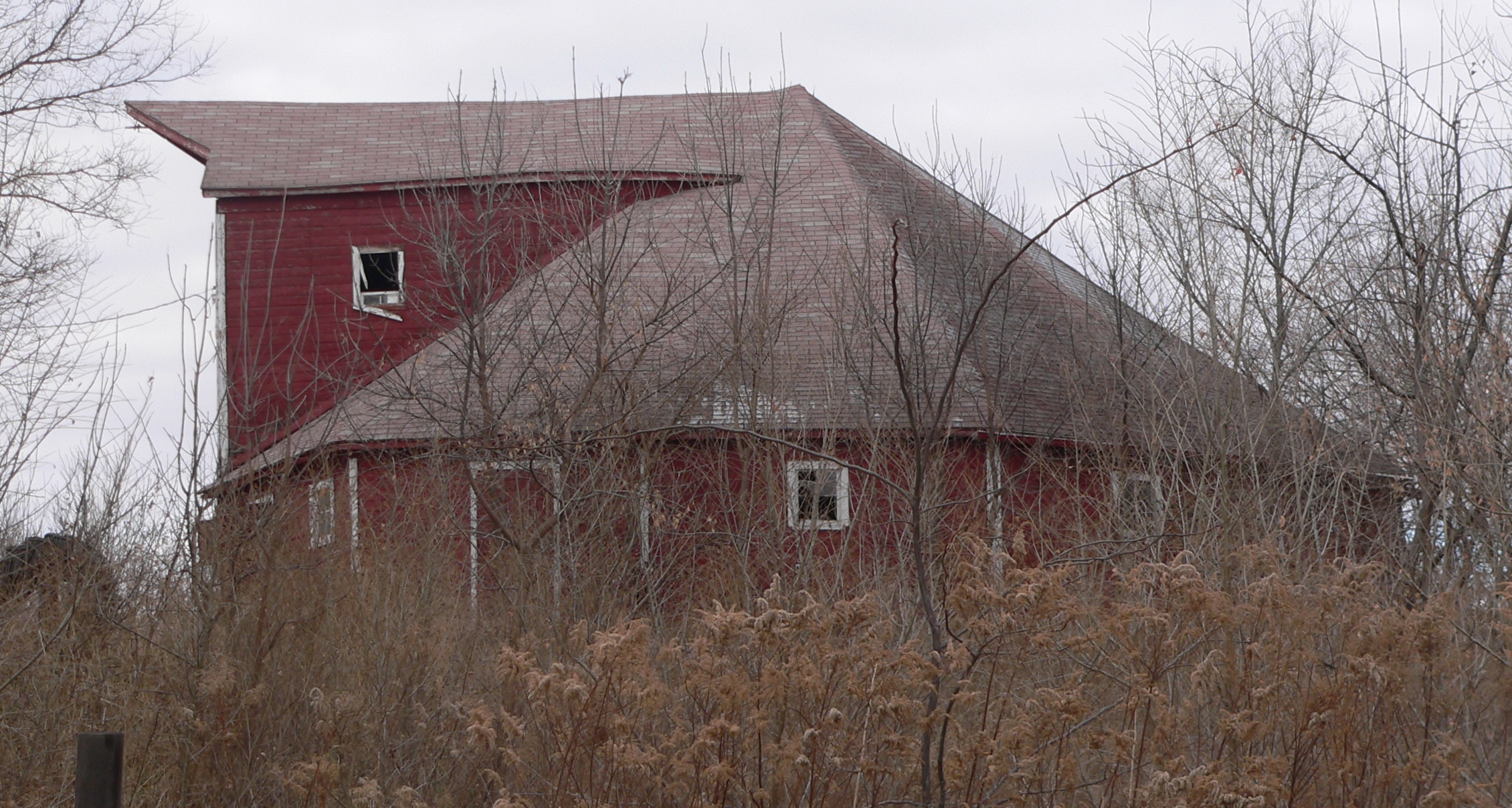
- Barn in 2010
- Nearest city: Laurel, Nebraska
- Area: less than one acre
- Built: 1912-13
- Architectural style: Centric Barn
- NRHP reference No.: 86001714
- Added to NRHP: July 17, 1986

The Couser Barn is a dodecagon-shaped round barn in Cedar County, Nebraska. It was built during 1912-13 for William Couser, a farmer who came to Nebraska from Shelby County, Iowa in 1899. It was built in the second phase of centric barn construction in Nebraska, when light balloon framing allowed for large open spaces to be created. An oral tradition holds that the design for the barn came from the University of Nebraska.

The barn has a hay hood.

== See also ==
- List of round barns
