= Octagon Round Barn, Indian Creek Township =

- U.S. National Register of Historic Places
- Location within Iowa Location within the United States
- Location: Off County Road S14
- Nearest city: Iowa Center, Iowa
- Coordinates: 41°57′0″N 93°27′6″W
- Area: less than one acre
- Built: 1880
- MPS: Iowa Round Barns: The Sixty Year Experiment TR
- NRHP reference No.: 86001439
- Added to NRHP: June 30, 1986

The Octagon Round Barn, Indian Creek Township is a historic building located near Iowa Center in rural Story County, Iowa, United States. It was built in around 1880 as a dairy barn. The octagon-shaped building measures 50 feet (15 m) in diameter. The modified hip roof, heavy timber framing, rectangular interior plan, and general purpose use marks this as a design influenced by Lorenzo S. Coffin, who built the first round barn in Iowa. It has been listed on the National Register of Historic Places since 1986. The barn has deteriorated significantly and it is essentially a pile of wood now.
