= Ridge Township, Carroll County, Missouri =

Township in Missouri, United States

Ridge Township, Missouri
- Township
- Location of Ridge Township, within Carroll County, Missouri
- Coordinates: 39.4794°N 93.3742°W
- Country: United States
- State: Missouri
- County: Carroll

Area
  - Total: 35.4 sq mi (92 km^{2})
  - Land: 35.36 sq mi (91.6 km^{2})
  - Water: 0.04 sq mi (0.10 km^{2})

Population (2020)
  - Total: 356
  - Density: 10.1/sq mi (3.89/km^{2})
- Time zone: UTC-6 (Central (CST))
  - Summer (DST): UTC-5 (CDT)
- GNIS feature ID: 766417

Ridge Township is a township in Carroll County, in the U.S. state of Missouri.

Ridge Township was named for the ridges within its borders. The population was 356 at the 2020 census.

There is a historic round barn on route 211 within the township (see List of round barns).
