= West View Farm =

- U.S. National Register of Historic Places
- U.S. Historic district
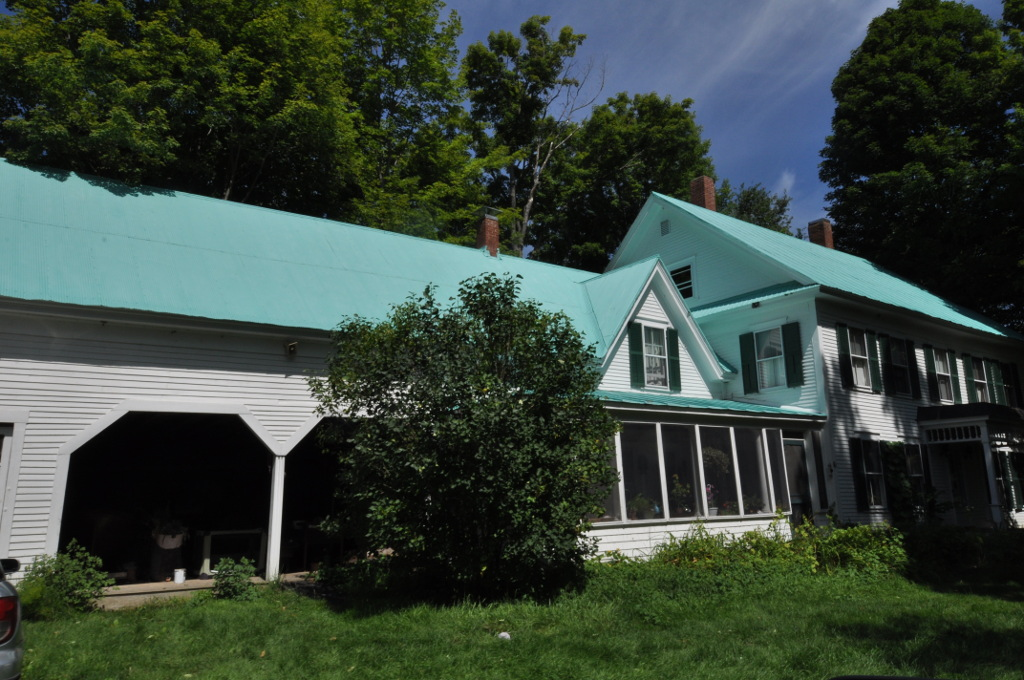

- Location within Vermont Location within the United States
- Location: Hastings Road (Waterbury Highway 34), Waterford, Vermont
- Coordinates: 44.403376°N 71.992921°W
- Area: 150 acres (61 ha)
- Built: 1860
- Built by: Quimby, Fred
- Architect: Packard, Lambert
- MPS: Agricultural Resources of Vermont MPS
- NRHP reference No.: 94001522
- Added to NRHP: January 6, 1995

The West View Farm is a historic farm property on Hastings Road (Town Highway 34) in Waterford, Vermont. The farm is unique for its distinctive round barn, built in 1903 to a design by St. Johnsbury architect Lambert Packard, and surviving 19th-century corn crib and smokehouse. The property was listed on the National Register of Historic Places in 1995. It includes a round barn.

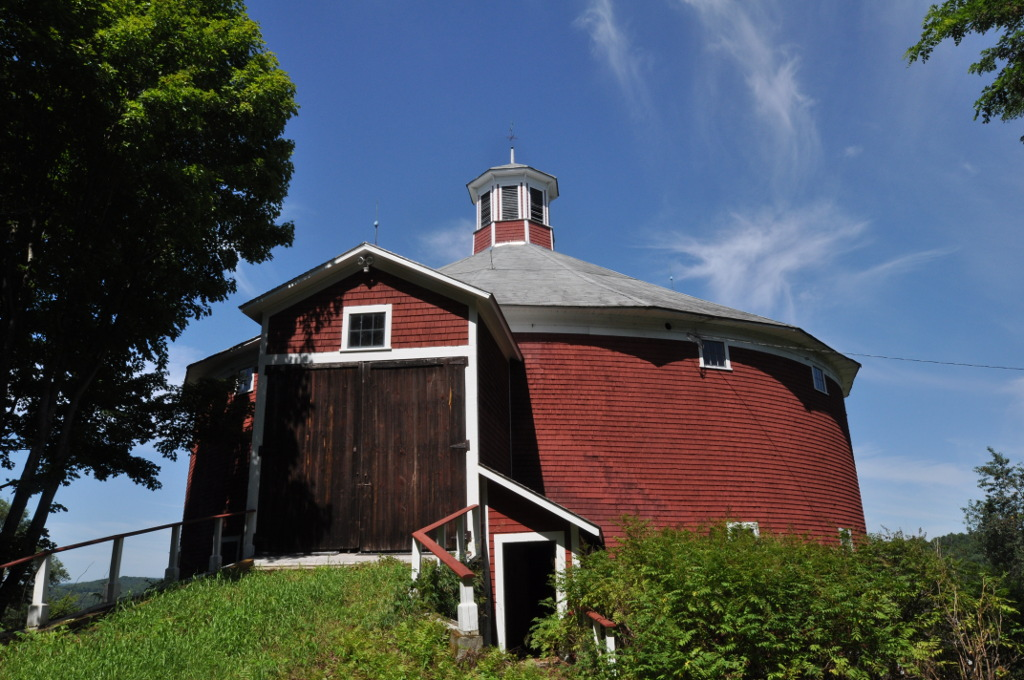
Round barn built in 1903, photographed in 2016

== Description and history ==
West View Farm is located in a rural setting of western Waterford, on 150 acres (61 ha) on either side of Hastings Road, now a spur road ending at the farmstead complex. Most of the property is wooded, but there are open fields for hay and pasture near the farmstead. Buildings in the farm cluster include a rambling c. 1860 Greek Revival farmhouse with several extending ells, a c. 1860 smokehouse, a c. 1870 corn crib, an early 20th-century poultry house, and a large round barn built in 1903. The barn is three levels high, with the bottom two levels unobstructed except for the central circular silo. Its exterior is clad in wooden shingles.

The farm property was established in 1807 by Josiah Hastings. The present farmhouse was built by his son Curtis about 1860. The round barn was one of the last works designed by St. Johnsbury architect Lambert Packard, and is one of a small number of surviving early 20th-century round barns in the state. It was built by Fred Quimby, a carpenter from Barnet who was locally known for his silos. It was also an instant tourist attraction, drawing 2,000 visitors in the first year after its construction in 1903. The farm's smokehouse and corn crib are also two rare surviving examples of 19th-century outbuildings of their type.

== See also ==
- National Register of Historic Places listings in Caledonia County, Vermont
- List of round barns
