= Frank Littleton Round Barn =

- U.S. National Register of Historic Places
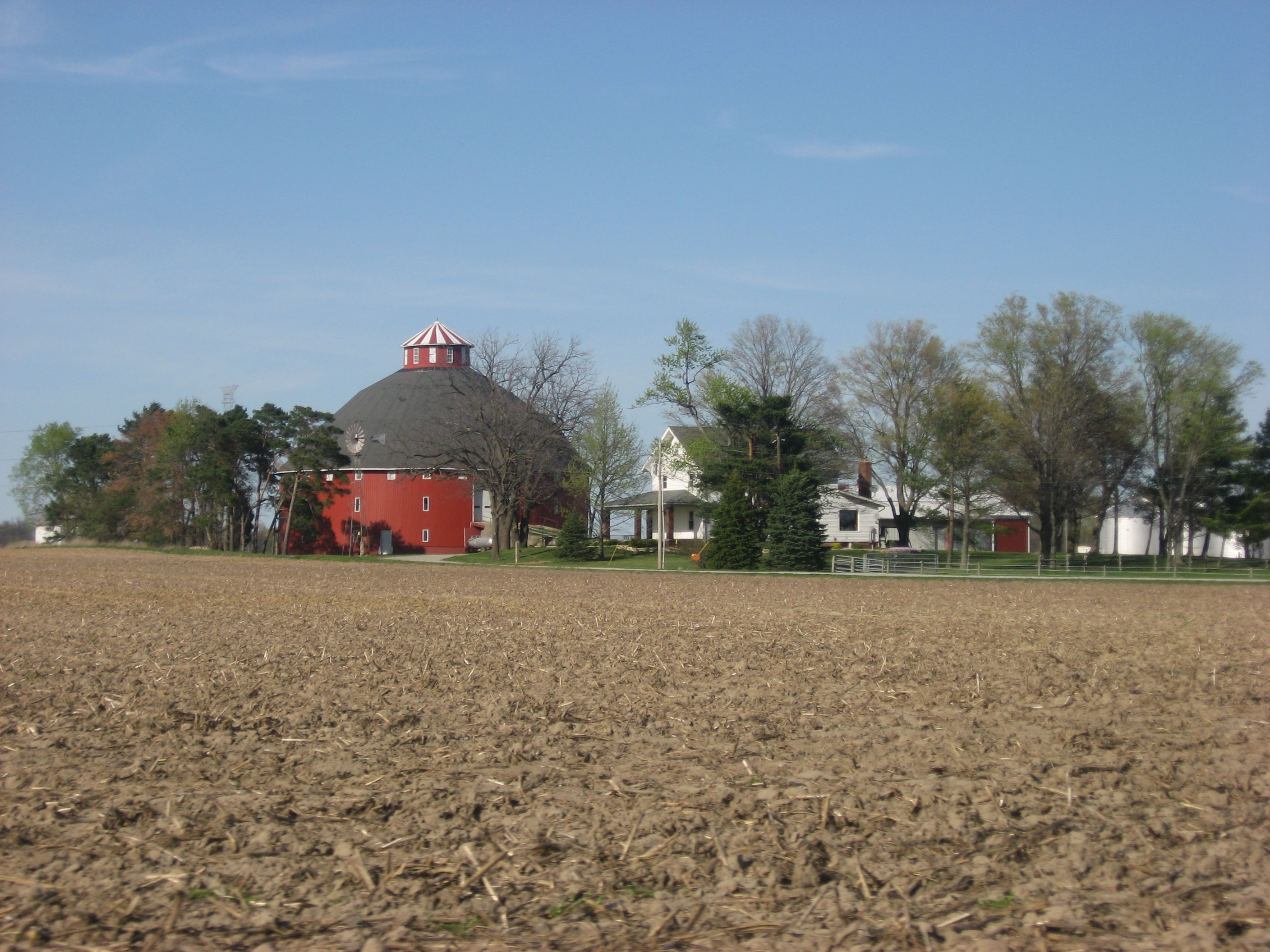
- Distant view of the barn and surrounding farm buildings

- Location within Indiana Location within the United States
- Location: Near the junction of County Roads 600N and 500W, northeast of Mount Comfort
- Nearest city: Mount Comfort, Indiana
- Coordinates: 39°52′22.2″N 85°53′24.5″W
- Area: Less than 1 acre (0.40 ha)
- Built: 1903
- Built by: Benton Steele, et al.
- Architectural style: True circular barn
- MPS: Round and Polygonal Barns of Indiana MPS
- NRHP reference No.: 93000184
- Added to NRHP: April 2, 1993

The Frank Littleton Round Barn, also known as the "Littleton-Pulliam Round Barn", is a round barn near Mount Comfort, Indiana, United States. Built in 1903, it was listed on the National Register of Historic Places in 1993.

At 102 feet in diameter, it is the largest round barn ever built in the state. It was built for attorney and state legislator Frank L. Littleton, who wanted to best the accomplishment of fellow legislator, Congressman Wymond Beckett of Indianapolis, who had a 100-foot diameter barn. The barn was built in 1902 by Isaac McHamee, his son Emery McHamee, Benton Steele, and Horace Duncan.

The barn's design was used as documentation in a U.S. patent application, "Improvements to the Self-Supported Conical Roof", a patent which was granted in 1905 to Littleton, Isaac McNamee and Horace Duncan. A 1991 study indicates that "many farmers began building multi-sided (6, 8, 10, 12, 14 and 16-sided) barns to skirt ... infringement" upon the patent.

== See also ==
- List of round barns
