= Miller Round Barn =

- U.S. National Register of Historic Places
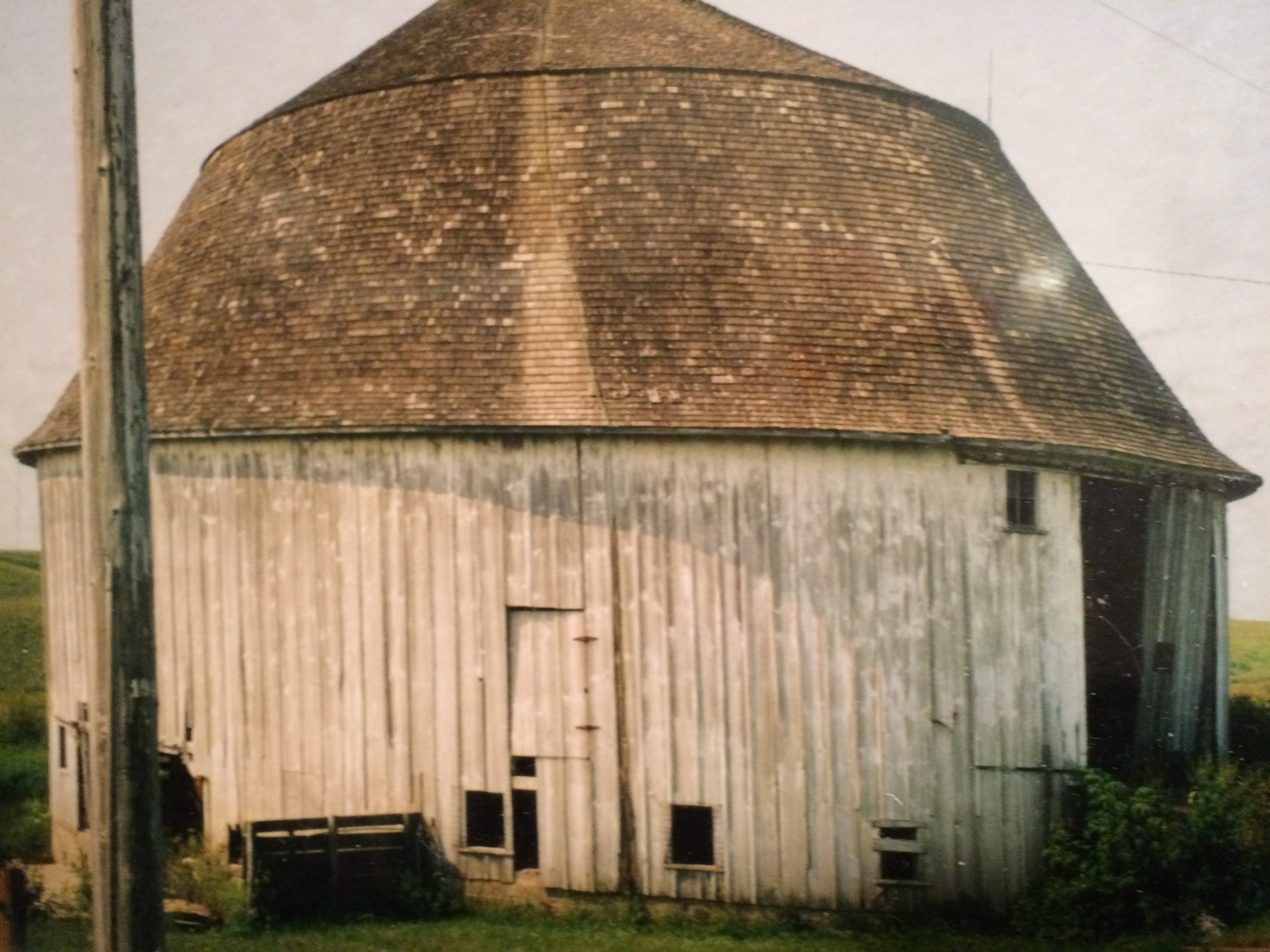

- Location within Iowa Location within the United States
- Location: County Road F62
- Nearest city: Sharon Center, Iowa
- Coordinates: 41°33′38″N 91°37′52″W
- Area: less than one acre
- Built: 1918
- Built by: John Schrader
- MPS: Iowa Round Barns: The Sixty Year Experiment TR
- NRHP reference No.: 86001445
- Added to NRHP: June 30, 1986

The Miller Round Barn was a historic building located near Sharon Center in rural Johnson County, Iowa, United States. It was constructed in 1918 by John Schrader. The bank barn that was built on a slope was an example of the Illinois Agricultural Experiment Station / H.E. Crouch type. The building was a true round barn that measured 60 feet (18 m) in diameter. It was covered in white vertical siding and features a two-pitch roof and a 10-foot (3.0 m) central silo. It was listed on the National Register of Historic Places since 1986. The barn has subsequently been torn down.
