= Herman Wood Round Barn =

- U.S. National Register of Historic Places
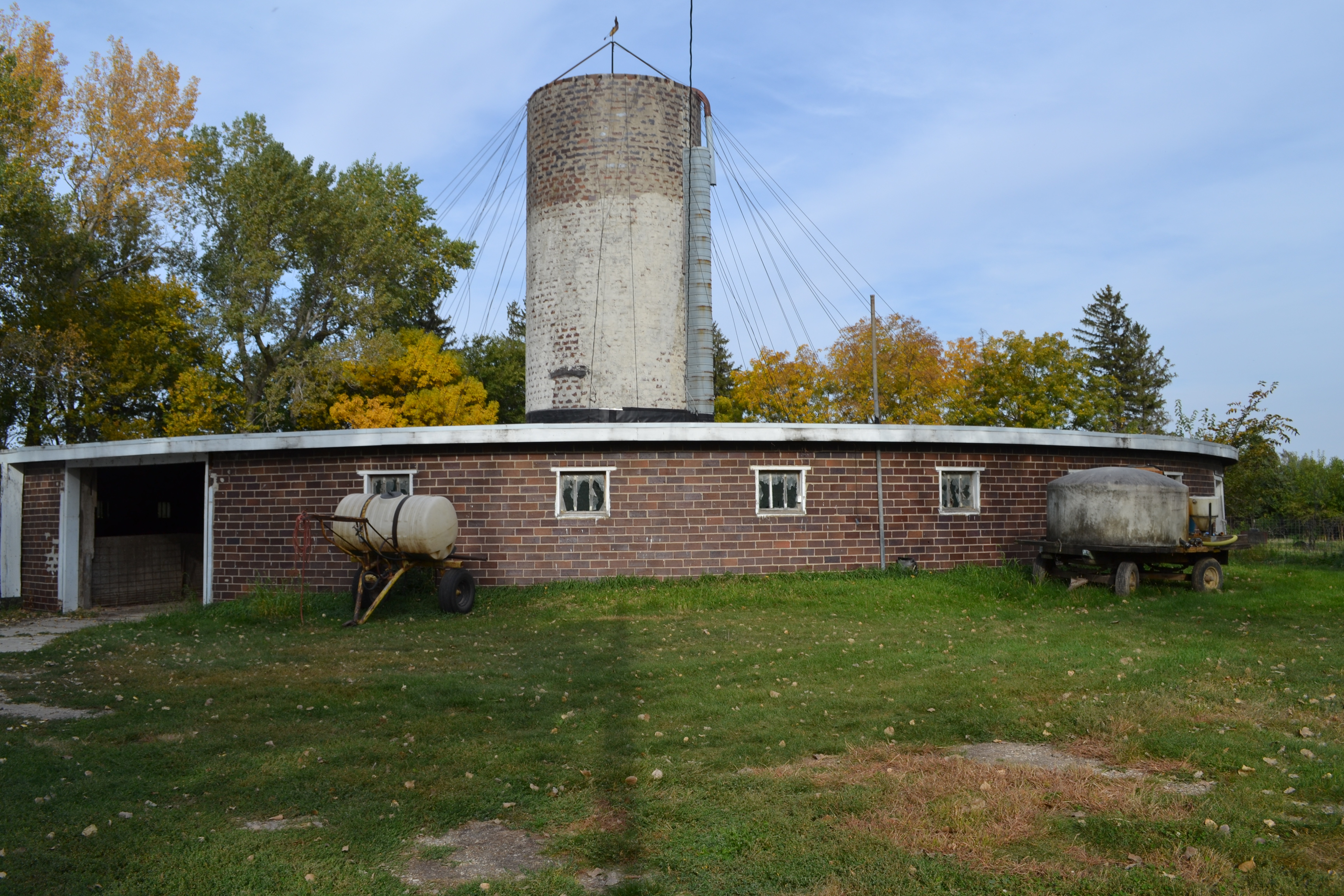

- Location within Iowa Location within the United States
- Location: U.S. Route 65
- Nearest city: Iowa Falls, Iowa
- Coordinates: 42°33′28″N 93°15′2″W
- Area: less than one acre
- Built: 1916
- Built by: Herman Wood
- MPS: Iowa Round Barns: The Sixty Year Experiment TR
- NRHP reference No.: 86001431
- Added to NRHP: June 30, 1986

The Herman Wood Round Barn is a historic building located near Iowa Falls in rural Franklin County, Iowa, United States. It was built in 1916 by Herman Wood as a cattle barn. Matt King of the Permanent Buildings Society of Des Moines acted as the building consultant. The building is a true round barn that measures 122 feet (37 m) in diameter. The barn is constructed of clay tile and features a 20-foot (6.1 m) silo that extends through the flat roof. The rather large structure is one of the more unusual round barns in Iowa. The rolled-asphalt roof is suspended by wire cables that are hooked to rods at the top of the silo. King designed the system and wrote an article concerning the barn's construction in a 1917 issue of American Carpenter and Builder. The barn has been listed on the National Register of Historic Places since 1986.
