= Ehlers Round Barn =

Former historic structure in Roca, Nebraska, US

- Formerly listed on the U.S. National Register of Historic Places
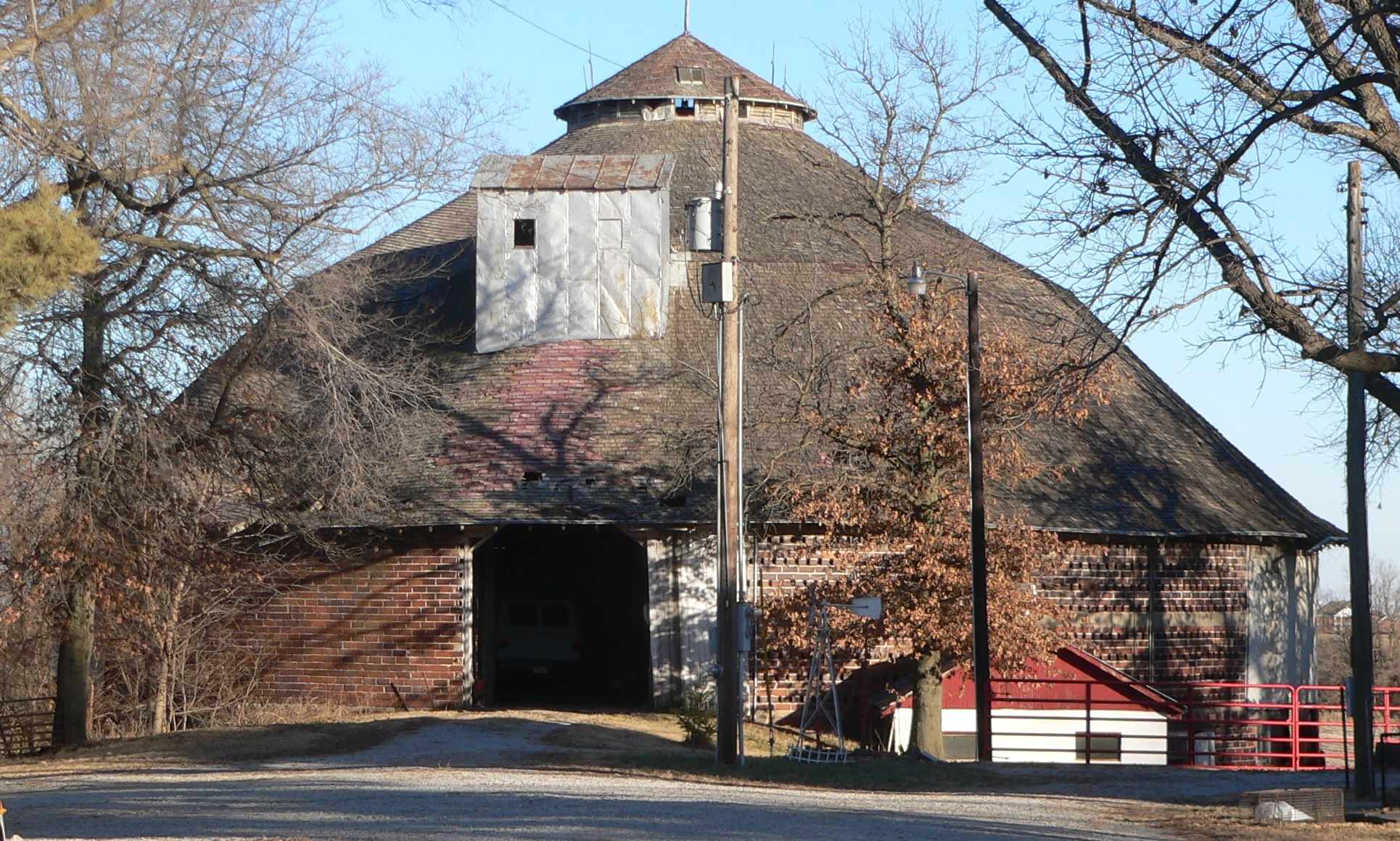
- January 2012 photo

- Location within Nebraska Location within the United States
- Nearest city: Roca, Nebraska
- Coordinates: 40°41′32″N 96°34′20″W
- Built: 1922
- Built by: Ehlers, Harvey
- NRHP reference No.: 95000799

Significant dates
- Added to NRHP: June 30, 1995
- Removed from NRHP: December 31, 2013

Ehlers Round Barn, in Roca, Nebraska, was completed in 1924 by Harvey W. Ehlers. It was listed on the National Register of Historic Places for its innovative and efficient architecture in 1995.

A snowstorm on 4 February 2012 resulted in severe damage to the structure, and it is purportedly "beyond repair." It was delisted on December 31, 2013.
