= Clarence Kleinkopf Round Barn =

Historic barn in Illinois, United States

- U.S. National Register of Historic Places
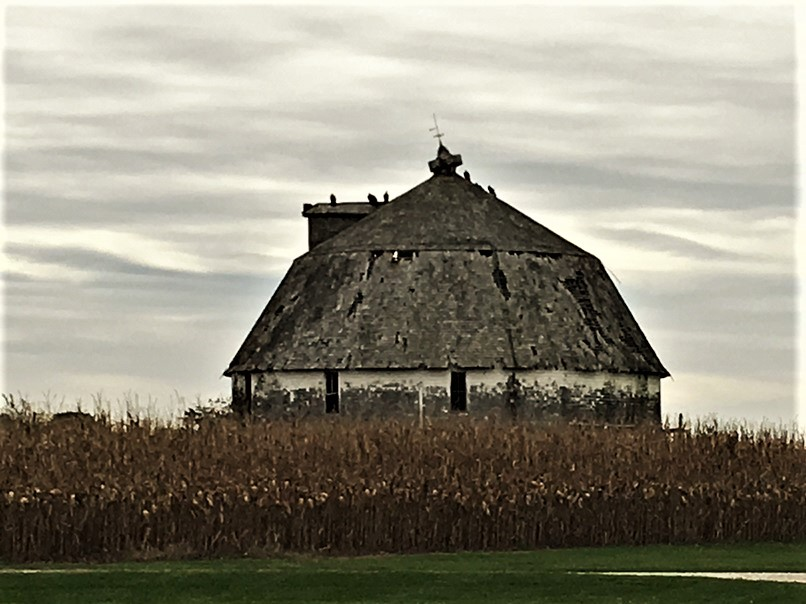

- Location within Illinois Location within the United States
- Location: McDonough County, Illinois, USA
- Nearest city: Colchester
- Area: less than one acre
- Built: 1915
- Architect: Dick Carmack
- Architectural style: Round barns
- MPS: Round Barns in Illinois TR
- NRHP reference No.: 82002586
- Added to NRHP: August 26, 1982

The Clarence Kleinkopf Round Barn is a round barn in McDonough County, Illinois, United States. The correct GPS coordinates are: 40.45506936294263, -90.81113789160236. Carpenter Dick Carmack built the barn in 1915 for farmer George Welch. The wooden barn has a diameter of 56 feet (17 m) and a shingled hip roof. The barn's entrances are on the west, south, and northwest sides. A haymow encircles three-quarters of the barn at the roof's base, and a ventilator sits at the roof's peak.

The barn was added to the National Register of Historic Places in 1982. It is one of the original round barns submitted to the Register as part of the Round Barns in Illinois Multiple Property Submission.

Two other barns built by Carmack within 2 miles no longer survive.
