= Ben Colter Polygonal Barn =

- U.S. National Register of Historic Places
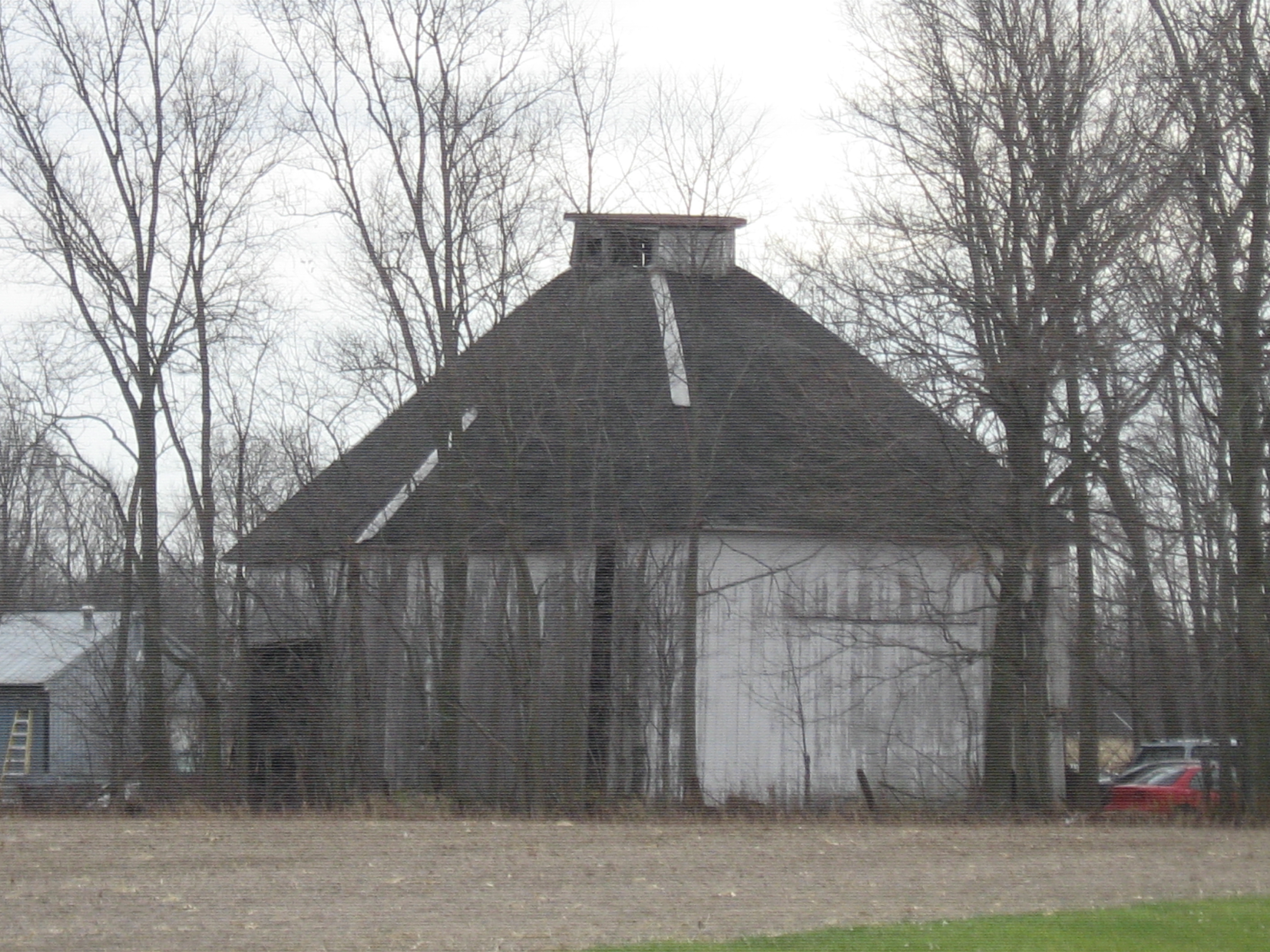
- Ben Colter Polygonal Barn, November 2011

- Location within Adams County, Indiana Location within Indiana Location within the United States
- Location: Eastern side of State Road 101, 0.6 miles south of its junction with Piqua Rd. and north of Pleasant Mills, St. Marys Township, Adams County, Indiana
- Coordinates: 40°47′53″N 84°50′27″W
- Area: less than one acre
- Built: c. 1907
- Built by: Colter, Ben
- Architectural style: Six-sided barn
- MPS: Round and Polygonal Barns of Indiana MPS
- NRHP reference No.: 93000194
- Added to NRHP: April 2, 1993

Ben Colter Polygonal Barn, also known as the Reinhart Barn, is a historic hexagonal barn located at St. Marys Township, Adams County, Indiana. It was built about 1907, and is a six-sided, two-story, frame barn with a cone roof and cupola. Attached to the barn is a drive-through shed.

It was listed on the National Register of Historic Places in 1993.
