= Shafer Round Barn =

- U.S. National Register of Historic Places
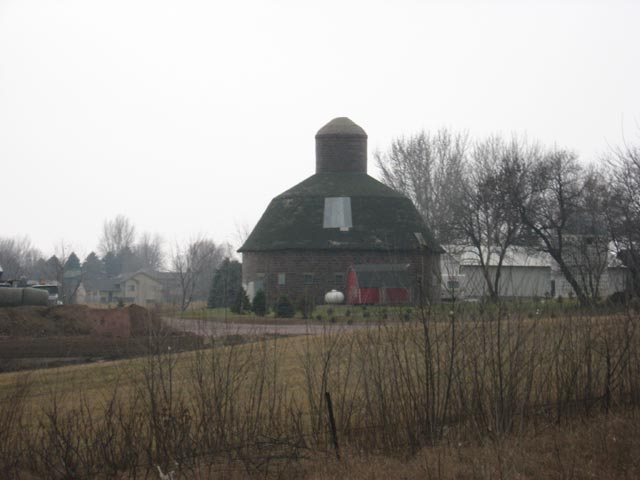

- Location within South Dakota Location within the United States
- Nearest city: Sioux Falls, South Dakota
- Coordinates: 43°32′31″N 96°38′58″W
- Area: less than one acre
- Built: 1920
- Built by: JohnsTon Brothers
- Architectural style: Round barn
- MPS: South Dakota's Round and Polygonal Barns and Pavilions MPS
- NRHP reference No.: 95001470
- Added to NRHP: December 14, 1995

The Shafer Round Barn near Sioux Falls, South Dakota, United States, is a round barn that was built in 1920. It was listed on the National Register of Historic Places in 1995.
