= Cota Round Barns =

- U.S. National Register of Historic Places
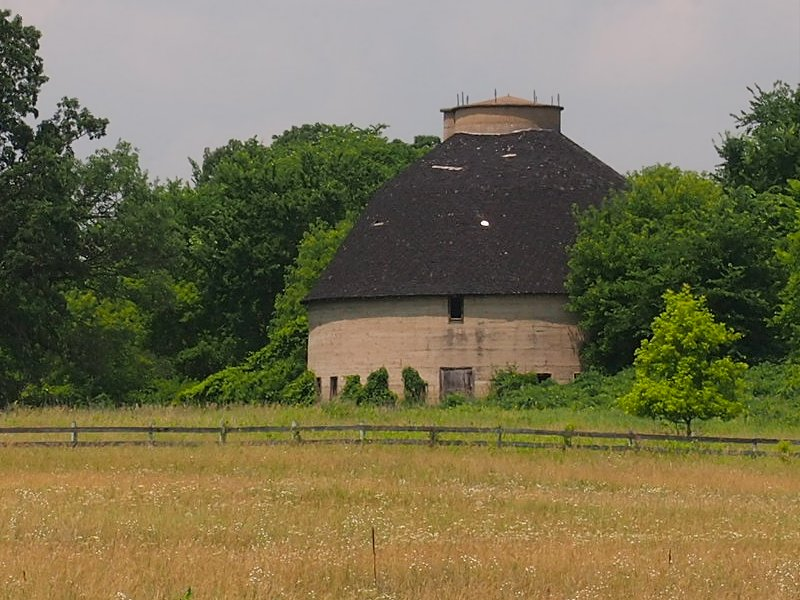
- One of the Cota Round Barns from Benton County Highway 23

- Location within Minnesota Location within the United States
- Nearest city: St. Cloud, Minnesota
- Coordinates: 45°34′46″N 93°56′50″W
- Area: 3.5 acres (1.4 ha)
- Built: 1921
- Built by: Cota, Al
- MPS: Benton County MRA
- NRHP reference No.: 82002936
- Added to NRHP: April 6, 1982

The Cota Round Barns near St. Cloud, Minnesota, United States, are reinforced concrete round barns built in 1921. The set of barns was listed on the National Register of Historic Places in 1982. According to a survey of Benton County historic resources, the Cota Round Barns are "a notable link" with the agricultural developments of 1880–1900 in the area.
