= Spotts Round Barn =

- U.S. National Register of Historic Places
- Location within Iowa Location within the United States
- Location: Iowa Highway 14
- Nearest city: Charles City, Iowa
- Coordinates: 43°03′32.6″N 92°43′28.9″W
- Area: less than one acre
- Built: 1914
- Architect: Johnson Brothers Clay Works
- MPS: Iowa Round Barns: The Sixty Year Experiment TR
- NRHP reference No.: 86001430
- Added to NRHP: June 30, 1986

The Spotts Round Barn is a historic building located near Charles City in rural Floyd County, Iowa, United States. It was built in 1914 as a dairy and horse barn. Its design was influenced by the Iowa Agricultural Experiment Station. The building is a true round barn that measures 55 feet (17 m) in diameter. It is constructed of clay tile from the Johnston Brothers Clay Works. It features a two-pitch roof, a large hay dormer on the north side and a 12-foot (3.7 m) central silo. The barn has been listed on the National Register of Historic Places since 1986.
