= Fred W. Meier Round Barn =

- U.S. National Register of Historic Places
- Location within Iowa Location within the United States
- Location: Off Iowa Highway 9
- Nearest city: Ludlow, Iowa
- Coordinates: 43°14′7″N 91°28′40″W
- Area: less than one acre
- Built: 1912
- Built by: Fred W. Meier
- MPS: Iowa Round Barns: The Sixty Year Experiment TR
- NRHP reference No.: 86001411
- Added to NRHP: June 30, 1986

The Fred W. Meier Round Barn was a historic building located near the unincorporated community of Ludlow in rural Allamakee County, Iowa, United States. It was built in 1912 by Fred W. Meier. The building was a true round barn that measures 56 feet (17 m) in diameter. The bottom half of the barn was constructed in stone and featured red horizontal siding, 2-pitch conical roof, aerator and an internal wood stave silo. It was listed on the National Register of Historic Places in 1986. The structure was destroyed in a thunderstorm during the night of July 27, 2002.
