= Corson Emminger Round Barn =

- U.S. National Register of Historic Places
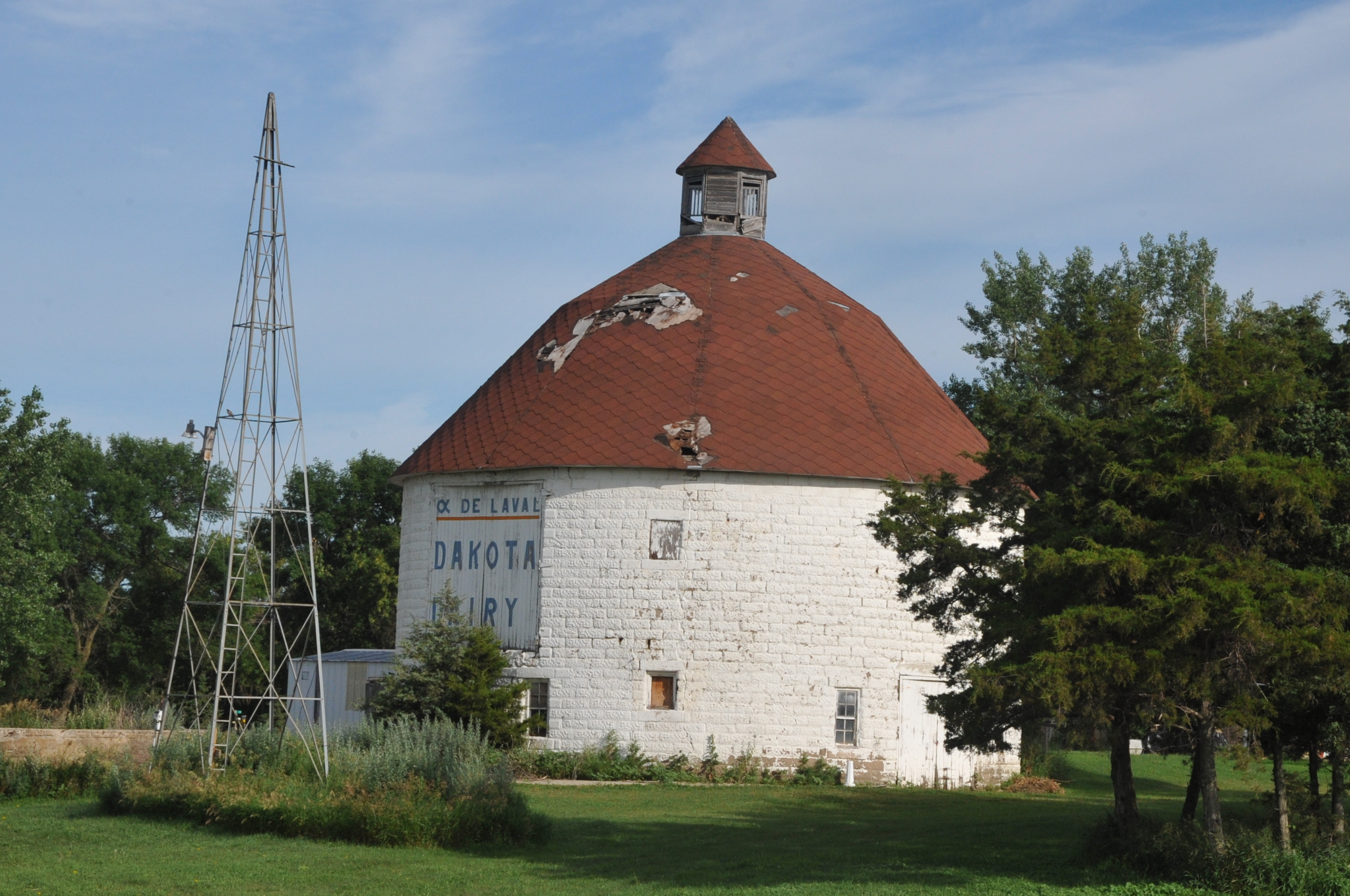
- The barn in July 2013

- Location within South Dakota Location within the United States
- Nearest city: Watertown, South Dakota
- Coordinates: 44.86128°N 97.10946°W
- Area: 1 acre (0.40 ha)
- Built: 1909-10
- Built by: Emminger, Corson
- Architectural style: Round barn
- NRHP reference No.: 78002546
- Added to NRHP: March 30, 1978

The Corson Emminger Round Barn near Watertown, South Dakota, United States, is a round barn that was built during 1909–1910 by Corson Emminger. It was listed on the National Register of Historic Places in 1978.

It is "extremely tall", on a 50-foot-diameter (15 m) base. It is built of concrete blocks. It has a double-pitched roof topped by a polygonal cupola with a conical top. It used to have ramps leading to two large entrances on the second level.

There are few round barns in South Dakota; Emminger may have brought the idea of building one from Wisconsin, his native state, from which he arrived in the early 1900s. He bought the farm property in 1905 for $6,000, and he built the barn at cost of $1,500 to use as a dairy barn. He moved into Watertown in 1914 and to California in 1920. Jacob Krull bought the farm for $13,600 and owned it, with exception of one year, until 1943.

Its National Register nomination asserts it is "truly a landmark in South Dakota", noting that it is located on one of the state's main highways.

It is located on U.S. Route 81, about 2 miles (3.2 km) west of parallel Interstate 29.
