= Sylvanus Marriage Octagonal Barn =

- U.S. National Register of Historic Places
- Location within North Dakota Location within the United States
- Nearest city: New Rockford, North Dakota
- Coordinates: 47°36′50″N 99°5′50″W
- Area: less than one acre
- Built: 1902
- Architectural style: Octagonal barn
- MPS: North Dakota Round Barns TR
- NRHP reference No.: 86002748
- Added to NRHP: October 7, 1986

The Sylvanus Marriage Octagonal Barn near New Rockford, North Dakota, United States, was built in 1902. It meets the current, practical definition for a round barn. It was listed on the National Register of Historic Places in 1986.
