= Frantz Round Barn =

- U.S. National Register of Historic Places

- Location within Iowa Location within the United States
- Location: Off U.S. Route 30
- Nearest city: Grand Junction, Iowa
- Coordinates: 42°2′19″N 94°12′4″W
- Area: less than one acre
- Built: 1911
- Built by: Beecher Lamb
- MPS: Iowa Round Barns: The Sixty Year Experiment TR
- NRHP reference No.: 86001432
- Added to NRHP: June 30, 1986

The Frantz Round Barn is a historic building that was located near Grand Junction in rural Greene County, Iowa, United States. It was built by Beecher Lamb in 1911. The true round barn measured 55 feet (17 m) in diameter. The barn was constructed in concrete block from Mid-Iowa Concrete of Grand Junction. It featured a 56-foot (17 m) tall central silo that was 16-foot (4.9 m) in diameter. The interior had a circular around the central silo on the first floor. The second floor had stalls for 12-14 horses, a circular, haymow, and granary. The barn was listed on the National Register of Historic Places since 1986. It has subsequently been torn down.
