= Levi Glick Round Barn =

Historic barn in North Dakota, United States

- U.S. National Register of Historic Places
- Location within North Dakota Location within the United States
- Nearest city: Surrey, North Dakota
- Coordinates: 48°13′29″N 101°10′20″W
- Area: less than one acre
- Built: 1923
- Built by: Levi Kaufmann
- Architectural style: Round barn
- MPS: North Dakota Round Barns TR
- NRHP reference No.: 86002760
- Added to NRHP: March 25, 1987

The Levi Glick Round Barn near Surrey, North Dakota, United States, is a round barn that was built in 1923 by ethnic German immigrants. It was listed on the National Register of Historic Places in 1987.

It is "the only masonry tile round barn built in the state" and may also be associated significantly with "history of the Mennonites, the particular North Dakota ethnic group associated with the barn."
