= Eckle Round Barn =

- U.S. National Register of Historic Places
- Location within Iowa Location within the United States
- Location: Off Iowa Highway 168
- Nearest city: Shelby, Iowa
- Coordinates: 41°30′20″N 95°29′37″W
- Area: less than one acre
- Built: 1928
- Built by: Ed Brown; George Robinson
- MPS: Iowa Round Barns: The Sixty Year Experiment TR
- NRHP reference No.: 86001470
- Added to NRHP: June 30, 1986

The Eckle Round Barn is a historic building that was located near Shelby in rural Pottawattamie County, Iowa, United States. The true round barn was built by Ed Brown and George Robinson in 1928 for Richard Eckle. It has a diameter of 54 feet (16 m). The barn featured white horizontal siding, a two-pitch sectional roof, aerator and a central clay tile silo with a 14-foot (4.3 m) diameter. The barn was listed on the National Register of Historic Places in 1986. It has subsequently been torn down.
