= Rodman Octagonal Barn =

- Formerly listed on the U.S. National Register of Historic Places
- Location within North Dakota Location within the United States
- Nearest city: Edgeley, North Dakota
- Coordinates: 46°24′33″N 98°47′17″W
- Area: less than one acre
- Built: c. 1890
- Built by: Luman B. Rodman
- Architectural style: Octagonal barn
- MPS: North Dakota Round Barns TR
- NRHP reference No.: 86002753

Significant dates
- Added to NRHP: October 7, 1986
- Removed from NRHP: July 14, 2015

The Rodman Octagonal Barn near Edgeley, North Dakota was built in about 1890 by Luman B. Rodman. It was listed on the National Register of Historic Places in 1986.

It is a large building with each side of its eight sides approximately 26 feet (7.9 m) wide. The east, entrance side projects forward about 6 feet (1.8 m). The building has an unusual roof which includes hay dormers.

This building was removed from the National Register of Historic Places in 2015 as it had been demolished.
