= C.A. Rownd Round Barn =

- U.S. National Register of Historic Places
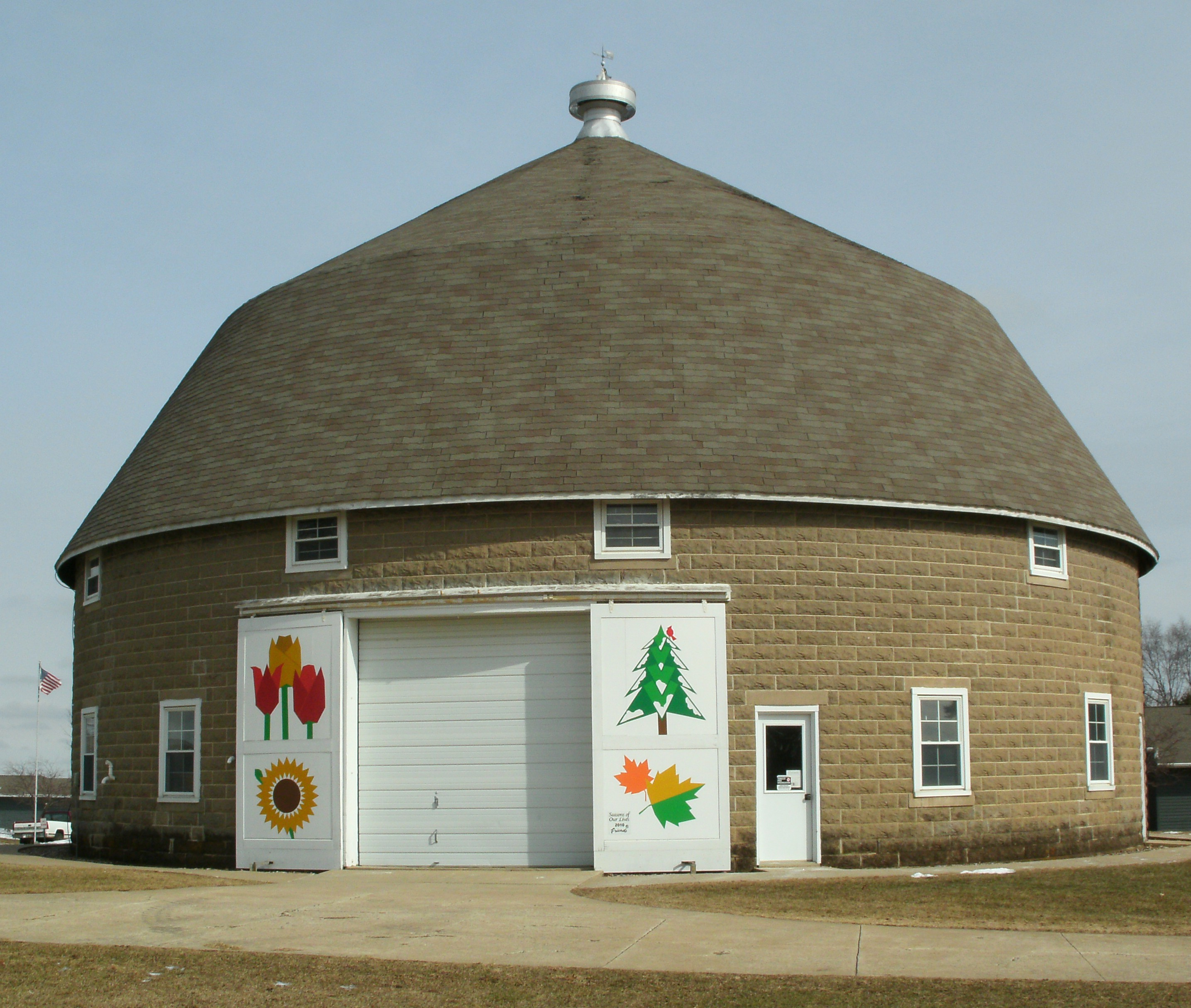

- Location within Iowa Location within the United States
- Location: 5102 S. Main; Cedar Falls, Iowa
- Coordinates: 42°29′30.7″N 92°26′41.1″W
- Area: less than one acre
- Built: 1911
- Built by: C.A. Rownd
- MPS: Iowa Round Barns: The Sixty Year Experiment TR
- NRHP reference No.: 86003193
- Added to NRHP: November 19, 1986

The C.A. Rownd Round Barn is a historic building located in Cedar Falls, Iowa, United States. It was built in 1911 by C.A. Rownd. It is constructed of ashlar-faced blocks that Rownd manufactured on the site. The barn was featured in the April 1912 edition of The Farm Cement News, which was published by Universal Portland Cement. The building is a true round barn that measures 83 feet (25 m) in diameter. It has been listed on the National Register of Historic Places since 1986.
