= Thompson-Wohlschlegel Round Barn =

- Formerly listed on the U.S. National Register of Historic Places
- Location within Kansas Location within the United States
- Nearest city: Harper, Kansas
- Coordinates: 37°16′33″N 97°58′4″W
- Area: less than one acre
- Built: 1910-13
- Built by: Russell, Bill
- Architect: Z.C. Thompson and C. R. Thompson
- NRHP reference No.: 85000315

Significant dates
- Added to NRHP: February 21, 1985
- Removed from NRHP: December 28, 2020

The Thompson-Wohlschlegel Round Barn near Harper, Kansas is a round barn that was built during 1910 to 1913. It was listed on the National Register of Historic Places in 1985, and was delisted in 2020.

It is about 80 feet (24 m) in diameter and has a three-tier domed roof which is 75 feet (23 m) tall. Its first floor walls are of rough concrete blocks. It is one of the largest and most elaborate round barns in Kansas. Owner Z.C. Thompson and his son first began pouring concrete blocks in 1910 with construction beginning in 1912.
