= Stennett, Iowa =

- Unincorporated community
- Location within Iowa Location within the United States
- Coordinates: 41°05′23″N 95°11′40″W
- Country: United States
- State: Iowa
- County: Montgomery
- Elevation: 1,142 ft (348 m)
- Time zone: UTC-6 (Central (CST))
  - Summer (DST): UTC-5 (CDT)
- Area code: 712
- GNIS feature ID: 464759

Stennett is an unincorporated community in Montgomery County, Iowa, United States. Stennett is located at the junction of County Highways H20 and M55, 5.7 miles (9.2 km) north-northeast of Red Oak.

== History ==
Stennett got its start in the year 1880 when a railroad switch was built through the territory to reach the Stennett stone quarry. Stennett's population was 28 in 1902, and 95 in 1925. The population was 25 in 1940.
