= Frank Uehling Barn =

- Uehling, Frank, Barn
- U.S. National Register of Historic Places
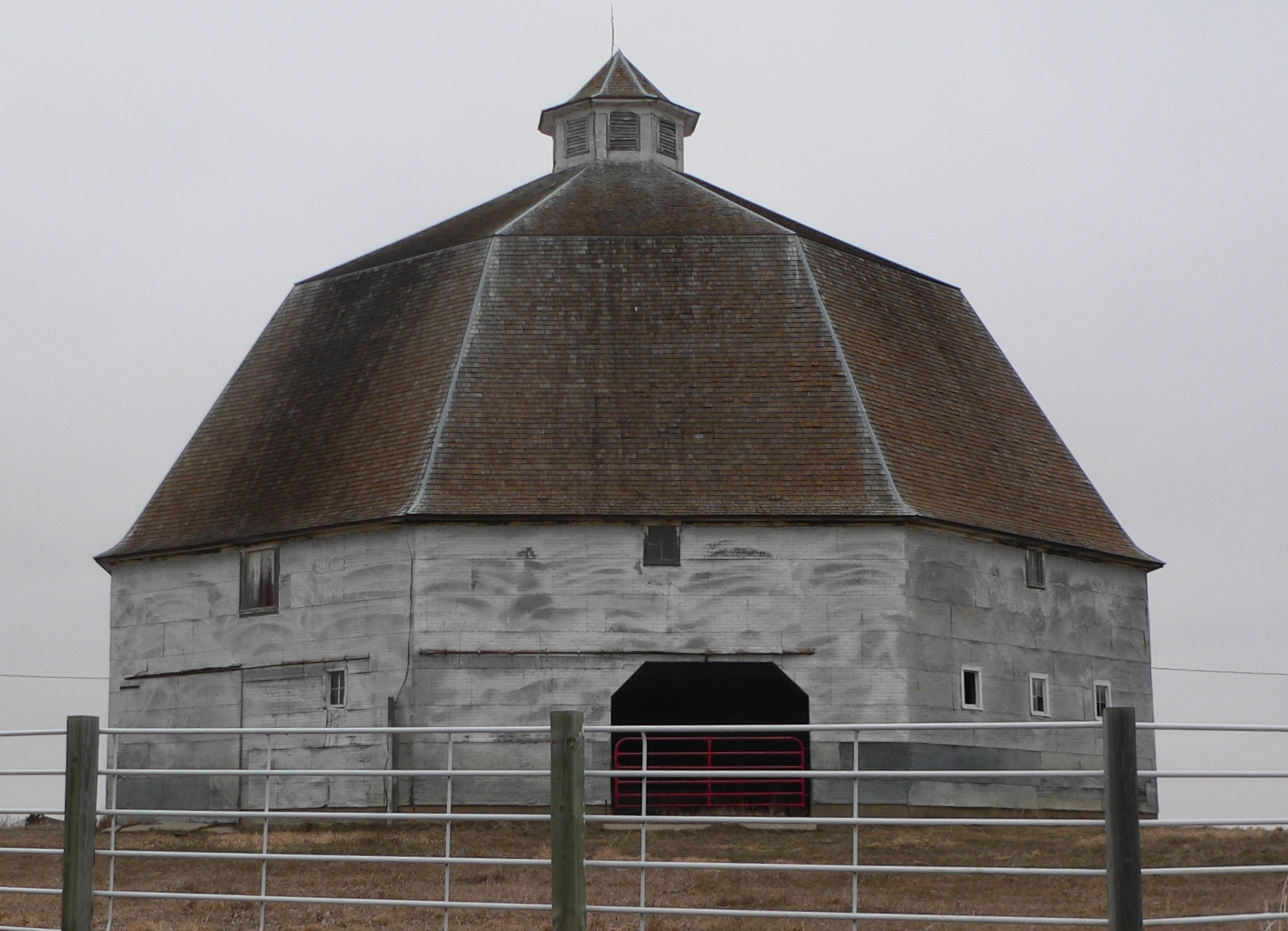

- Location within Nebraska
- Nearest city: Uehling, Nebraska
- Coordinates: 41°44′16″N 96°30′04″W
- Area: less than one acre
- Built: 1918
- Built by: Uehling, Frank
- Architectural style: Centric Barn
- NRHP reference No.: 85001666
- Added to NRHP: August 1, 1985

The Frank Uehling Barn, in rural Dodge County, Nebraska near Uehling, Nebraska, is a round barn which was built in 1918. It was listed on the National Register of Historic Places in 1985.

It is an octagonal building, about 30 feet (9.1 m) on each side, and about 80 feet (24 m) in "diameter" across.
