= Gerhardt Octagonal Pig House =

- Formerly listed on the U.S. National Register of Historic Places
- Location within North Dakota Location within the United States
- Nearest city: Gladstone, North Dakota
- Coordinates: 46°52′28″N 102°29′37″W
- Area: less than one acre
- Built: 1930
- Architectural style: Octagonal Pig-house
- MPS: North Dakota Round Barns TR
- NRHP reference No.: 86002758

Significant dates
- Added to NRHP: October 7, 1986
- Removed from NRHP: July 14, 2015

The Gerhardt Octagonal Pig House near Gladstone, North Dakota, United States, was built in 1930. It was listed on the National Register of Historic Places in 1986.

It was a pig brooding house which is 24 feet (7.3 m) in diameter.

This structure was removed from the National Register of Historic Places in 2015 as it had been demolished.
