= William Oakland Round Barn =

- U.S. National Register of Historic Places
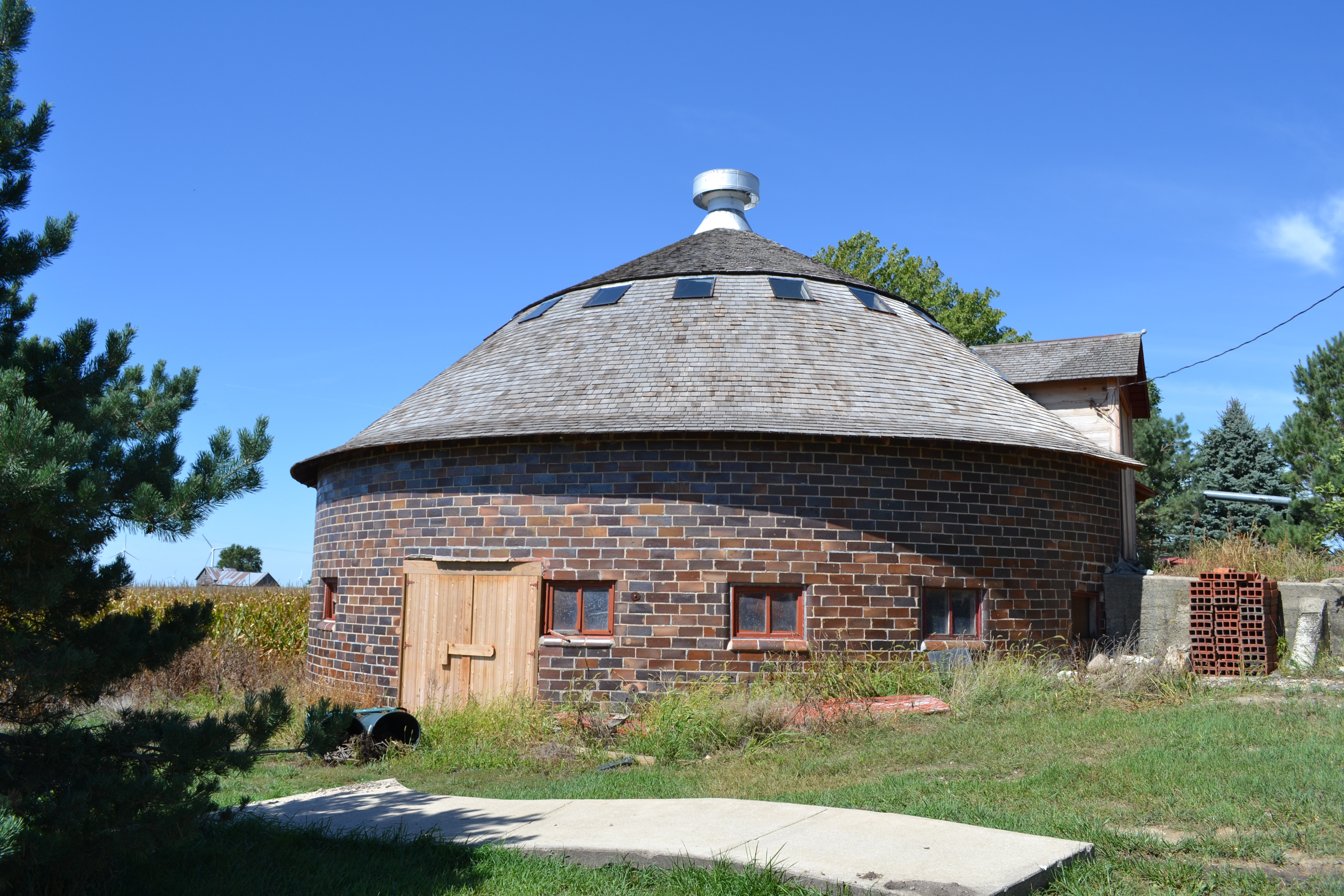

- Location within Iowa Location within the United States
- Location: Off U.S. Route 69
- Nearest city: Blairsburg, Iowa
- Coordinates: 42°29′11″N 93°38′0″W
- Area: less than one acre
- Built: 1910
- MPS: Iowa Round Barns: The Sixty Year Experiment TR
- NRHP reference No.: 86001434
- Added to NRHP: June 30, 1986

The William Oakland Round Barn is an historic building located near Blairsburg in rural Hamilton County, Iowa, United States. The true round barn measures 50 feet (15 m) in diameter. It is constructed of clay tiles and features a conical roof, aerator, a small dormer on the west side and a larger one on the east side as well as a 16 feet (4.9 m) central silo. William T. Oakland had this structure built in 1910 as a combination hog and sale barn. The ground floor was used for farrowing, while the sale ring was on the upper level. The 16 windows in roof provided light to the sales area. The barn has been listed on the National Register of Historic Places since 1986.
