= Raymond Schulz Round Barn =

- U.S. National Register of Historic Places
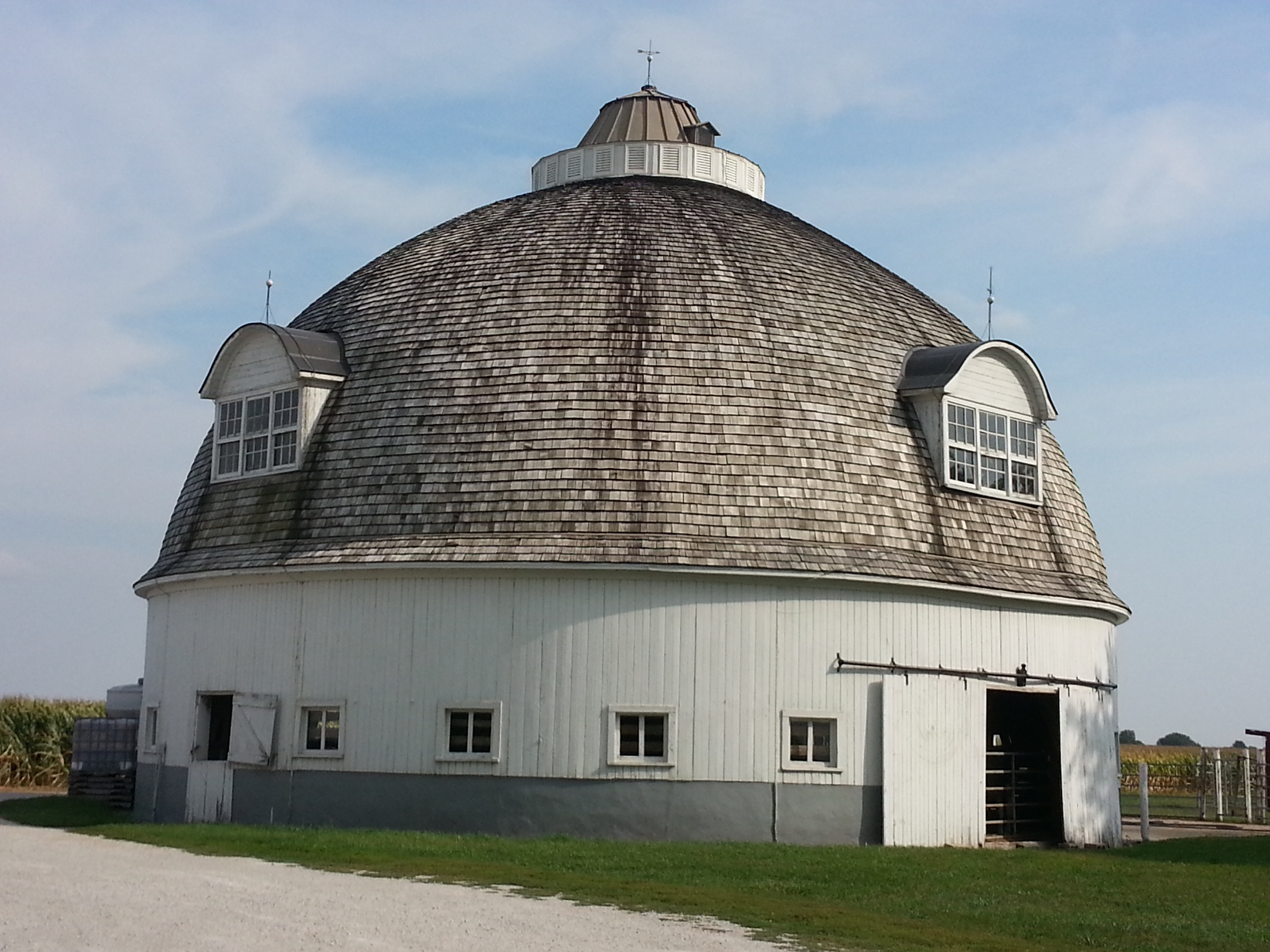

- Location within Illinois Location within the United States
- Location: Livingston County, Illinois
- Nearest city: Pontiac
- Coordinates: 40°50′26″N 88°38′29″W
- Built: 1918
- Built by: McCoy, Jean A.
- Architectural style: Round barns
- MPS: MPL001 - Round Barns in Illinois Thematic Resources
- NRHP reference No.: 82002582
- Added to NRHP: August 26, 1982

The Raymond Schulz Round Barn or Raymond Schultz Round Barn is a round barn in the U.S. state of Illinois. The barn was listed on the U.S. National Register of Historic Places on August 26, 1982, as part of the original Multiple Property Submission, Round Barns in Illinois Thematic Resources.

It is also known as Schultz Round Barn.

The Schulz Barn was built explicitly after its owner viewed the round barns at the University of Illinois Agriculture Experiment Station. Today, those barns make up part of the University of Illinois Experimental Dairy Farm Historic District.
