= Jens Myhre Round Barn =

- U.S. National Register of Historic Places
- Location within North Dakota Location within the United States
- Nearest city: New Rockford, North Dakota
- Coordinates: 47°44′46″N 99°12′11″W
- Area: less than one acre
- Built: 1919
- MPS: North Dakota Round Barns TR
- NRHP reference No.: 86002749
- Added to NRHP: October 1, 1986

The Jens Myhre Round Barn near New Rockford, North Dakota, United States, was a round barn that was built in 1919. It was listed on the National Register of Historic Places in 1986.

According to its National Register nomination, it "is significant for being an extremely intact surviving example of the round barn theme", and "it is the only round barn surviving in the state which employed a ramp to the mow area". Apparently the ramp method for loading the mow was obsolescent due to advent of hay moving slings and tracks as alternatives; this ramp "may have been perceived as out of fashion and behind the times." It had a concrete foundation and wall, which contributes to another paradox in the barn's "apparently conflicting" history.

This barn burned down sometime before 1995 and was removed from the National Register of Historic Places in 2015.
