= Nelson Round Barn =

- U.S. National Register of Historic Places
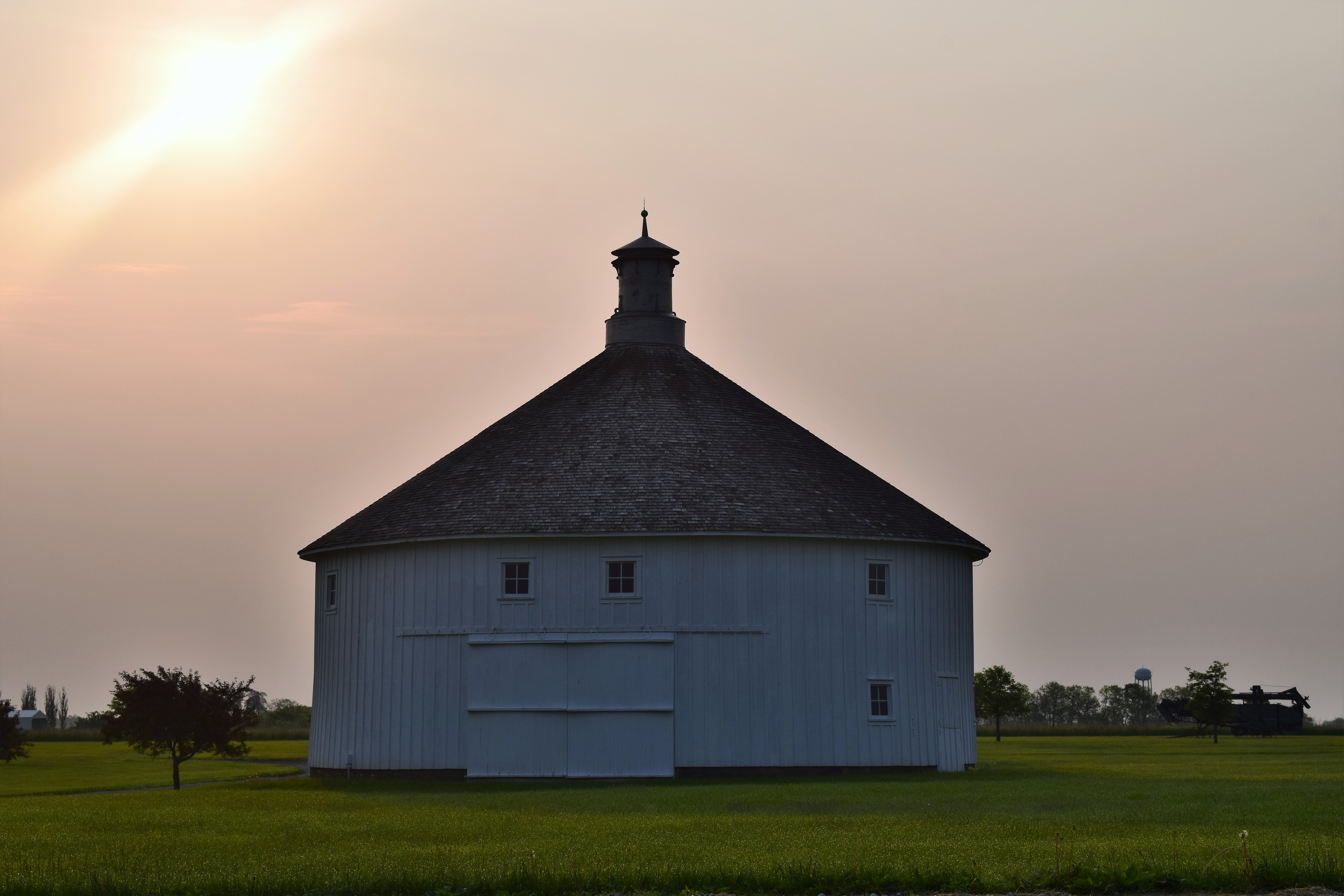

- Location within Iowa Location within the United States
- Location: County Road J46
- Nearest city: Allerton, Iowa
- Coordinates: 40°42′24″N 93°20′44″W
- Area: less than one acre
- Built: 1912
- MPS: Iowa Round Barns: The Sixty Year Experiment TR
- NRHP reference No.: 86003189
- Added to NRHP: November 19, 1986

The Nelson Round Barn is a historic building located near Allerton in rural Wayne County, Iowa, United States. It was built in 1912, and it was originally used as a dairy barn. The building is a true round barn that measures 50 feet (15 m) in diameter. It features white vertical siding, an aerator, and a conical roof. The barn has been listed on the National Register of Historic Places since 1986.
