= Round Barn, Millville Township =

- U.S. National Register of Historic Places
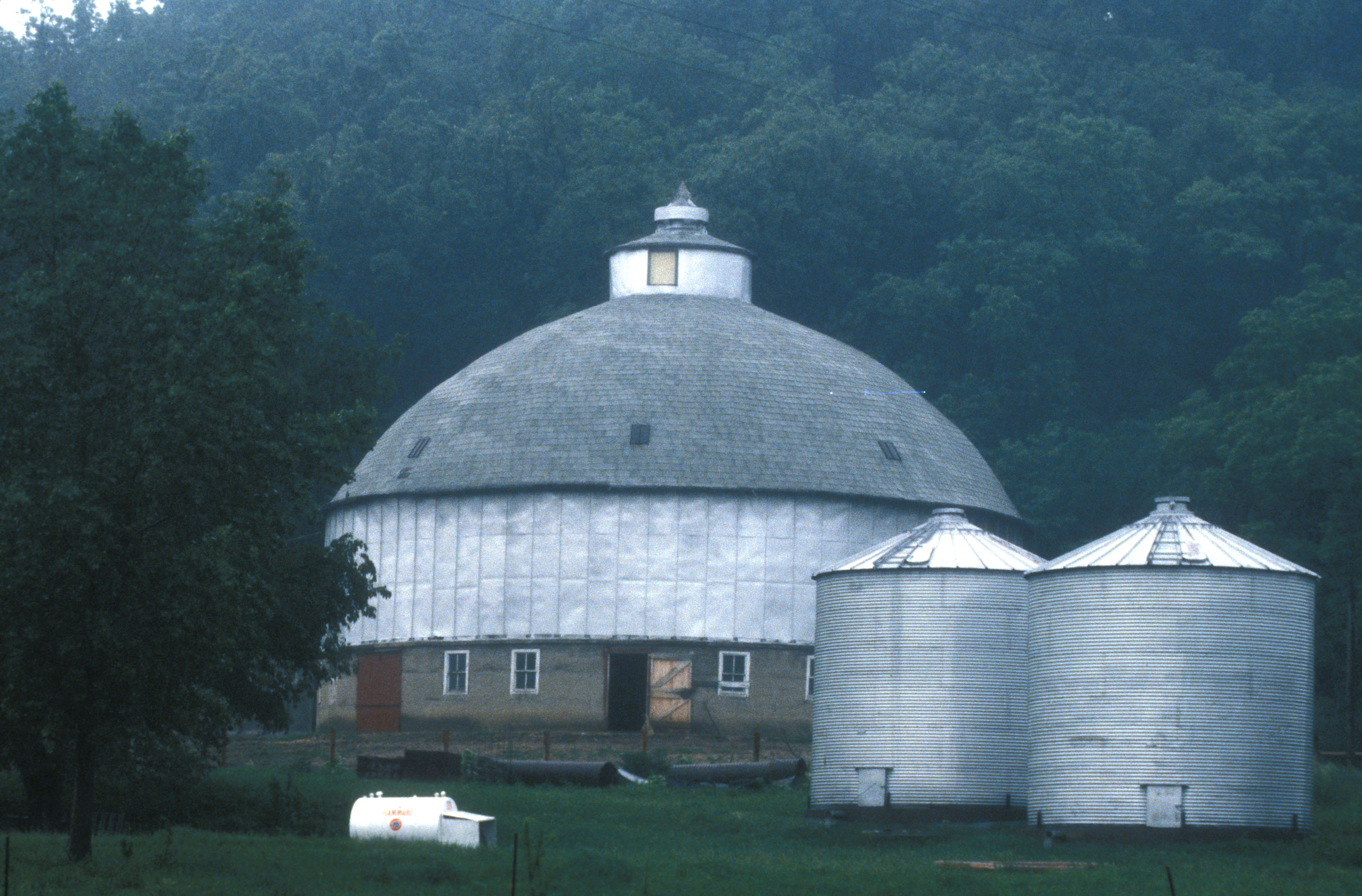
- The barn is located on a farm just outside of Millville

- Location within Iowa Location within the United States
- Location: U.S. Route 52; Millville Township, Clayton County, Iowa
- Coordinates: 42°42′56″N 91°5′4″W
- Built: 1916
- Architect: Xavier Jacque
- MPS: Iowa Round Barns: The Sixty Year Experiment TR
- NRHP reference No.: 86001423
- Added to NRHP: June 30, 1986

The Round Barn, Millville Township is an historical building located near the unincorporated community of Millville in rural Clayton County, Iowa, United States. It was built in 1916 as a general purpose barn. The building is a true round barn that measures 72 feet (22 m) in diameter. It is covered in metal vertical siding and features a dome roof, a cupola with an aerator and a central silo. It is one of three round barns extant in Iowa known to have a dome roof. The barn has been listed on the National Register of Historic Places since 1986.
