= Round Barn (Columbus Grove, Ohio) =

- U.S. National Register of Historic Places
- Location within Ohio Location within the United States
- Nearest city: Columbus Grove, Ohio
- Coordinates: 40°57′0″N 84°11′38″W
- Area: less than one acre
- Built: 1910
- Built by: Mat Unverferth
- Architectural style: Round Barn
- MPS: Round Barns in the Black Swamp of Northwest Ohio TR
- NRHP reference No.: 80003212
- Added to NRHP: April 17, 1980

The Round Barn near Columbus Grove, Ohio, United States, was a round barn that was built in 1910. It was listed on the National Register of Historic Places in 1980.

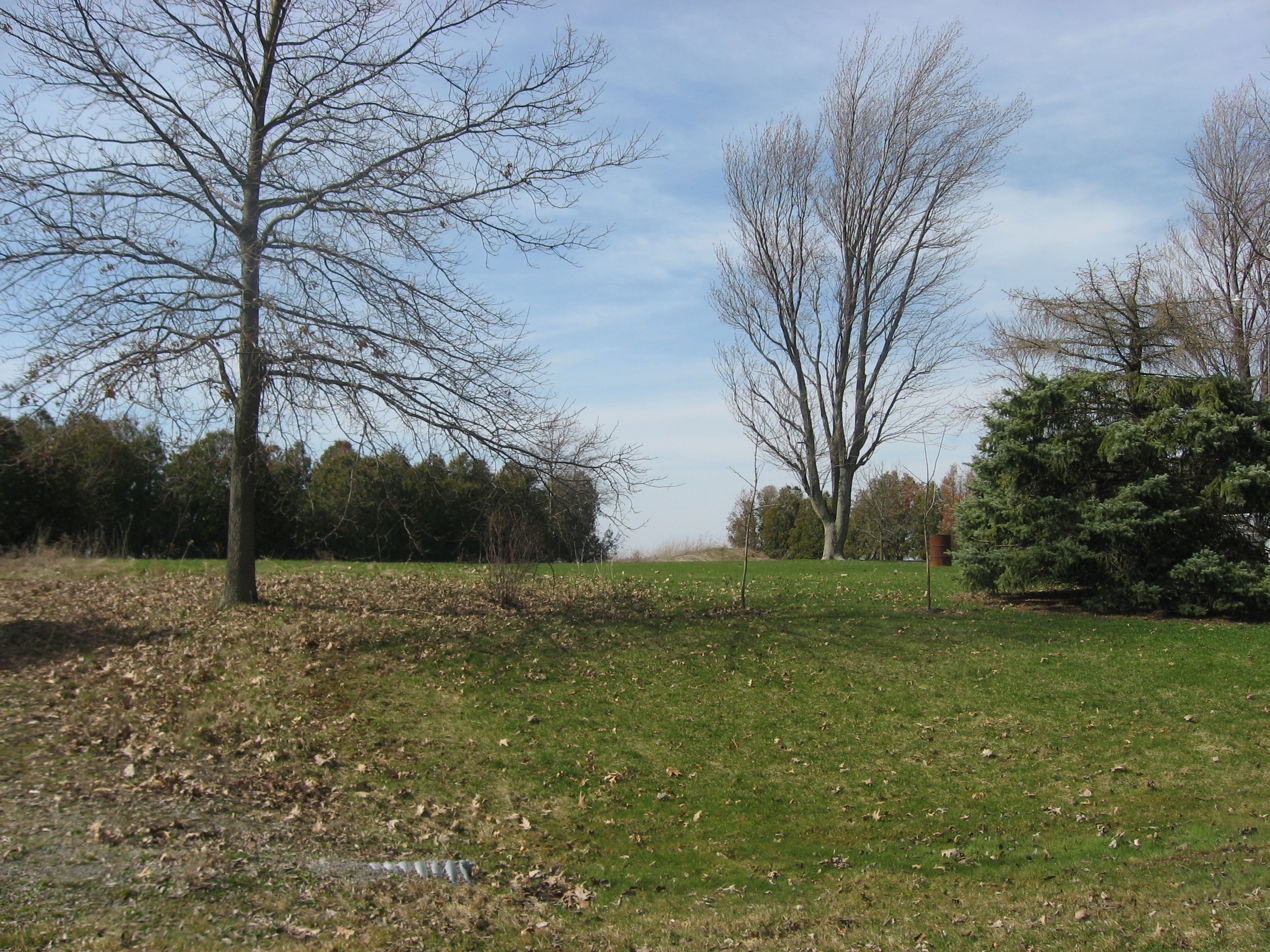
Barn site

The barn has been destroyed.
