= Round Barn (Van Wert, Ohio) =

- U.S. National Register of Historic Places
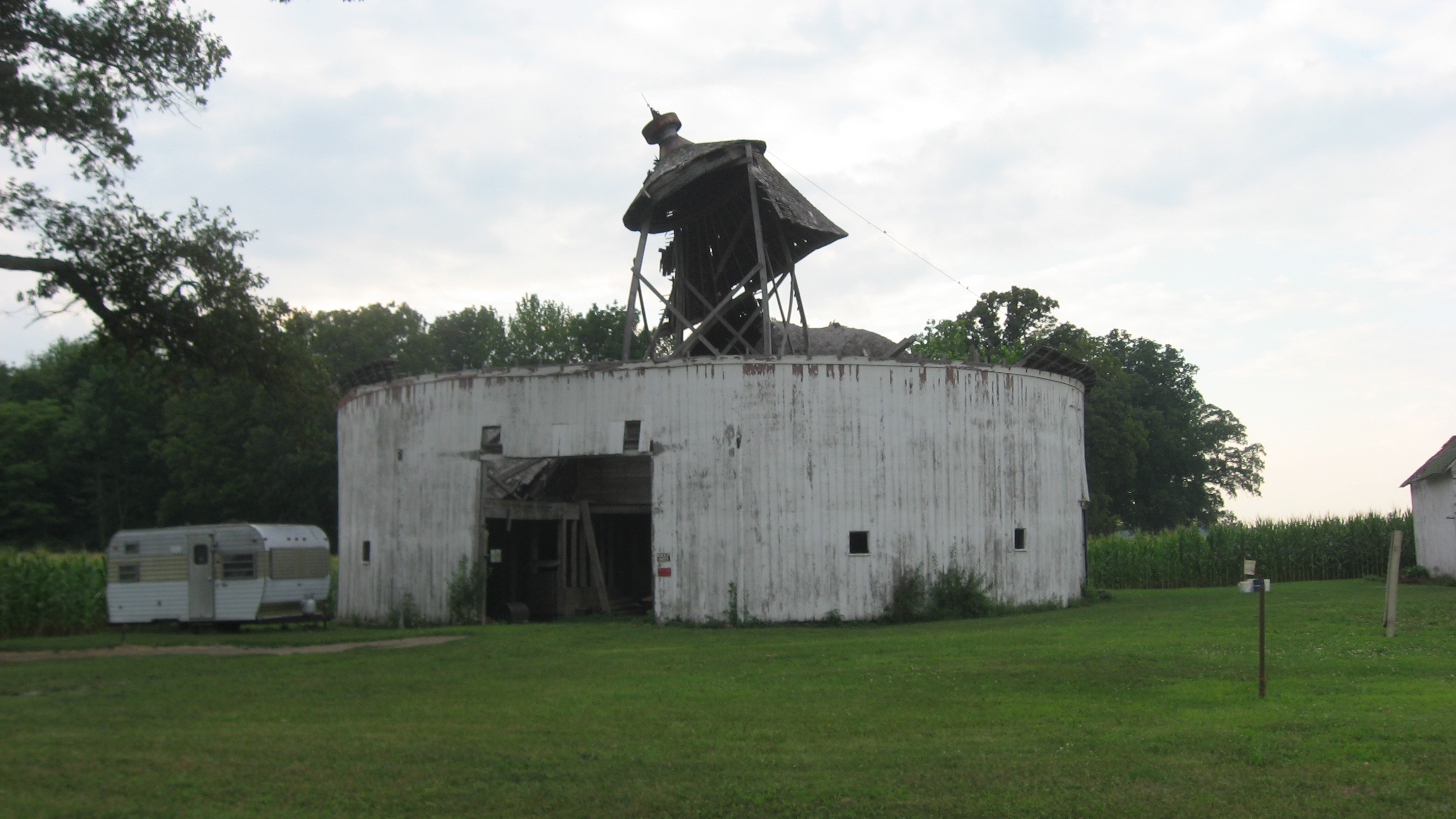
- Barn in dilapidated condition, in 2010

- Location within Ohio Location within the United States
- Nearest city: Van Wert, Ohio
- Coordinates: 40°51′6″N 84°45′46″W
- Area: less than one acre
- Built: 1910
- Built by: Clayton Hoover
- Architectural style: Round Barn
- MPS: Round Barns in the Black Swamp of Northwest Ohio TR
- NRHP reference No.: 80003240
- Added to NRHP: April 17, 1980

The Round Barn near Van Wert, Ohio, United States, is a round barn that was built in 1910. It was listed on the National Register of Historic Places in 1980.

It has a 65-foot (20 m) diameter and a height of 55 feet (17 m).

It may also have been known as the Clayton Hoover Round Barn.
