= Round Barn, Pilot Grove Township =

- U.S. National Register of Historic Places
- Location within Iowa Location within the United States
- Location: County Road H20; Pilot Grove Township, Montgomery County, Iowa
- Coordinates: 41°6′21″N 95°4′50″W
- Area: less than one acre
- Built: 1912
- MPS: Iowa Round Barns: The Sixty Year Experiment TR
- NRHP reference No.: 86001467
- Added to NRHP: June 30, 1986

The Round Barn, Pilot Grove Township is an historical building located in rural Montgomery County, Iowa, United States. It was built in 1912 as a general purpose barn. The building is a true round barn that measures 60 feet (18 m) in diameter. It is the type that was promoted by the Illinois Agricultural Experiment Station. The barn is covered in white vertical siding and features a two-pitch roof, a small dormer on the south side and an 18-foot (5.5 m) central silo. It has been listed on the National Register of Historic Places since 1986.
