= Round Barn, Norway Township =

- U.S. National Register of Historic Places
- Location within Iowa Location within the United States
- Location: Off County Road R60; Norway Township
- Coordinates: 43°29′22.6″N 93°35′53.3″W
- Area: less than one acre
- Built: 1920
- Architect: Emil Cable
- MPS: Iowa Round Barns: The Sixty Year Experiment TR
- NRHP reference No.: 87000507
- Added to NRHP: February 27, 1987

The Round Barn, Norway Township is a historical building located in rural Norway Township, Winnebago County, Iowa, United States. It was built in 1920 as a dairy and horse barn. The building is a true round barn that measures 53 feet (16 m) in diameter. It is constructed of clay tile from the Johnston Brothers' Clay Works in Webster County. It features an aerator, conical roof and a hay dormer on the south side. The barn has been listed on the National Register of Historic Places since 1987.
