= Iowa Center, Iowa =

- Unincorporated community
- Location within Iowa
- Coordinates: 41°55′43″N 93°24′19″W
- Country: United States
- State: Iowa
- County: Story
- Elevation: 948 ft (289 m)
- Time zone: UTC-6 (Central (CST))
  - Summer (DST): UTC-5 (CDT)
- Area code: 515
- GNIS feature ID: 457823

Iowa Center is an unincorporated community in Story County, Iowa, United States.

== Geography ==
Iowa Center is located on County Highway S27, 2.5 miles (4.0 km) north of Maxwell.

== History ==
The population was 30 in 1940.
