= Round Barn, Bruce Township Section 3 =

- U.S. National Register of Historic Places
- Location within Iowa Location within the United States
- Location: Off U.S. Route 218, Bruce Township, Benton County, Iowa
- Coordinates: 42°17′31″N 92°14′8″W
- Area: less than one acre
- Built: 1910
- MPS: Iowa Round Barns: The Sixty Year Experiment TR
- NRHP reference No.: 86001415
- Added to NRHP: June 30, 1986

The Round Barn, Bruce Township Section 3 is located in Bruce Township, Benton County, Iowa, United States. It was built in 1910 for use as a cattle barn. The building is a true round barn that measures 60 feet (18 m) in diameter. The barn is constructed of clay tile and features a conical roof. The structure does not have a cupola, but there is a silo that rises through the center. There is also a round machine shed on the same property. It has been listed on the National Register of Historic Places since 1986.
