= Round Barn, Dubuque Township =

- U.S. National Register of Historic Places
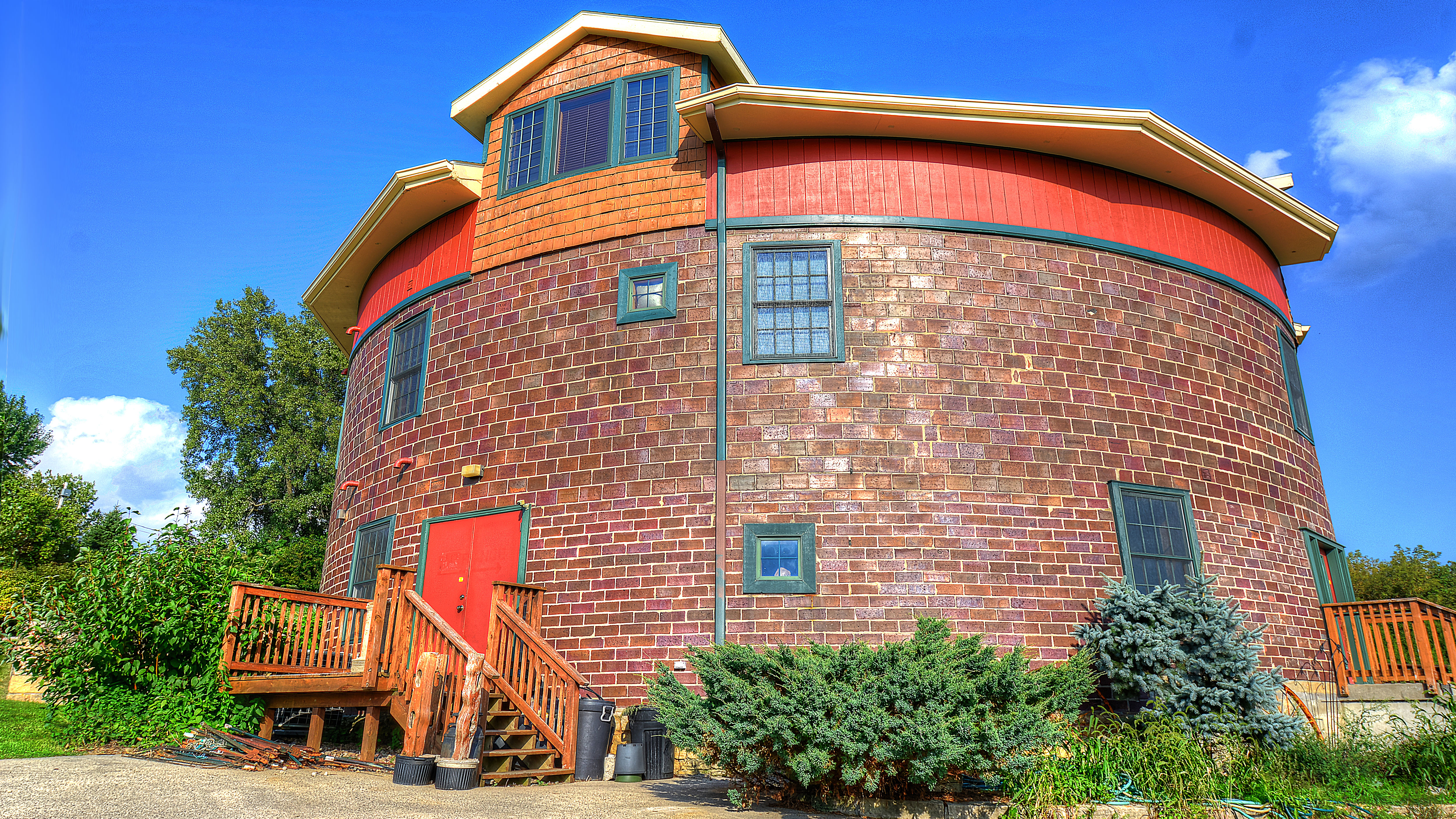

- Location within Iowa Location within the United States
- Location: 2810 Cascade Rd. Dubuque, Iowa
- Coordinates: 42°28′21.5″N 90°42′28.8″W
- Area: less than one acre
- Built: 1915
- MPS: Iowa Round Barns: The Sixty Year Experiment TR
- NRHP reference No.: 86001425
- Added to NRHP: June 30, 1986

The Round Barn, Dubuque Township is a historic building located in Dubuque Township in Dubuque County, Iowa, United States. It was built in 1915 as a dairy barn. The building is a true round barn that measures 60 feet (18 m) in diameter. The structure is constructed in clay tile from the Johnston Brothers' Clay Works and it features a windowed cupola and dormers on the north and west sides.
