= Round Barn, Bruce Township Section 6 =

- Formerly listed on the U.S. National Register of Historic Places
- Location within Iowa Location within the United States
- Location: West of U.S. Route 218, Bruce Township, Benton County, Iowa
- Coordinates: 42°17′13″N 92°16′50″W
- Area: less than one acre
- Built: 1914
- MPS: Iowa Round Barns: The Sixty Year Experiment TR
- NRHP reference No.: 86001416

Significant dates
- Added to NRHP: June 30, 1986
- Removed from NRHP: May 28, 2019

The Round Barn, Bruce Township Section 6 was located in Bruce Township, Benton County, Iowa, United States. It was built in 1914 as a general purpose barn. The building was a true round barn that measured 60 feet (18 m) in diameter. The barn was constructed of clay tile from the Johnston Brothers' Clay Works and it featured a conical roof. The structure did not have a cupola, but there was a silo that rose from the center. It was listed on the National Register of Historic Places (NRHP) in 1986.

The barn has subsequently been torn down. It was removed from the NRHP in 2019.
