= Eagle Center, Iowa =

- Unincorporated community
- Location within Iowa
- Coordinates: 42°20′27″N 92°21′27″W
- Country: United States
- State: Iowa
- County: Black Hawk
- Elevation: 955 ft (291 m)
- Time zone: UTC-6 (Central (CST))
  - Summer (DST): UTC-5 (CDT)
- Area code: 319
- GNIS feature ID: 456089

Eagle Center is an unincorporated community in Black Hawk County, Iowa, United States. Eagle Center is located at the junction of County Highways D46 and V27, 10.5 miles (16.9 km) south of Waterloo.

== History ==
Eagle Center's population was 63 in 1902.
