= Round Barn, Washington Township (Sciola, Iowa) =

- U.S. National Register of Historic Places
- Location within Iowa Location within the United States
- Location: U.S. Route 71
- Nearest city: Sciola, Iowa
- Coordinates: 41°3′39″N 94°59′1″W
- Area: less than one acre
- Built: 1917
- MPS: Iowa Round Barns: The Sixty Year Experiment TR
- NRHP reference No.: 86001466
- Added to NRHP: June 30, 1986

The Round Barn, Washington Township is a historic building located near Sciola in rural Montgomery County, Iowa, United States. It was built in 1917 as a hog barn. Typical of a barn built for this use in features a multitude of windows on the wall and on the cupola, which provided light and ventilation. The building is a 24-sided structure that measures 60 feet (18 m) in diameter. The barn features red vertical siding, a 12-section cupola, and a two-pitch sectional roof. It has been listed on the National Register of Historic Places since 1986.
