= Alworth, Illinois =

- Unincorporated community
- Location within Illinois Location within the United States
- Coordinates: 42°14′37″N 89°14′44″W
- Country: United States
- State: Illinois
- County: Winnebago
- Elevation: 899 ft (274 m)
- Time zone: UTC-6 (Central (CST))
  - Summer (DST): UTC-5 (CDT)
- Zip code: 61003
- Area codes: 815 & 779
- GNIS feature ID: 422405

Alworth is an unincorporated community in Winnebago Township, Winnebago County, Illinois, United States. Alworth is located on County Route 16 and the Canadian National Railway 1.6 miles (2.6 km) south of Winnebago.
