= Merle K. Anderson =

American farmer and politician

Merle K. Anderson (March 22, 1904 – January 18, 1982) was an American farmer and politician.

Anderson was born in Laona Township, Winnebago County, Illinois. He went to the Winnebago County Public Schools and to Luther College, in Decorah, Iowa. He was a farmer and raised cattle. Anderson served on the Winnebago County Board of Supervisors and was the president of the county board. He was a Republican. Anderson served in the Illinois House of Representatives from 1963 to 1965 and from 1965 to 1975. Anderson died at Medina Nursing Home in Durand, Illinois.
