= Burritt Township, Illinois =

Coordinates: 42°19′55″N 89°13′47″W

Burritt Township
- Township
- Location in Winnebago County
- Country: United States
- State: Illinois
- County: Winnebago

Government
  - Supervisor: Dennis Daly

Area
  - Total: 32.65 sq mi (84.6 km^{2})
  - Land: 32.51 sq mi (84.2 km^{2})
  - Water: 0.14 sq mi (0.36 km^{2}) 0.43%

Population (2010)
  - Estimate (2016): 923
  - Density: 29.1/sq mi (11.2/km^{2})
- Time zone: UTC-6 (CST)
  - Summer (DST): UTC-5 (CDT)
- FIPS code: 17-201-09915

Burritt Township is located in Winnebago County, Illinois, United States. As of the 2010 census, its population was 947 and it contained 388 housing units. It contains part of the census-designated place of Westlake Village.

== Geography ==
According to the 2010 census, the township has a total area of 32.65 square miles (84.6 km^{2}), of which 32.51 square miles (84.2 km^{2}) (or 99.57%) is land and 0.14 square miles (0.36 km^{2}) (or 0.43%) is water.

== Demographics ==
Historical population
Census	Pop.	Note	%±
2016 (est.)	923
U.S. Decennial Census
