= Durand Township =

Durand Township may refer to the following townships in the United States:

- Durand Township, Winnebago County, Illinois
- Durand Township, Beltrami County, Minnesota
