= Laona Township, Illinois =

Laona Township
- Township
- Location in Winnebago County
- Coordinates: 42°28′23″N 89°19′32″W
- Country: United States
- State: Illinois
- County: Winnebago
- Established: November 6, 1849

Government
  - Supervisor: J. Ronald Waldschmidt

Area
  - Total: 27.4 sq mi (71 km^{2})
  - Land: 27.12 sq mi (70.2 km^{2})
  - Water: 0.28 sq mi (0.73 km^{2}) 1.02%
- Elevation: 876 ft (267 m)

Population (2010)
  - Estimate (2016): 1,218
  - Density: 46.1/sq mi (17.8/km^{2})
- Time zone: UTC-6 (CST)
  - Summer (DST): UTC-5 (CDT)
- FIPS code: 17-201-42054

Laona Township is located in Winnebago County, Illinois. As of the 2010 census, it had a population of 1,250 and contained 707 housing units. The township includes part of the census-designated place of Lake Summerset.

== Geography ==
According to the 2010 census, the township had a total area of 27.4 square miles (71 km^{2}), of which 27.12 square miles (70.2 km^{2}) (or 98.98%) is land and 0.28 square miles (0.73 km^{2}) (or 1.02%) is water.

== Demographics ==
Historical population
Census	Pop.	Note	%±
2016 (est.)	1,218
U.S. Decennial Census

== Notable people ==
- Merle K. Anderson (1904–1982), farmer and Illinois state representative, was born in Laona Township.
- Ellen Gates Starr (1859-1940), social reformer and activist, born in Laona Township.
