= Pecatonica Township, Illinois =

Pecatonica Township
- Township
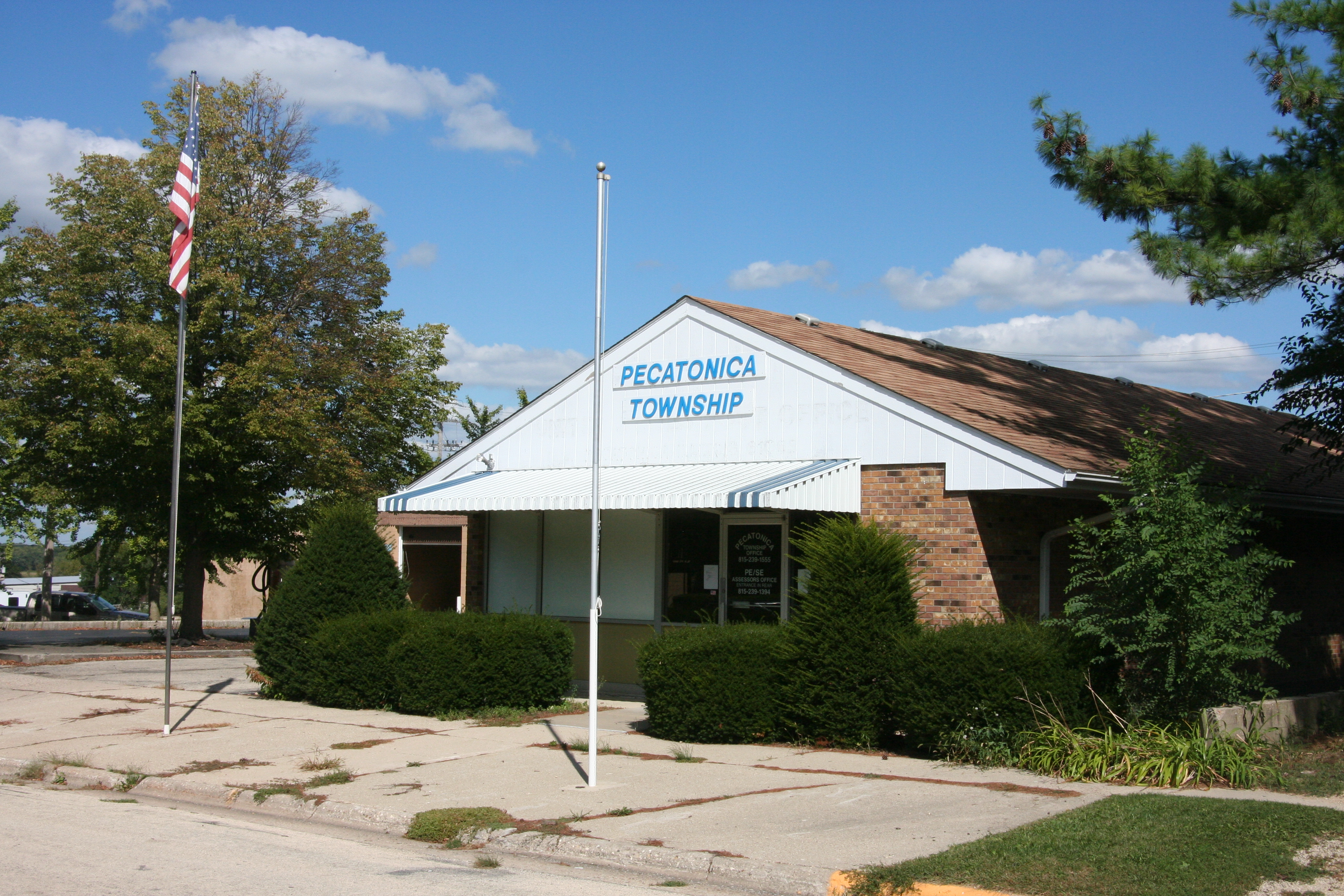
- Town hall

- Location in Winnebago County
- Coordinates: 42°19′57″N 89°20′22″W
- Country: United States
- State: Illinois
- County: Winnebago
- Established: November 6, 1849

Government
  - Supervisor: Greg Deppe

Area
  - Total: 35.49 sq mi (91.9 km^{2})
  - Land: 35.13 sq mi (91.0 km^{2})
  - Water: 0.36 sq mi (0.93 km^{2}) 1.01%
- Elevation: 728 ft (222 m)

Population (2010)
  - Estimate (2016): 4,198
  - Density: 124/sq mi (48/km^{2})
- Time zone: UTC-6 (CST)
  - Summer (DST): UTC-5 (CDT)
- FIPS code: 17-201-58421

Pecatonica Township is located in Winnebago County, Illinois. As of the 2010 census, its population was 4,355 and it contained 1,750 housing units. It contains part of the census-designated place of Westlake Village.

== Geography ==
According to the 2010 census, the township has a total area of 35.49 square miles (91.9 km^{2}), of which 35.13 square miles (91.0 km^{2}) (or 98.99%) is land and 0.36 square miles (0.93 km^{2}) (or 1.01%) is water.

== Demographics ==
Historical population
Census	Pop.	Note	%±
2016 (est.)	4,198
U.S. Decennial Census

== Points of Interest ==
Pecatonica Township contains the Pecatonica Wetlands Forest Preserve, a county park.
