= Westlake Village, Illinois =

- Census-designated place
- Location within Illinois Location within the United States
- Coordinates: 42°18′40″N 89°17′26″W
- Country: USA
- State: Illinois
- County: Winnebago
- Townships: Pecatonica; Burritt

Area
  - Total: 1.05 sq mi (2.72 km^{2})
  - Land: 0.92 sq mi (2.39 km^{2})
  - Water: 0.13 sq mi (0.33 km^{2})
- Elevation: 804 ft (245 m)

Population (2020)
  - Total: 1,493
  - Density: 1,620.7/sq mi (625.75/km^{2})
- Time zone: UTC-6 (Central (CST))
  - Summer (DST): UTC-5 (CDT)
- ZIP Code: 61088 (Winnebago)
- Area codes: 815, 779
- FIPS code: 17-80570
- GNIS feature ID: 2806583

Westlake Village is a census-designated place (CDP) in Winnebago County, Illinois, United States. It is in the western part of the county, in the southeast part of Pecatonica Township, with a small portion extending east into Burritt Township. It is built around a golf course and a small reservoir (Westlake) on Coolidge Creek. It is 5 miles (8 km) northwest of the village of Winnebago and 11 miles (18 km) west-northwest of the city of Rockford.

As of the 2020 census, Westlake Village had a population of 1,493.

Westlake Village was first listed as a CDP prior to the 2020 census.

== Demographics ==
Historical population
Census	Pop.	Note	%±
2020	1,493		—
U.S. Decennial Census

Westlake Village first appeared as a census designated place in the 2020 U.S. census.

=== 2020 census ===
As of the 2020 census, Westlake Village had a population of 1,493. The median age was 41.2 years. 28.5% of residents were under the age of 18 and 15.1% of residents were 65 years of age or older. For every 100 females there were 90.4 males, and for every 100 females age 18 and over there were 90.7 males age 18 and over.

0.0% of residents lived in urban areas, while 100.0% lived in rural areas.

There were 500 households in Westlake Village, of which 35.6% had children under the age of 18 living in them. Of all households, 76.8% were married-couple households, 10.2% were households with a male householder and no spouse or partner present, and 9.6% were households with a female householder and no spouse or partner present. About 11.2% of all households were made up of individuals and 6.0% had someone living alone who was 65 years of age or older.

There were 516 housing units, of which 3.1% were vacant. The homeowner vacancy rate was 0.8% and the rental vacancy rate was 50.0%.

Racial composition as of the 2020 census
Race	Number	Percent
White	1,339	89.7%
Black or African American	25	1.7%
American Indian and Alaska Native	6	0.4%
Asian	14	0.9%
Native Hawaiian and Other Pacific Islander	0	0.0%
Some other race	30	2.0%
Two or more races	79	5.3%
Hispanic or Latino (of any race)	77	5.2%

== Education ==
It is in the Pecatonica Community Unit School District 321.
