= Rock Grove Township =

Rock Grove Township may refer to the following townships in the United States:

- Rock Grove Township, Stephenson County, Illinois
- Rock Grove Township, Floyd County, Iowa
