= Jane Addams =

American activist and reformer (1860–1935)

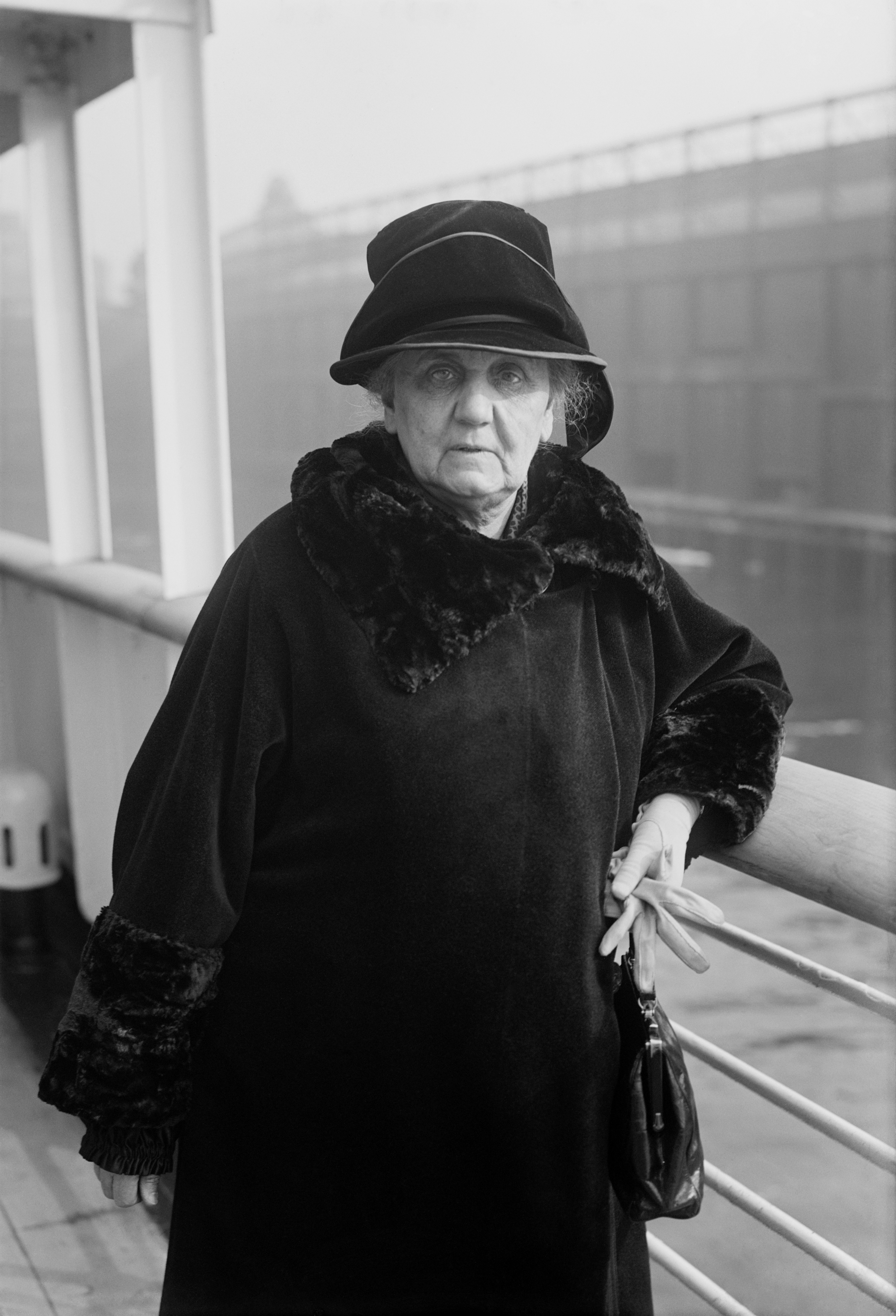
- Addams c. 1926
- Born: Laura Jane Addams; September 6, 1860; Cedarville, Illinois, U.S.
- Died: May 21, 1935 (aged 74); Chicago, Illinois, U.S.
- Education: Rockford Female Seminary
- Occupations: Social worker and political activist; author and lecturer; community organizer; public intellectual
- Father: John H. Addams
- Relatives: Alice Haldeman (sister); James Weber Linn (nephew)
- Awards: Nobel Peace Prize (1931) (shared with Nicholas Murray Butler)

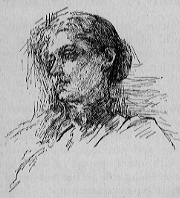
Portrait of Jane Addams, from a charcoal drawing in 1892 by Alice Kellogg Tyler. Source: Addams: Twenty Years at Hull House (1910), p. 114

Laura Jane Addams (September 6, 1860 – May 21, 1935) was an American settlement activist, reformer, social worker, sociologist, public administrator, philosopher, and author. She was a leader in the history of social work and women's suffrage. In 1889, Addams co-founded Hull House, one of America's most famous settlement houses, in Chicago, Illinois, providing extensive social services to poor, largely immigrant families. Philosophically a "radical pragmatist", she was arguably the first woman public philosopher in the United States. In the Progressive Era, when even presidents such as Theodore Roosevelt and Woodrow Wilson identified themselves as reformers and might be seen as social activists, Addams was one of the most prominent reformers.

An advocate for world peace, and recognized as the founder of the social work profession in the United States, in 1931 Addams became the first American woman to be awarded the Nobel Peace Prize; she shared the win with Nicholas Murray Butler. Earlier, Addams was awarded an honorary Master of Arts degree from Yale University in 1910, becoming the first woman to receive an honorary degree from the school. In 1920, she was a co-founder of the American Civil Liberties Union (ACLU).

Addams helped America address and focus on issues that were of concern to mothers, as well as the domestic work assigned to women, such as the needs of children, local public health, and world peace. In her essay "Utilization of Women in City Government", Addams noted the connection between the workings of government and the household, stating that many departments of government, such as sanitation and the schooling of children, could be traced back to traditional women's roles in the private sphere. When she died in 1935, Addams was the best-known female public figure in the United States.

== Biography ==
=== Early life and education ===
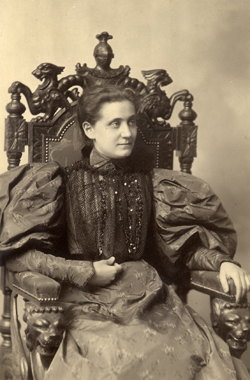
Jane Addams as a young woman, undated studio portrait by Cox, Chicago

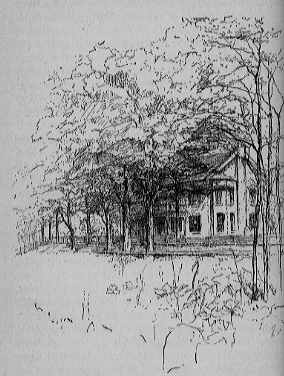
Birthplace of Jane Addams in Cedarville, Illinois. Source Addams: Twenty Years at Hull House (1910), in the public domain.

Born in Cedarville, Illinois, Jane Addams was the youngest of eight children born into a prosperous northern Illinois family of English-American descent which traced back to colonial Pennsylvania. In 1863, when Addams was two years old, her mother, Sarah Addams (née Weber), died while pregnant with her ninth child. Thereafter Addams was cared for mostly by her older sisters. By the time Addams was eight, four of her siblings had died: three in infancy and one at the age of 16.

Addams spent her childhood playing outdoors, reading indoors, and attending Sunday school. When she was four she contracted tuberculosis of the spine, known as Potts's disease, which caused a curvature in her spine and lifelong health problems. This made it complicated as a child to function with the other children, considering she had a limp and could not run as well. As a child, she thought she was ugly and later remembered wanting not to embarrass her father, when he was dressed in his Sunday best, by walking down the street with him.

Jane Addams adored her father, John H. Addams, when she was a child, as she made clear in the stories in her memoir, Twenty Years at Hull House (1910). He was a founding member of the Illinois Republican Party, served as an Illinois State Senator (1855–1870), and supported his friend Abraham Lincoln in his candidacies for senator (1854) and the presidency (1860). He kept a letter from Lincoln in his desk, and Addams loved to look at it as a child. Her father was an agricultural businessman with large timber, cattle, and agricultural holdings; flour and timber mills and a wool factory. He was the president of The Second National Bank of Freeport, Illinois. He remarried in 1868 when Addams was eight years old. His second wife was Anna Hosteler Haldeman, the widow of a miller in Freeport.

During her childhood, Addams had big dreams of doing something useful in the world. As a voracious reader, she became interested in the poor from her reading of Charles Dickens. Inspired by his works and by her own mother's kindness to the Cedarville poor, Addams decided to become a doctor so that she could live and work among the poor.

Addams's father encouraged her to pursue higher education but close to home. She was eager to attend the new college for women, Smith College in Massachusetts, but her father required her to attend nearby Rockford Female Seminary (now Rockford University), in Rockford, Illinois.

Her experience at Rockford put her in the first wave of U.S. women to receive a college education. She excelled in this all-women environment. She edited the college newspaper, was the valedictorian, participated in the debate club and led the class of 1881. Addams recognized that she and others who were engaged in post-secondary education would have new opportunities and challenges. She expressed this in Bread Givers (1880), a speech she gave during her junior year. She noted the "change which has taken place ... in the ambition and aspirations of women." In the process of developing their intellect and direct labor, something new was emerging. Educated women of her generation wished "not to be a man nor like a man" but claimed "the same right to independent thought and action." Each young woman was gaining "a new confidence in her possibilities, and a fresher hope in her steady progress." At 20, Addams recognized a changing cultural environment and was learning the skills at Rockford to lead the future settlement movement.

Whilst at Rockford, her readings of Thomas Carlyle, John Ruskin, Leo Tolstoy and others became significant influences. After graduating from Rockford in 1881, with a collegiate certificate and membership in Phi Beta Kappa, she still hoped to attend Smith to earn a proper B.A. That summer, her father died unexpectedly from a sudden case of appendicitis. Each child inherited roughly $50,000 (equivalent to $1.67 million in 2016).

That fall, Addams, her sister Alice, Alice's husband Harry, and their stepmother, Anna Haldeman Addams, moved to Philadelphia so that the three young people could pursue medical educations. Harry was already trained in medicine and did further studies at the University of Pennsylvania. Jane and Alice completed their first year of medical school at the Woman's Medical College of Pennsylvania, but Jane's health problems, a spinal operation and a nervous breakdown prevented her from completing the degree. She was filled with sadness at her failure. Her stepmother Anna was also ill, so the entire family canceled their plans to stay two years and returned to Cedarville. her brother-in-law Harry performed surgery on her back, to straighten it. He then advised that she not pursue studies but, instead, travel. In August 1883, she set off for a two-year tour of Europe with her stepmother, traveling some of the time with friends and family who joined them. Addams decided that she did not have to become a doctor to be able to help the poor.

Upon her return home in June 1887, she lived with her stepmother in Cedarville and spent winters with her in Baltimore. Addams, still filled with vague ambition, sank into depression, unsure of her future and feeling useless leading the conventional life expected of a well-to-do young woman. She wrote long letters to her friend from Rockford Seminary, Ellen Gates Starr, mostly about Christianity and books but sometimes about her despair.

Her nephew was James Weber Linn (1876–1939) who taught English at the University of Chicago and served in the Illinois General Assembly. Linn also wrote books and newspaper articles.

=== Settlement house ===
Meanwhile, Addams gathered inspiration from what she read. Fascinated by the early Christians and Tolstoy's book My Religion, she was baptized a Christian in the Cedarville Presbyterian Church in the summer of 1886. Reading Giuseppe Mazzini's Duties of Man, she began to be inspired by the idea of democracy as a social ideal. Yet she felt confused about her role as a woman. John Stuart Mill's The Subjection of Women made her question the social pressures on a woman to marry and devote her life to family.

In the summer of 1887, Addams read in a magazine about the new idea of starting a settlement house. She decided to visit the world's first, Toynbee Hall, in London. She and several friends, including Ellen Gates Starr, traveled in Europe from December 1887 through the summer of 1888. After watching a bullfight in Madrid, fascinated by what she saw as an exotic tradition, Addams condemned this fascination and her inability to feel outraged at the suffering of the horses and bulls. At first, Addams told no one about her dream to start a settlement house, but, she felt increasingly guilty for not acting on her dream. Believing that sharing her dream might help her to act on it, she told Ellen Gates Starr. Starr loved the idea and agreed to join Addams in starting a settlement house.

Addams and another friend traveled to London without Starr, who was busy. Visiting Toynbee Hall, Addams was enchanted. She described it as "a community of University men who live there, have their recreation clubs and society all among the poor people, yet, in the same style in which they would live in their own circle. It is so free of 'professional doing good,' so unaffectedly sincere and so productive of good results in its classes and libraries seems perfectly ideal." Addams's dream of the classes mingling socially to mutual benefit, as they had in early Christian circles seemed embodied in the new type of institution.

The settlement house as Addams discovered was a space within which unexpected cultural connections could be made and where the narrow boundaries of culture, class, and education could be expanded. They doubled as community arts centers and social service facilities. They laid the foundations for American civil society, a neutral space within which different communities and ideologies could learn from each other and seek common grounds for collective action. The role of the settlement house was an "unending effort to make culture and 'the issue of things' go together." The unending effort was the story of her own life, a struggle to reinvigorate her own culture by reconnecting with diversity and conflict of the immigrant communities in America's cities and with the necessities of social reform.

=== Hull House ===
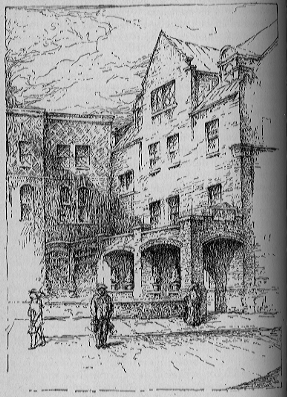
Main entrance to Hull House. Source Addams: Twenty Years at Hull House (1910), p.128

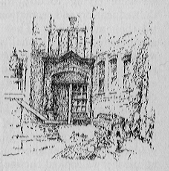
A Doorway in Hull House Court. Source Addams: Twenty Years at Hull House (1910), p.149

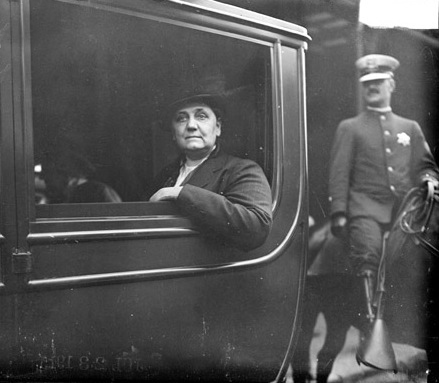
Jane Addams, 1915

In 1889 Addams and her college friend and paramour Ellen Gates Starr co-founded Hull House, a settlement house in Chicago. The run-down mansion had been built by Charles Hull in 1856 and needed repairs and upgrading. Addams at first paid for all of the capital expenses (repairing the roof of the porch, repainting the rooms, buying furniture) and most of the operating costs. However gifts from individuals supported the House beginning in its first year and Addams was able to reduce the proportion of her contributions, although the annual budget grew rapidly. Some wealthy women became long-term donors to the House, including Helen Culver, who managed her first cousin Charles Hull's estate, and who eventually allowed the contributors to use the house rent-free. Other contributors were Louise DeKoven Bowen, Mary Rozet Smith, Mary Wilmarth, and others.

Addams and Starr were the first two occupants of the house, which would later become the residence of about 25 women. At its height, Hull House was visited each week by some 2,000 people. Hull House was a center for research, empirical analysis, study, and debate, as well as a pragmatic center for living in and establishing good relations with the neighborhood. Among the aims of Hull House was to give privileged, educated young people contact with the real life of the majority of the population. Residents of Hull House conducted investigations on housing, midwifery, fatigue, tuberculosis, typhoid, garbage collection, cocaine, and truancy. The core Hull House residents were well-educated women bound together by their commitment to labour unions, the National Consumers League and the suffrage movement. Dr. Harriett Alleyne Rice joined Hull House to provide medical treatment for poor families. Its facilities included a night school for adults, clubs for older children, a public kitchen, an art gallery, a gym, a girls' club, a bathhouse, a book bindery, a music school, a drama group and a theater, apartments, a library, meeting rooms for discussion, clubs, an employment bureau, and a lunchroom. Her adult night school was a forerunner of the continuing education classes offered by many universities today. In addition to making available social services and cultural events for the largely immigrant population of the neighborhood, Hull House afforded an opportunity for young social workers to acquire training. Eventually, Hull House became a 13-building settlement complex, which included a playground and a summer camp (known as Bowen Country Club).

One aspect of the Hull House that was very important to Jane Addams was the Art Program. The art program at Hull House allowed Addams to challenge the system of industrialized education, which "fitted" the individual to a specific job or position. She wanted the house to provide a space, time and tools to encourage people to think independently. She saw art as the key to unlocking the diversity of the city through collective interaction, mutual self-discovery, recreation and the imagination. Art was integral to her vision of community, disrupting fixed ideas and stimulating the diversity and interaction on which a healthy society depends, based on a continual rewriting of cultural identities through variation and interculturalism.

With funding from Edward Butler, Addams opened an art exhibition and studio space as one of the first additions to Hull House. On the first floor of the new addition there was a branch of the Chicago Public Library, and the second was the Butler Art Gallery, which featured recreations of famous artwork as well as the work of local artists. Studio space within the art gallery provided both Hull House residents and the entire community with the opportunity to take art classes or to come in and hone their craft whenever they liked. As Hull House grew, and the relationship with the neighborhood deepened, that opportunity became less of a comfort to the poor and more of an outlet of expression and exchange of different cultures and diverse communities. Art and culture was becoming a bigger and more important part of the lives of immigrants within the 19th ward, and soon children caught on to the trend. These working-class children were offered instruction in all forms and levels of art. Places such as the Butler Art Gallery or the Bowen Country Club often hosted these classes, but more informal lessons would often be taught outdoors. Addams, with the help of Ellen Gates Starr, founded the Chicago Public School Art Society (CPSAS) in response to the positive reaction the art classes for children caused. The CPSAS provided public schools with reproductions of world-renowned pieces of art, hired artists to teach children how to create art, and also took the students on field trips to Chicago's many art museums.

==== Near west side neighborhood ====
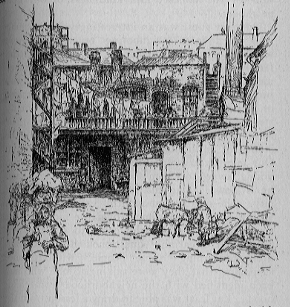
Polk Street opposite Hull House. Source Addams: Twenty Years at Hull House (1910), p.95

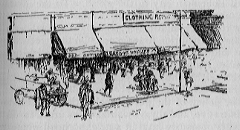
South Halsted Street opposite Hull House. Source Addams: Twenty Years at Hull House. (1910), p. 96

The Hull House neighborhood was a mix of European ethnic groups that had immigrated to Chicago around the start of the 20th century. That mix was the ground where Hull House's inner social and philanthropic elitists tested their theories and challenged the establishment. The ethnic mix is recorded by the Bethlehem-Howard Neighborhood Center: "Germans and Jews resided south of that inner core (south of Twelfth Street) ... The Greek delta formed by Harrison, Halsted Street, and Blue Island Streets served as a buffer to the Irish residing to the north and the French Canadians to the northwest." Italians resided within the inner core of the Hull House Neighborhood ... from the river on the east end, on out to the western ends of what came to be known as Little Italy. Greeks and Jews, along with the remnants of other immigrant groups, began their exodus from the neighborhood in the early 20th century. Only Italians continued as an intact and thriving community through the Great Depression, World War II, and well beyond the ultimate d three "ethical principles" for social settlements: "to teach by example, to practice cooperation, and to practice social democracy, that is, egalitarian, or democratic, social relations across class lines." Thus Hull House offered a comprehensive program of civic, cultural, recreational, and educational activities and attracted admiring visitors from all over the world, including William Lyon Mackenzie King, a graduate student from Harvard University who later became prime minister of Canada. In the 1890s Julia Lathrop, Florence Kelley, and other residents of the house made it a world center of social reform activity. Hull House used the latest methodology (pioneering in statistical mapping) to study overcrowding, truancy, typhoid fever, cocaine, children's reading, newsboys, infant mortality, and midwifery. Starting with efforts to improve the immediate neighborhood, the Hull House group became involved in city and statewide campaigns for better housing, improvements in public welfare, stricter child-labor laws, and protection of working women. Addams brought in prominent visitors from around the world and had close links with leading Chicago intellectuals and philanthropists. In 1912, she helped start the new Progressive Party and supported the presidential campaign of Theodore Roosevelt.

"Addams' philosophy combined feminist sensibilities with an unwavering commitment to social improvement through cooperative efforts. Although she sympathized with feminists, socialists, and pacifists, Addams refused to be labeled. This refusal was pragmatic rather than ideological."

==== Emphasis on children ====
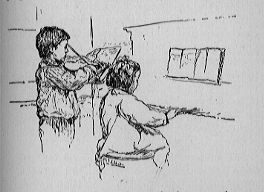
In the Hull House Music School. Source Addams: Twenty Years at Hull House (1910), p. 383

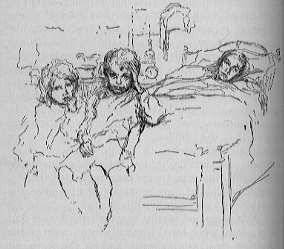
In a Tenement House, Sick Mother and Children. Source Addams: Twenty Years at Hull House (1910), p. 164

Hull House stressed the importance of the role of children in the Americanization process of new immigrants. This philosophy also fostered the play movement and the research and service fields of leisure, youth, and human services. Addams argued in The Spirit of Youth and the City Streets (1909) that play and recreation programs are needed because cities are destroying the spirit of youth. Hull House featured multiple programs in art and drama, kindergarten classes, boys' and girls' clubs, language classes, reading groups, college extension courses, along with public baths, a gymnasium, a labor museum and playground, all within a free-speech atmosphere. They were all designed to foster democratic cooperation, collective action and downplay individualism. She helped pass the first model tenement code and the first factory laws.

Along with her colleagues from Hull House, in 1901 Jane Addams founded what would become the Juvenile Protective Association. JPA provided the first probation officers for the first Juvenile Court in the United States until this became a government function. From 1907 until the 1940s, JPA engaged in many studies examining such subjects as racism, child labor and exploitation, drug abuse and prostitution in Chicago and their effects on child development. Through the years, their mission has now become improving the social and emotional well-being and functioning of vulnerable children so they can reach their fullest potential at home, in school, and in their communities.

==== Documenting social illnesses ====
Addams and her colleagues documented the communal geography of typhoid fever and reported that poor workers were bearing the brunt of the illness. She identified the political corruption and business avarice that caused the city bureaucracy to ignore health, sanitation, and building codes. Linking environmental justice and municipal reform, she eventually defeated the bosses and fostered a more equitable distribution of city services and modernized inspection practices. Addams spoke of the "undoubted powers of public recreation to bring together the classes of a community in the keeping them apart." Addams worked with the Chicago Board of Health and served as the first vice-president of the Playground Association of America.

==== Emphasis on prostitution ====
In 1912, Addams published A New Conscience and Ancient Evil, about prostitution. This book was extremely popular. Addams believed that prostitution was a result of kidnapping only. Her book later inspired Stella Wynne Herron's 1916 short story Shoes, which Lois Weber adapted into a groundbreaking 1916 film of the same name.

==== Feminine ideals ====
Addams and her colleagues originally intended Hull House as a transmission device to bring the values of the college-educated high culture to the masses, including the Efficiency Movement, a major movement in industrial nations in the early 20th century that sought to identify and eliminate waste in the economy and society, and to develop and implement best practices. However, over time, the focus changed from bringing art and culture to the neighborhood (as evidenced in the construction of the Butler Building) to responding to the needs of the community by providing childcare, educational opportunities, and large meeting spaces. Hull House became more than a proving ground for the new generation of college-educated, professional women: it also became part of the community in which it was founded, and its development reveals a shared history.

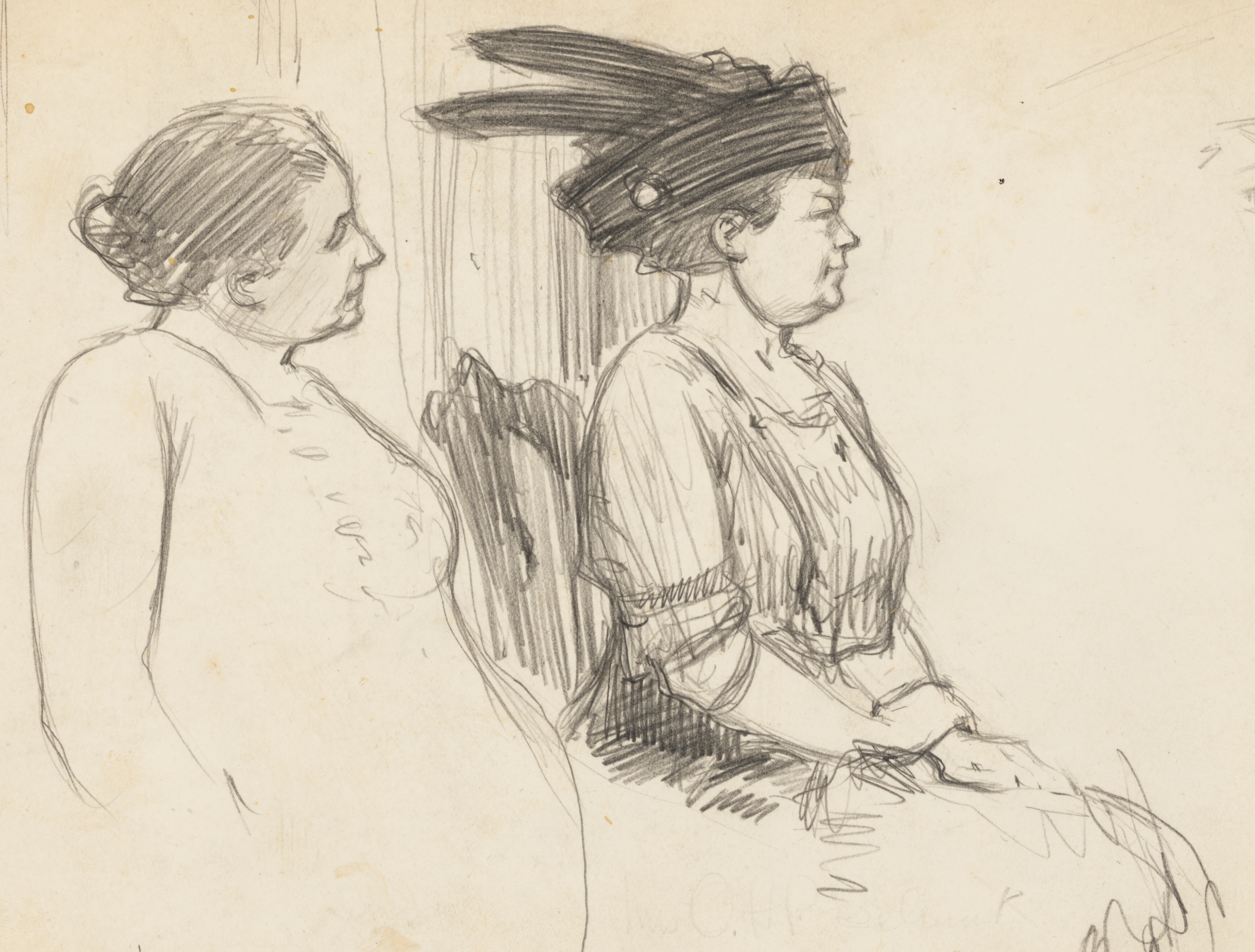
A 1912 sketch of Addams with Alva Vanderbilt Belmont, both members of the National American Woman Suffrage Association. Addams was a vice president of the organization.

Addams called on women, especially middle-class women with leisure time and energy as well as rich philanthropists, to exercise their civic duty to become involved in municipal affairs as a matter of "civic housekeeping". Addams thereby enlarged the concept of civic duty to include roles for women beyond motherhood (which involved child rearing). Women's lives revolved around "responsibility, care, and obligation", which represented the source of women's power. This notion provided the foundation for the municipal or civil housekeeping role that Addams defined and gave added weight to the women's suffrage movement that Addams supported. Addams argued that women, as opposed to men, were trained in the delicate matters of human welfare and needed to build upon their traditional roles of housekeeping to be civic housekeepers. Enlarged housekeeping duties involved reform efforts regarding poisonous sewage, impure milk (which often carried tuberculosis), smoke-laden air, and unsafe factory conditions. Addams led the "garbage wars"; in 1894 she became the first woman appointed as sanitary inspector of Chicago's 19th Ward. With the help of the Hull House Women's Club, within a year over 1,000 health department violations were reported to city council and garbage collection reduced death and disease.

Addams had long discussions with philosopher John Dewey in which they redefined democracy in terms of pragmatism and civic activism, with an emphasis more on duty and less on rights. The two leading perspectives that distinguished Addams and her coalition from the modernizers more concerned with efficiency were the need to extend to social and economic life the democratic structures and practices that had been limited to the political sphere, as in Addams's programmatic support of trade unions and second, their call for a new social ethic to supplant the individualist outlook as being no longer adequate in modern society.

Addams's construction of womanhood involved daughterhood, sexuality, wifehood, and motherhood. In both of her autobiographical volumes, Twenty Years at Hull-House (1910) and The Second Twenty Years at Hull-House (1930), Addams's gender constructions parallel the Progressive-Era ideology she championed. In A New Conscience and an Ancient Evil (1912) she dissected the social pathology of sex slavery, prostitution and other sexual behaviors among working-class women in American industrial centers from 1890 to 1910. Addams's autobiographical persona manifests her ideology and supports her popularized public activist persona as the "Mother of Social Work", in the sense that she represents herself as a celibate matron who served the suffering immigrant masses through Hull House, as if they were her own children. Although not a mother herself, Addams became the "mother to the nation", identified with motherhood in the sense of protective care of her people.

=== Teaching ===
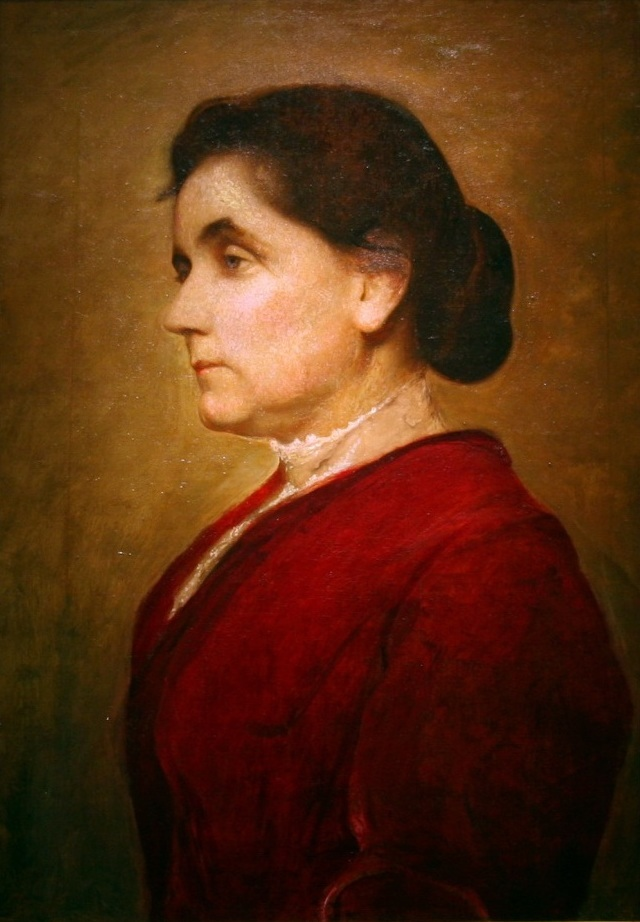
Jane Addams, 1906, by George de Forest Brush (1855–1941), National Portrait Gallery, Smithsonian Institution

Addams kept up her heavy schedule of public lectures around the country, especially at college campuses. In addition, she offered college courses through the Extension Division of the University of Chicago. She declined offers from the university to become directly affiliated with it, including an offer from Albion Small, chair of the Department of Sociology, of a graduate faculty position. She declined in order to maintain her independent role outside of academia. Her goal was to teach adults not enrolled in formal academic institutions, because of their poverty and/or lack of credentials. Furthermore, she wanted no university controls over her political activism.

Addams was appointed to serve on the Chicago Board of Education. Addams was a charter member of the American Sociological Society, founded in 1905. She gave papers to it in 1912, 1915, and 1919. She was the most prominent woman member during her lifetime.

=== Death ===
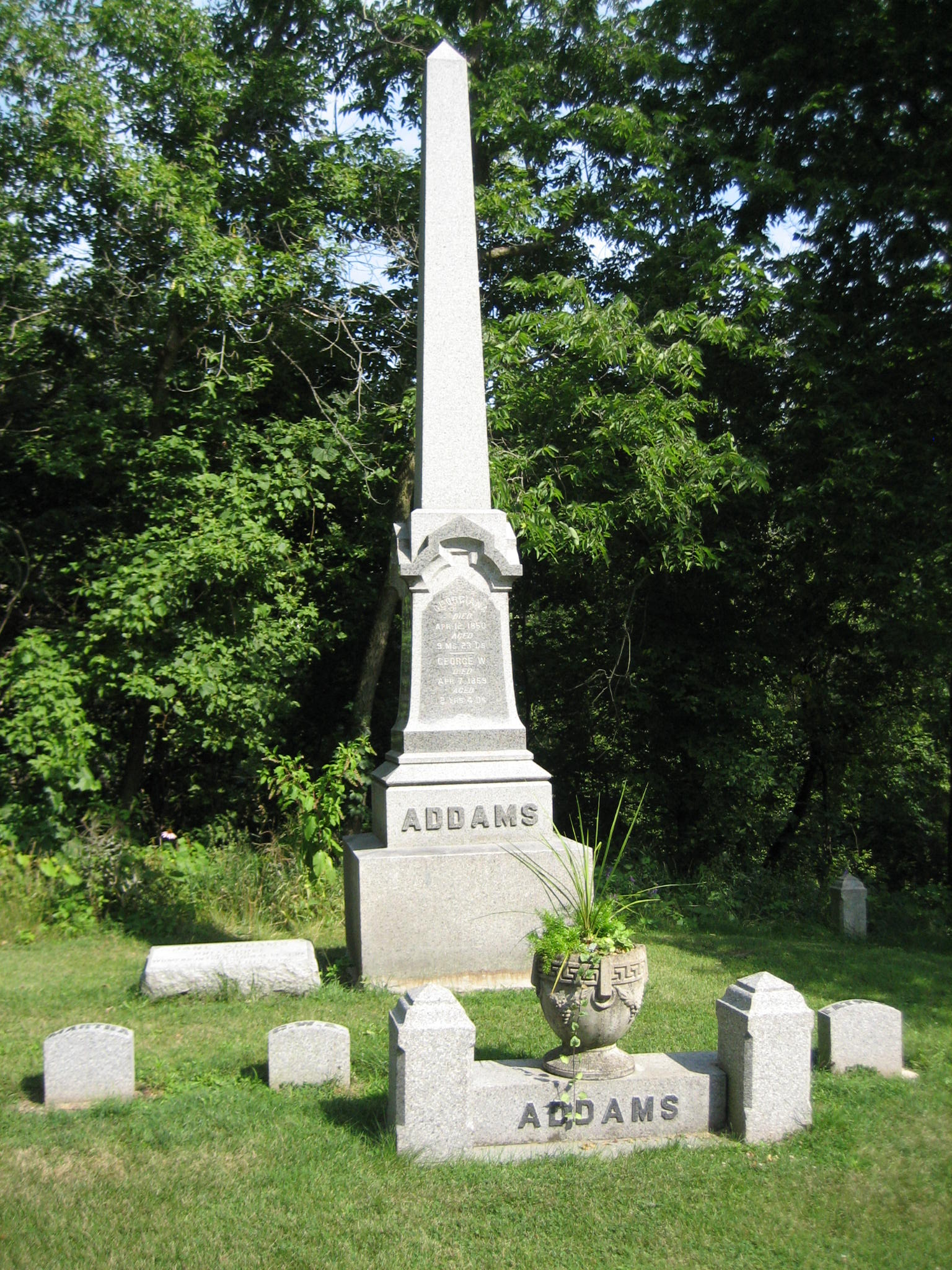
Jane Addams Burial Site in Cedarville, Illinois.

While Addams was often troubled by health problems in her youth and throughout her life, her health began to take a more serious decline after she suffered a heart attack in 1926. In 1931, doctors discovered that Addams had internal cancer. However they never informed her of this condition, and it was only revealed after her death.

She died on May 21, 1935, at the age of 74, in Passavant hospital in Chicago after a surgery to remove an abdominal obstruction. She is buried in her hometown of Cedarville, Illinois.

== Sociology ==
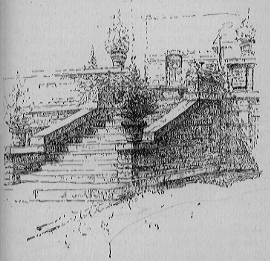
Steps to Hull House. Source Addams: Twenty Years at Hull House (1910), p. 447

Jane Addams was intimately involved with the founding of sociology as a field in the United States. Hull House enabled Addams to befriend and become a colleague to early members of the Chicago School of Sociology. She actively contributed to the sociology academic literature, publishing five articles in the American Journal of Sociology between 1896 and 1914. Her influence, through her work in applied sociology, impacted the thought and direction of the Chicago School of Sociology's members. In 1893, she co-authored the compilation of essays written by Hull House residents and workers titled, Hull-House Maps and Papers. These ideas helped shape and define the interests and methodologies of the Chicago School. She worked with American philosopher George Herbert Mead and John Dewey on social reform issues, including promoting women's rights, ending child labor, and mediating during the 1910 Garment Workers' Strike. This strike in particular bent thoughts of protests because it dealt with women workers, ethnicity, and working conditions. All of these subjects were key items that Addams wanted to see in society.

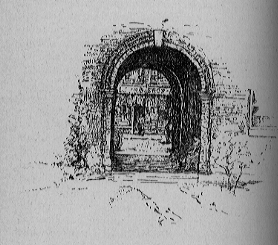
Entrance to Hull House Courtyard. Source Addams: Twenty Years at Hull House (1910), p. 426

The University of Chicago Sociology department was established in 1892, three years after Hull House was established (1889). Members of Hull House welcomed the first group of professors, who soon were "intimately involved with Hull House" and assiduously engaged with applied social reform and philanthropy". In 1893, for example, faculty (Vincent, Small and Bennis) worked with Jane Addams and fellow Hull House resident Florence Kelley to pass legislation "banning sweat shops and employment of children" Albion Small, chair of the Chicago Department of Sociology and founder of the American Journal of Sociology, called for a sociology that was active "in the work of perfecting and applying plans and devices for social improvement and amelioration", which took place in the "vast sociological laboratory" that was 19th-century Chicago. Although untenured, women residents of Hull House taught classes in the Chicago Sociology Department. During and after World War I, the focus of the Chicago Sociology Department shifted away from social activism toward a more scholarly orientation. Social activism was also associated with Communism and a "weaker" woman's work orientation. In response to this change, women sociologists in the department "were moved inmasse out of sociology and into social work" in 1920. The contributions of Jane Addams and other Hull House residents were buried in history.

Mary Jo Deegan, in her 1988 book Jane Addams and the Men of the Chicago School, 1892–1918 was the first person to recover Addams' influence on sociology. Deegan's work has led to recognition of Addams's place in sociology. In a 2001 address, for example, Joe Feagin, then president of the American Sociology Association, identified Addams as a "key founder" and he called for sociology to again claim its activist roots and commitment to social justice.

== Political positions ==
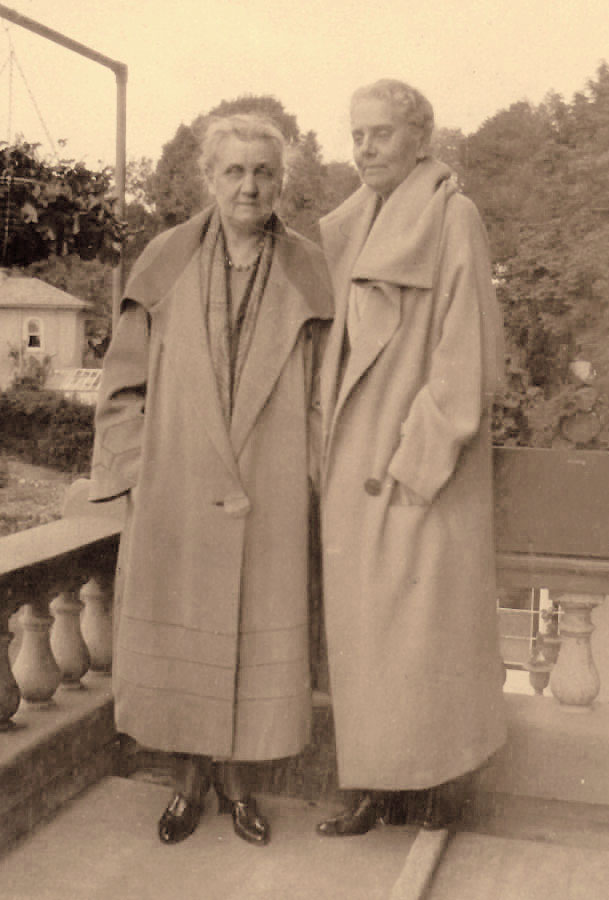
Jane Addams [left] & Mary Rozet Smith, 1923 (Jane Addams Collection/Swarthmore College Peace Collection.)

=== Peace movement ===
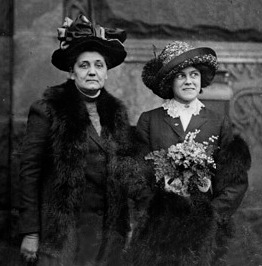
Delegation to the Women's Suffrage Legislature Jane Addams (left) and Miss Elizabeth Burke of the University of Chicago, 1911

In 1898, Addams joined the Anti-Imperialist League, in opposition to the U.S. annexation of the Philippines. A staunch supporter of the Progressive Party, she nominated Theodore Roosevelt for the presidency during the Party Convention, held in Chicago in August 1912. She signed up on the party platform, even though it called for building more battleships. She went on to speak and campaign extensively for Roosevelt's 1912 presidential campaign.

In January 1915, she became involved in the Woman's Peace Party and was elected national chairman. Addams was invited by European women peace activists to preside over the International Congress of Women in The Hague, April 28–30, 1915, and was chosen to head the commission to find an end to the war. This included meeting ten leaders in neutral countries as well as those at war to discuss mediation. This was the first significant international effort against the war. Addams, along with co-delegates Emily Balch and Alice Hamilton, documented their experiences of this venture, published as a book, Women at The Hague (University of Illinois).

In her journal, Balch recorded her impression of Jane Addams (April 1915):

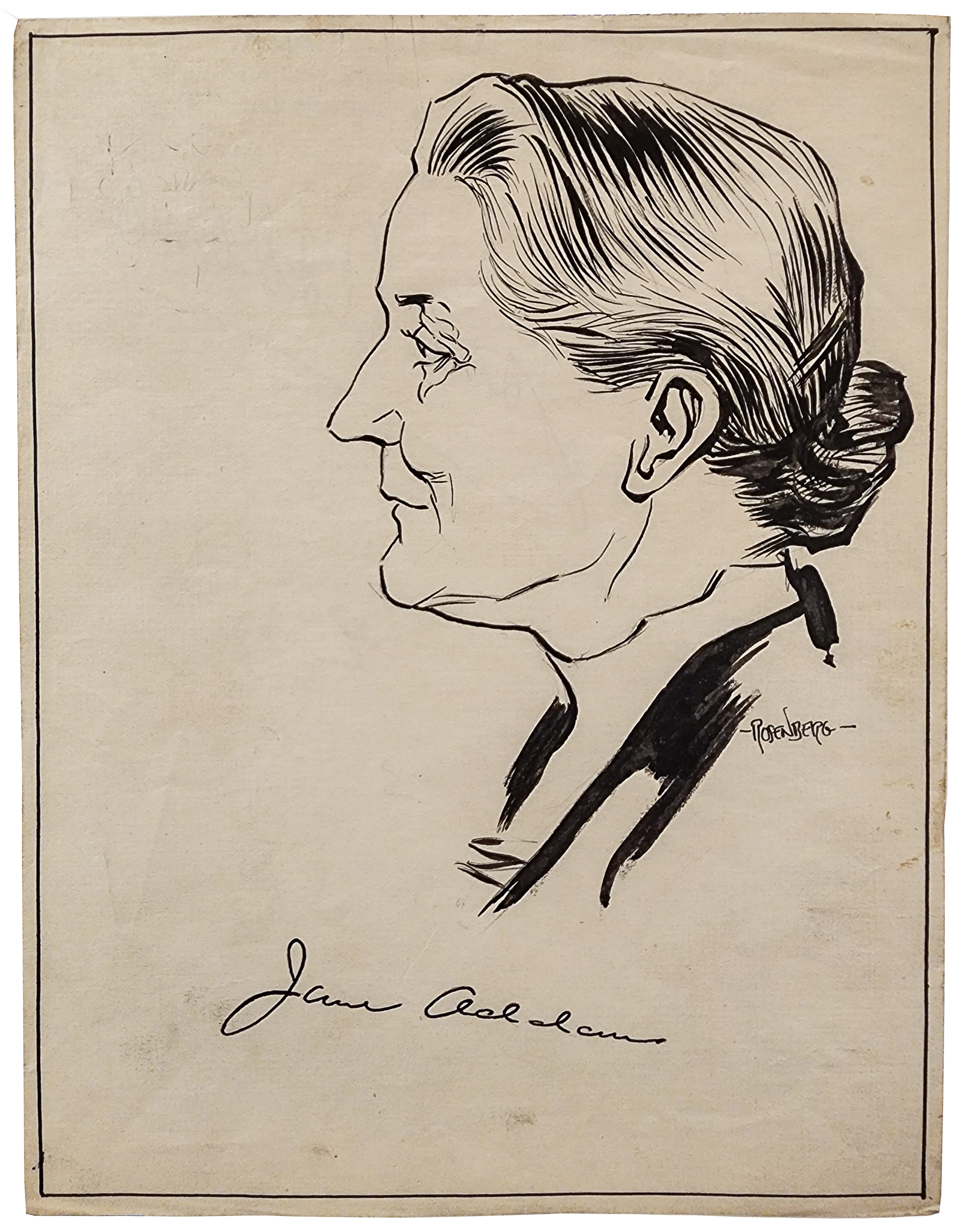
Jane Addams signed drawing by Manuel Rosenberg 1917

Miss Addams shines, so respectful of everyone's views, so eager to understand and sympathize, so patient of anarchy and even ego, yet always there, strong, wise and in the lead. No 'managing', no keeping dark and bringing things subtly to pass, just a radiating wisdom and power of judgement.

Addams was elected president of the International Committee of Women for a Permanent Peace, established to continue the work of the Hague Congress, at a conference in 1919 in Zürich, Switzerland. The International Committee developed into the Women's International League for Peace and Freedom (WILPF). Addams continued as president, a position that entailed frequent travel to Europe and Asia.

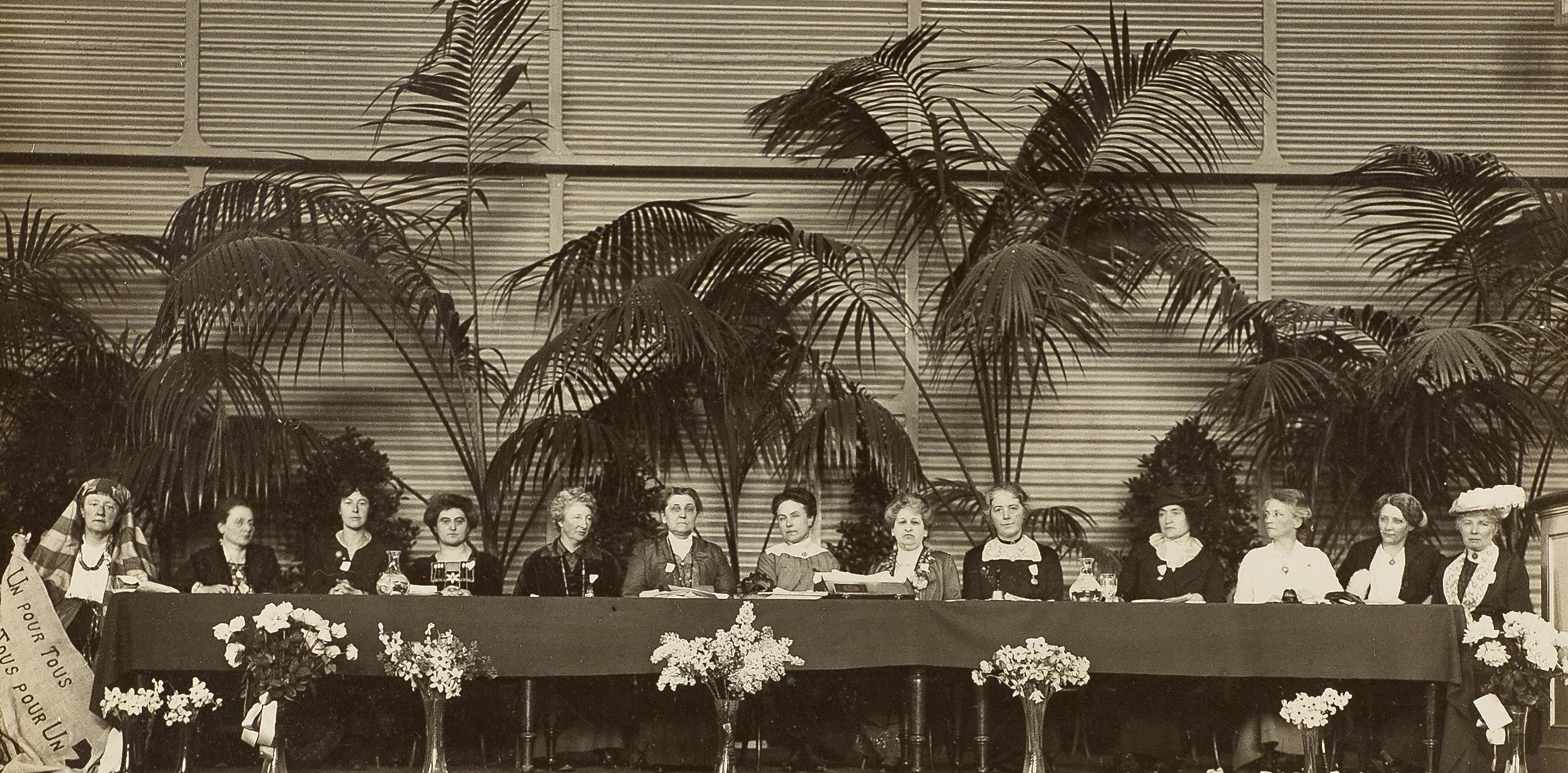
International Congress of Women in 1915. left to right:1. Lucy Thoumaian – Armenia, 2. Leopoldine Kulka, 3. Laura Hughes – Canada, 4. Rosika Schwimmer – Hungary, 5. Anita Augspurg – Germany, 6. Jane Addams – USA, 7. Eugenie Hanner, 8. Aletta Jacobs – Netherlands, 9. Chrystal Macmillan – UK, 10. Rosa Genoni – Italy, 11. Anna Kleman – Sweden, 12. Thora Daugaard – Denmark, 13. Louise Keilhau – Norway

In 1917, she also became a member of the Fellowship of Reconciliation USA (American branch of the International Fellowship of Reconciliation founded in 1919) and was a member of the Fellowship Council until 1933. When the US joined the war in 1917, Addams started to be strongly criticized. She faced increasingly harsh rebukes and criticism as a pacifist. Her 1915 speech on pacifism at Carnegie Hall received negative coverage by newspapers such as The New York Times, which branded her as unpatriotic. Later, during her travels, she spent time meeting with a wide variety of diplomats and civic leaders and reiterating her Victorian belief in women's special mission to preserve peace. Recognition of these efforts came with the award of the Nobel Peace Prize to Addams in 1931; she shared the award with Nicholas Murray Butler. As the first U.S. woman to win the prize, Addams was applauded for her "expression of an essentially American democracy." She donated her share of the prize money to the Women's International League for Peace and Freedom.

=== Pacifism ===
Addams was a major synthesizing figure in the domestic and international peace movements, serving as both a figurehead and leading theoretician; she was influenced especially by Russian novelist Leo Tolstoy and by the pragmatism of philosophers John Dewey and George Herbert Mead. Her books, particularly Newer Ideals of Peace and Peace and Bread in Time of War, and her peace activism informed early feminist theories and perspectives on peace and war. She envisioned democracy, social justice and peace as mutually reinforcing; they all had to advance together to achieve any one. Addams became an anti-war activist from 1899, as part of the anti-imperialist movement that followed the Spanish–American War. Her book Newer Ideals of Peace (1907) reshaped the peace movement worldwide to include ideals of social justice. She recruited social justice reformers like Alice Hamilton, Lillian Wald, Florence Kelley, and Emily Greene Balch to join her in the new international women's peace movement after 1914. Addams's work came to fruition after World War I, when major institutional bodies began to link peace with social justice and probe the underlying causes of war and conflict.

In 1899 and 1907, world leaders sought peace by convening an innovative and influential peace conference at The Hague. These conferences produced Hague Conventions of 1899 and 1907. A 1914 conference was canceled due to World War I. The void was filled by an unofficial conference convened by Women at the Hague. At the time, both the US and The Netherlands were neutral. Jane Addams chaired this pathbreaking International Congress of Women at the Hague, which included almost 1,200 participants from 12 warring and neutral countries. Their goal was to develop a framework to end the violence of war. Both national and international political systems excluded women's voices. The women delegates argued that the exclusion of women from policy discourse and decisions around war and peace resulted in flawed policy. The delegates adopted a series of resolutions addressing these problems and called for extending the franchise and women's meaningful inclusion in formal international peace processes at war's end. Following the conference, Addams and a congressional delegation traveled throughout Europe meeting with leaders, citizen groups, and wounded soldiers from both sides. Her leadership during the conference and her travels to the capitals of the war-torn regions were cited in nominations for the Nobel Peace Prize.

Addams was opposed to U.S. interventionism and expansionism and ultimately was against those who sought American dominance abroad. In 1915, she gave a speech at Carnegie Hall and was booed offstage for opposing U.S. intervention into World War I. Addams damned war as a cataclysm that undermined human kindness, solidarity, and civic friendship, and caused families across the world to struggle. In turn, her views were denounced by patriotic groups and newspapers during World War I (1917–18). Oswald Garrison Villard came to her defense when she suggested that armies gave liquor to soldiers just before major ground attacks. "Take the case of Jane Addams for one. With what abuse did not the [New York] Times cover her, one of the noblest of our women, because she told the simple truth that the Allied troops were often given liquor or drugs before charging across No Man's Land. Yet when the facts came out at the hands of Sir Philip Gibbs and others not one word of apology was ever forthcoming." Even after the war, the WILPF's program of peace and disarmament was characterized by opponents as radical, Communist-influenced, unpatriotic, and unfeminine. Young veterans in the American Legion, supported by some members of the Daughters of the American Revolution (DAR) and the League of Women Voters, were ill-prepared to confront the older, better-educated, more financially secure and nationally famous women of the WILPF. Nevertheless, the DAR could and did expel Addams from membership in their organization. The Legion's efforts to portray the WILPF members as dangerously naive females resonated with working class audiences, but President Calvin Coolidge and the middle classes supported Addams and her WILPF efforts in the 1920s to prohibit poison gas and outlaw war. After 1920, however, she was widely regarded as the greatest woman of the Progressive Era. In 1931, the award of the Nobel Peace prize to her and Nicholas Murray Butler earned her near-unanimous acclaim.

=== "Peaceweaving" ===
Jane Addams was also a philosopher of peace. Peace theorists often distinguish between negative and positive peace. Negative peace deals with the absence of violence or war. Positive peace is more complicated. It deals with the kind of society we aspire to, and can take into account concepts like justice, cooperation, the quality of relationships, freedom, order and harmony. Jane Addams's philosophy of peace is a type of positive peace. Patricia Shields and Joseph Soeters (2017) have summarized her ideas of peace using the term Peaceweaving. They use weaving as a metaphor because it denotes connection. Fibers come together to form a cloth, which is both flexible and strong. Further, weaving is an activity in which men and women have historically engaged. Addams's peaceweaving is a process which builds "the fabric of peace by emphasizing relationships. Peaceweaving builds these relationships by working on practical problems, engaging people widely with sympathetic understanding while recognizing that progress is measured by the welfare of the vulnerable"

=== Eugenics ===
Addams supported eugenics and was vice president of the American Social Hygiene Association, which advocated eugenics in an effort to improve the social 'hygiene' of American society. She was a close friend of noted eugenicists David Starr Jordan and Charlotte Perkins Gilman, and was an avid proponent of the ideas of G. Stanley Hall. Addams belief in eugenics was tied to her desire to eliminate what she perceived to be 'social ills':

Certainly allied to this new understanding of child life and a part of the same movement is the new science of eugenics with its recently appointed university professors. Its organized societies publish an ever-increasing mass of information as to that which constitutes the inheritance of well-born children. When this new science makes clear to the public that those diseases which are a direct outcome of the social evil are clearly responsible for race deterioration, effective indignation may at last be aroused, both against preventable infant mortality for which these diseases are responsible, and against the ghastly fact that the survivors among these afflicted children infect their contemporaries and hand on the evil heritage to another generation.

=== Prohibition ===
While "no record is available of any speech she ever made on behalf of the eighteenth amendment", she nonetheless supported prohibition on the basis that alcohol "was of course a leading lure and a necessary element in houses of prostitution, both from a financial and a social standpoint." She repeated the claim that "professional houses of prostitution could not sustain themselves without the 'vehicle of alcohol.'"

== Personal life ==
Generally, Addams was close to a wide set of other women and was very good at eliciting their involvement from different classes in Hull House's programs. Throughout her life, Addams had romantic relationships with a few of these women, including Mary Rozet Smith and Ellen Starr. Her relationships offered her the time and energy to pursue her social work while being supported emotionally and romantically. Based on her exclusive involvement with women romantically, she was most likely a lesbian, similar to many leading figures in the Women's International League for Peace and Freedom of the time.

Her first romantic partner was Ellen Starr, with whom she founded Hull House, who she met when both were students at Rockford Female Seminary. In 1889, the two visited Toynbee Hall together and started their settlement house project, purchasing a house in Chicago.

Her second romantic partner was Mary Rozet Smith, who was wealthy and supported Addams's work at Hull House, and with whom she shared a house. Historian Lilian Faderman wrote that Jane was in love and she addressed Mary as "My Ever Dear", "Darling" and "Dearest One", and concluded that they shared the intimacy of a married couple. They remained together until 1934, when Mary died of pneumonia, after 40 years together. It was said that, "Mary Smith became and always remained the highest and clearest note in the music that was Jane Addams' personal life". Together they owned a summer house in Bar Harbor, Maine. When apart, they would write to each other at least once a day – sometimes twice. Addams would write to Smith, "I miss you dreadfully and am yours 'til death". The letters also show that the women saw themselves as a married couple: "There is reason in the habit of married folks keeping together", Addams wrote to Smith.

=== Religious beliefs ===
Addams's religious beliefs were shaped by her wide reading and life experience. She saw her settlement work as part of the "social Christian" movement. Addams learned about social Christianity from the co-founders of Toynbee Hall, Samuel and Henrietta Barnett. The Barnetts held a great interest in converting others to Christianity, but they believed that Christians should be more engaged with the world and, in the words of one of the leaders of the social Christian movement in England, W. H. Fremantle, "imbue all human relations with the spirit of Christ's self-renouncing love".

According to Christie and Gauvreau (2001), while the Christian settlement houses sought to Christianize, Jane Addams "had come to epitomize the force of secular humanism." Her image was, however, "reinvented" by the Christian churches.

According to Joslin (2004), "The new humanism, as [Addams] interprets it comes from a secular, and not a religious, pattern of belief".

According to the Jane Addams Hull-House Museum, "Some social settlements were linked to religious institutions. Others, like Hull-House [co-founded by Addams], were secular."

Hilda Satt Polacheck, a former resident of Hull House, stated that Addams firmly believed in religious freedom and bringing people of all faiths into the social, secular fold of Hull House. The one exception, she notes, was the annual Christmas Party, although Addams left the religious side to the church.

The Bible served Addams as both a source of inspiration for her life of service and a manual for pursuing her calling. The emphasis on following Jesus' example and actively advancing the establishment of God's Kingdom on earth is also evident in Addams's work and the Social Gospel movement.

== Legacy ==
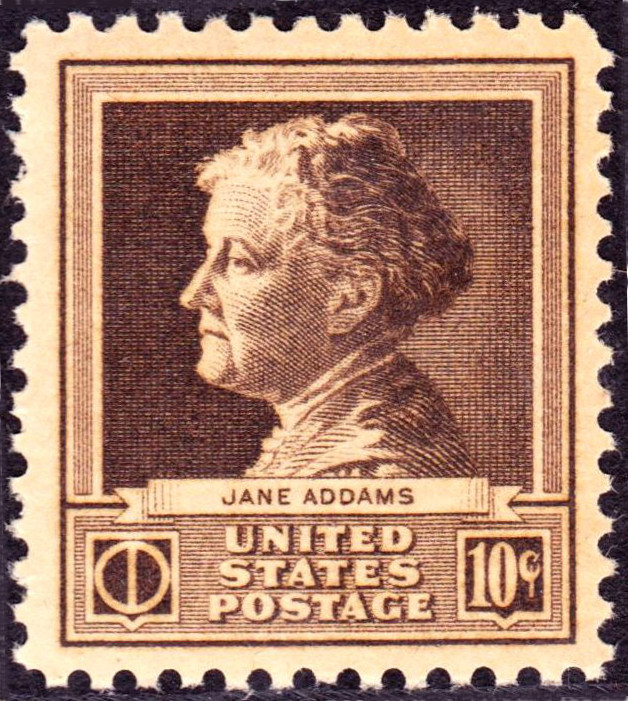
Addams is honored in the 'Famous Americans Series', postal Issues of 1940

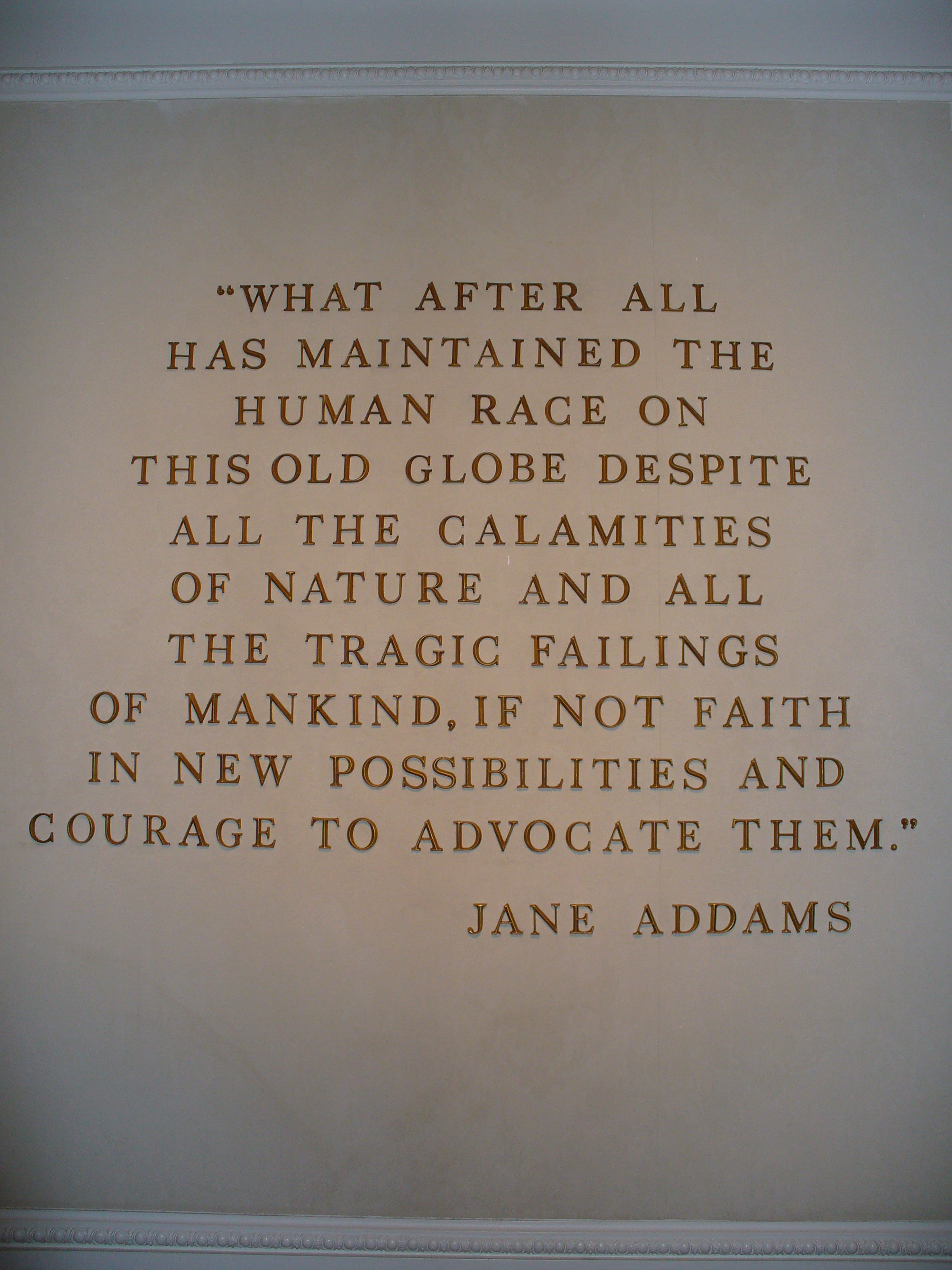
A wall-mounted quote by Jane Addams in The American Adventure (Epcot) in the World Showcase pavilion of Walt Disney World's Epcot

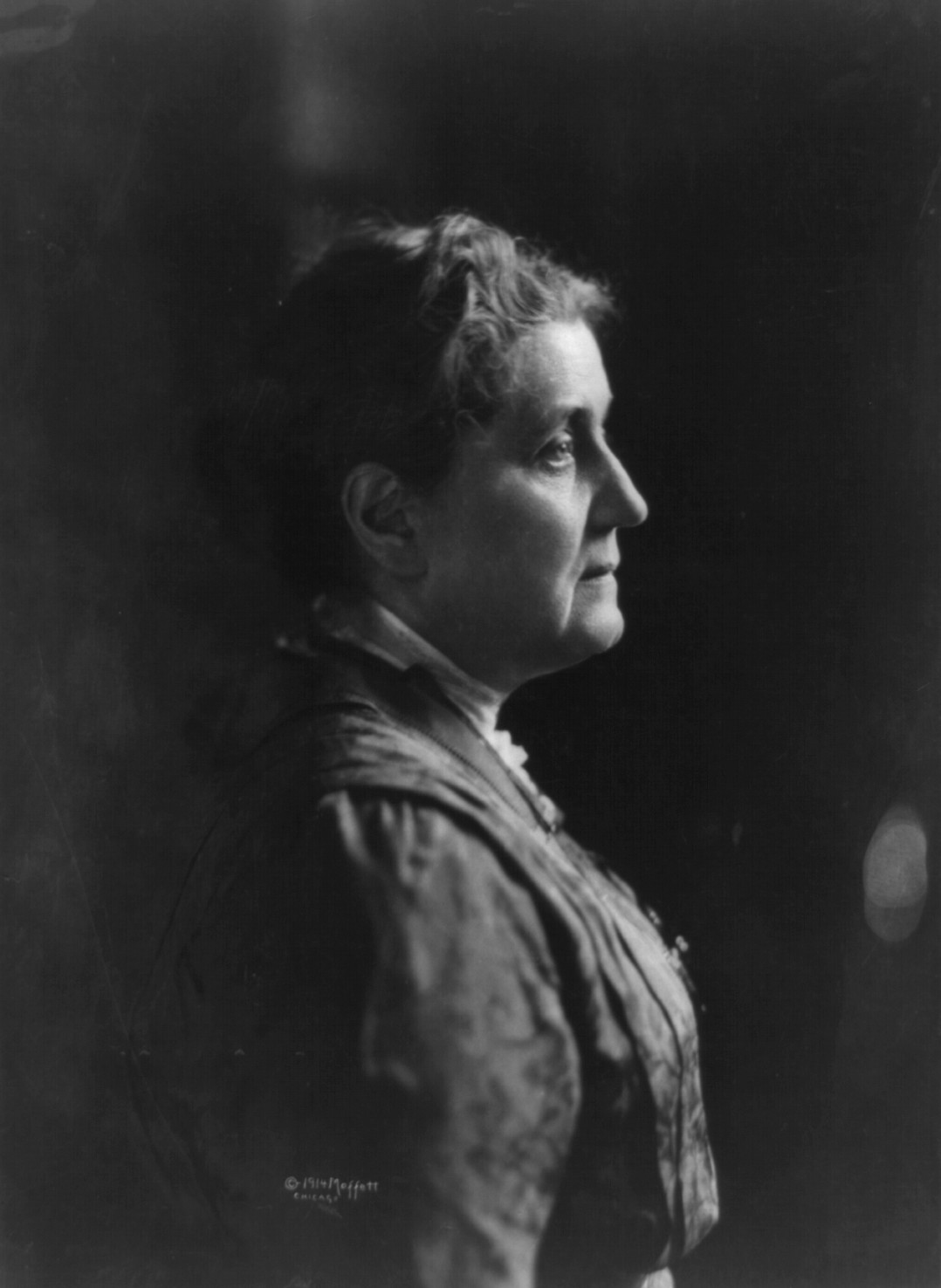
Addams in 1914

Jane Addams is buried at Cedarville Cemetery, Cedarville, Illinois.

Hull House and the Peace Movement are widely recognized as the key tangible pillars of Addams's legacy. While her life focused on the development of individuals, her ideas continue to influence social, political and economic reform in the United States, as well as internationally. Addams and Starr's creation of the settlement house, Hull House, impacted the community, immigrant residents, and social work.

Willard Motley, a resident artist of Hull House, extracting from Addams' central theory on symbolic interactionism, used the neighborhood and its people to write his 1948 best seller, Knock on Any Door. His novel later became a well known court-room film in 1949. This book and film brought attention to how a resident lived an everyday life inside a settlement house and his relationship with Jane Addams.

Addams's role as reformer enabled her to petition the establishment at and alter the social and physical geography of her Chicago neighborhood. Although contemporary academic sociologists defined her engagement as "social work", Addams's efforts differed significantly from activities typically labeled as "social work" during that time period. Before Addams's powerful influence on the profession, social work was largely informed by a "friendly visitor" model in which typically wealthy women of high public stature visited impoverished individuals and, through systematic assessment and intervention, aimed to improve the lives of the poor. Addams rejected the friendly visitor model in favor of a model of social reform/social theory-building, thereby introducing the now-central tenets of social justice and reform to the field of social work.

Addams worked with other reform groups toward goals including the first juvenile court law, tenement-house regulation, an eight-hour working day for women, factory inspection, and workers' compensation. She advocated research aimed at determining the causes of poverty and crime, and she supported women's suffrage. She was a strong advocate of justice for immigrants, African Americans, and minority groups by becoming a chartered member of the NAACP. Among the projects that the members of Hull House opened were the Immigrants' Protective League, the Juvenile Protective Association, the first juvenile court in the United States, and a juvenile psychopathic clinic.

Addams's influential writings and speeches, on behalf of the formation of the League of Nations and as a peace advocate, influenced the later shape of the United Nations.

Jane Addams also sponsored the work of Neva Boyd, who founded the Recreational Training School at Hull House, a one-year educational program in group games, gymnastics, dancing, dramatic arts, play theory, and social problems. At Hull House, Neva Boyd ran movement and recreational groups for children, using games and improvisation to teach language skills, problem-solving, self-confidence and social skills. During the Great Depression, Boyd worked with the Recreational Project in the Works Progress Administration, (WPA) as The Chicago Training School for Playground Workers, which subsequently became the foundation for the Recreational Therapy and Educational Drama movements in the U.S. One of her best known disciples, Viola Spolin taught in the Recreational Theater Program at Hull House during the WPA era. Spolin went on to be a pioneer in the improvisational theater movement in the US and the inventor of Theater Games.

The main legacy left by Jane Addams includes her involvement in the creation of the Hull House, impacting communities and the whole social structure, reaching out to colleges and universities in hopes of bettering the educational system, and passing on her knowledge to others through speeches and books. She is also known for co-winning the Nobel Peace Prize in 1931 with Nicholas Murray Butler.

The Jane Addams Papers Project, originally housed at the University of Illinois at Chicago and Duke University, was relocated to Ramapo College in 2015. The project's digital edition actively engages students and the world with the work and correspondence of Jane Addams.

The Addams neighborhood and elementary school in Long Beach, California are named for her.

=== Tributes ===
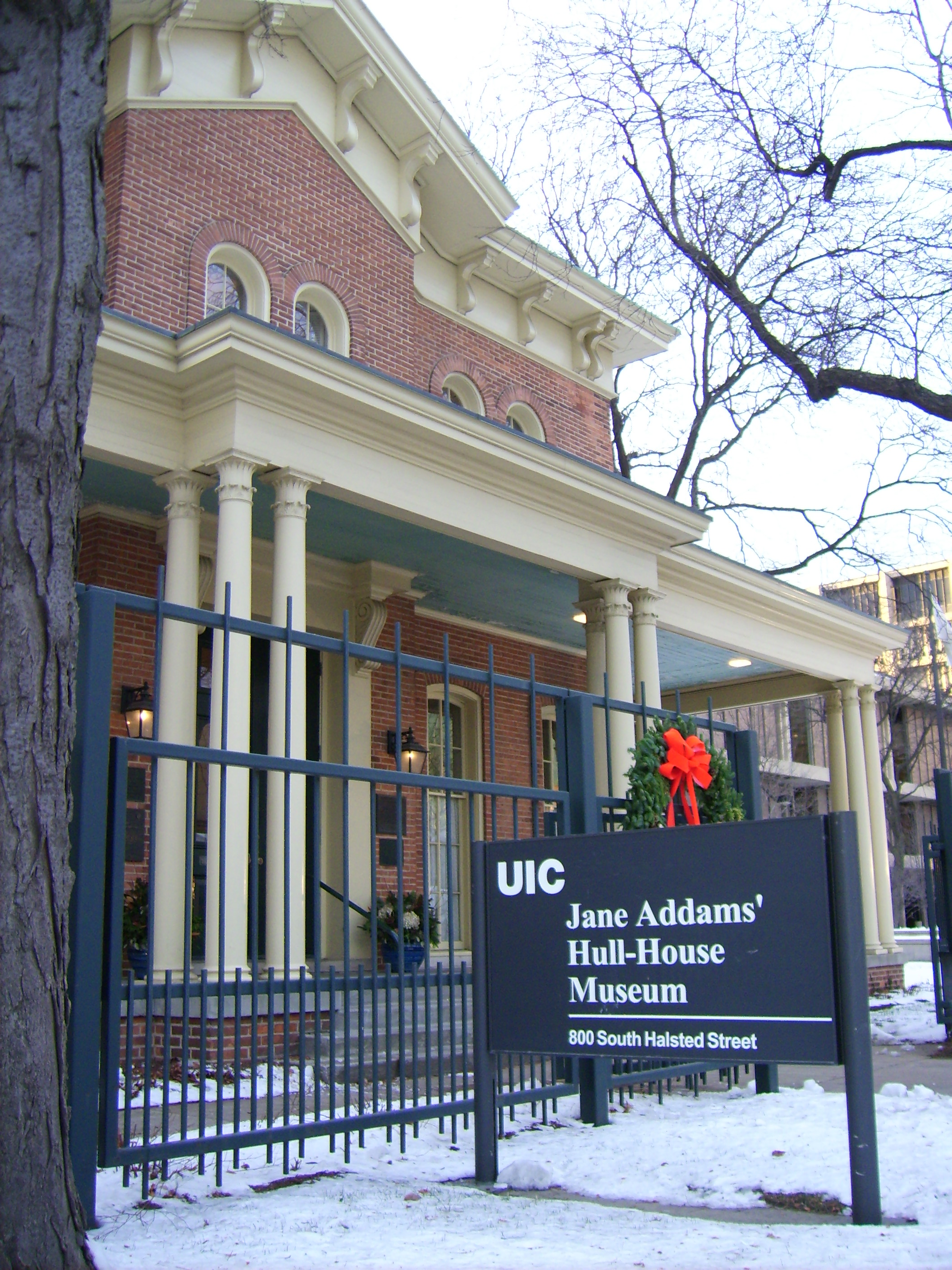
Jane Addams Hull-House Museum in 2006. The museum is located in and preserves the first building from which the Addams settlement took its name, Hull House, and a related community structure. Additional settlement facilities, which over-time grew up around the house, were removed in the 1960s for development of the campus of the University of Illinois Chicago.

On December 10, 2007, Illinois celebrated the first annual Jane Addams Day. Jane Addams Day was initiated by a dedicated school teacher from Dongola, Illinois, assisted by the Illinois Division of the American Association of University Women (AAUW). Chicago activist Jan Lisa Huttner traveled throughout Illinois as Director of International Relations for AAUW-Illinois to help publicize the date, and later gave annual presentations about Jane Addams Day in costume as Jane Addams. In 2010, Huttner appeared as Jane Addams at a 150th Birthday Party sponsored by Rockford University (Jane Addams' alma mater), and in 2011, she appeared as Jane Addams at an event sponsored by the Chicago Park District.

There is a Jane Addams Memorial Park located near Navy Pier in Chicago. A six-piece sculptural grouping honoring Addams by Louise Bourgeois called "Helping Hands" was originally installed in 1993 at Addams Memorial Park. However, they were "relocated to Chicago Women's Park and Gardens" in 2011 after being vandalized. The Jane Addams memorial sculpture was Chicago's first major artwork to honor an important woman. In 2007, the state of Illinois renamed the Northwest Tollway as the Jane Addams Memorial Tollway. Hull House buildings were mostly demolished for the establishment of the campus of the University of Illinois at Chicago in 1963, or relocated. The Hull residence itself and a related building are preserved as a museum and monument to Jane Addams.

The Jane Addams College of Social Work is a professional school at the University of Illinois at Chicago. Jane Addams Business Careers Center is a high school in Cleveland, Ohio. Jane Addams High School For Academic Careers is a high school in The Bronx, New York. Jane Addams House is a residence hall built in 1936 at Connecticut College. In Moline, Illinois and the northwest suburb of Chicago in Palatine, Illinois, there are Jane Addams elementary schools named in her honor.

In 1973, Jane Addams was inducted into the National Women's Hall of Fame. In 2008 Jane Addams was inducted into the Chicago Gay and Lesbian Hall of Fame. Addams was inducted into the Chicago Literary Hall of Fame in 2012. Also, in 2012 she was inducted into the Legacy Walk, an outdoor public display which celebrates LGBTQ history and people. In 2014, Jane Addams was one of the first 20 honorees awarded a 3-foot x 3-foot bronze plaque on San Francisco's Rainbow Honor Walk (www.rainbowhonorwalk.org) paying tribute to LGBT heroes and heroines. In 2015, Addams was named by Equality Forum as one of their 31 Icons of the 2015 LGBT History Month.

== Works ==
=== Books ===
- Democracy and Social Ethics. New York, The Macmillan Company, 1902.
- Newer Ideals of Peace. New York, The Macmillan Company, 1907.
- The Spirit of Youth and the City Streets. New York, The Macmillan Company, 1909.
- Twenty Years at Hull House. With autobiographical notes. New York, The Macmillan Company, 1910.
- Symposium: child labor on the stage. National Child Labor Committee, New York [1911?].
- A New Conscience And An Ancient Evil,. New York, The Macmillan company, 1912.
- The Long Road of Woman's Memory. New York, The Macmillan Company, 1916.
- Peace and Bread in Time of War. New York, The Macmillan Company, 1922.
- The Second Twenty Years at Hull House. New York, The Macmillan Company, 1930.
- The Excellent Becomes the Permanent. New York, The Macmillan Company, 1932.
- My Friend Julia Lathrop. New York, The Macmillan Company, 1935. (ed. 2004, Urbana, University of Illinois Press)

=== Collaborative Works ===
- Women at The Hague: The International Congress of Women, with Alice Hamilton and Emily Greene Balch, Macmillan Company 1915. Women at the Hague; the International Congress of Women and its results - Women Working, 1800–1930 - CURIOSity Digital Collections

=== Personal Papers ===
- Jane Addams Digital Edition Jane Addams Papers Project, Ramapo College of New Jersey.

== See also ==
- Jane Addams Burial Site
- Jane Addams School for Democracy
- Jane Addams Middle School
- Jane Addams Children's Book Award
- John H. Addams Homestead
- List of American philosophers
- List of female Nobel laureates
- List of peace activists
- List of suffragists and suffragettes
- List of women's rights activists
- John Dewey
- George Herbert Mead
- Florence Kelley
- Flora Dunlap
- Mary Treglia
- Elizabeth Harrison (educator)
- Community practice social work
- Stanton Street Settlement
- Progressive Party (United States, 1912)
- American philosophy
- International Fellowship of Reconciliation
- Addams (crater)
