= Winnebago Township =

Winnebago Township may refer to one of the following places in the United States:

- Winnebago Township, Winnebago County, Illinois
- Winnebago Township, Houston County, Minnesota
- Winnebago Township, Thurston County, Nebraska

See also

- Winnebago (disambiguation)
