= Winnebago High School =

Location
- 200 East McNair Road; Winnebago, Illinois 61088; United States
- 42°16′18″N 89°14′21″W

Information
- School type: Public high school
- School district: Winnebago CUSD#323
- Principal: Ben Powers
- Faculty: 33.05 (FTE)
- Grades: 9-12
- Enrollment: 412 (2022–23)
- Average class size: 19.6
- Student to teacher ratio: 12.47
- Colors: Orange; Black
- Mascot: Indian
- Website: whs.winnebagoschools.org

Winnebago High School is a high school in Winnebago CUSD#323, in Winnebago, Illinois.

== Activities ==
=== Sports ===
Winnebago High School competes in the Big Northern Conference and has won state titles in multiple sports competitions, including a combined 20 state titles in boys and girls cross-country as well as state titles in boys soccer, and girls bowling as well as multiple individual state championships.

==== Championships ====
Winnebago High School has won several championships in different sports.

===== Boys Cross Country =====
The Boys Cross Country Team won the 1977-1978 championship under Roger Schmidt. Later, the Boys Cross Country team won the 2002-2003 championship under the direction of Roger Fredrickson. In recent years, the team has won the 2005-2006 championship, and 2007-2008 championship under Joe Erb and Janet Erb.

===== Boys Soccer =====
In the 2008–2009 school year, the Winnebago Boys Soccer team were the state champions. The coach of the winning team was Mary Beth Elsen.

===== Girls Bowling =====
Under the direction of coach Karin Morrison, the 2006-2007 Girls Bowling Team were the state champions.

===== Girls Cross Country =====
The Girls Cross Country has won 12 championships under 2 separate groups of coaches. Under Roger Fredrickson, the team won the 1989–1990, 1993–1994, 1994–1995, 1995–1996, 1999–2000, 2000–2001, and 2002-2003 championships. The team won state championships in 2005–2006, 2006–2007, 2007–2008, 2008–2009, 2009–2010, 2019–2020, and 2025-2026 under the coaching of Joe and Janet Erb.

=== Scholastic Bowl ===
Winnebago Scholastic Bowl teams that were state champions the 1992-1993 and 1994-1995 school years. and national champions.

=== Robotics Team ===
The school also competes in the FIRST Robotics Competition as Winnovation, Team 1625. Its animation sub-team won the International Autodesk Visualization Award in 2007. The team has also been runner-up at the FIRST Championship in 2010 and 2014. In 2020 Winnovation made it to the FIRST championship but because of COVID they could not complete. In 2022 they received the Engineering Inspiration award at Central Illinois Regional, in Peoria, IL. Sending them to the FIRST championship again, but now paid by NASA. In the 2023 season, they competed the Iowa Regional- where they were finalists and received a wildcard from FRC Team 4329 the Lutheran Roboteers then sending them back to Houston again for the world championship. The team celebrated their 20th anniversary season in 2024. During their 20th season, the team competed in Iowa again, and then in Wisconsin where there they received the industrial design award.
