= Shirland Township, Illinois =

Shirland Township
- Township
- Location in Winnebago County
- Coordinates: 42°28′08″N 89°12′12″W
- Country: United States
- State: Illinois
- County: Winnebago
- Established: November 6, 1849

Government
  - Supervisor: Helen J. Weaver

Area
  - Total: 19.28 sq mi (49.9 km^{2})
  - Land: 19.2 sq mi (50 km^{2})
  - Water: 0.08 sq mi (0.21 km^{2}) 0.41%
- Elevation: 801 ft (244 m)

Population (2010)
  - Estimate (2016): 958
  - Density: 51.5/sq mi (19.9/km^{2})
- Time zone: UTC-6 (CST)
  - Summer (DST): UTC-5 (CDT)
- FIPS code: 17-201-69615
- Website: shirlandtownship.com

Shirland Township is located in Winnebago County, Illinois. It includes the unincorporated community of Shirland.

As of the 2010 census, its population was 988 and it contained 423 housing units.

== Geography ==
According to the 2010 census, the township has a total area of 19.28 square miles (49.9 km^{2}), of which 19.2 square miles (50 km^{2}) (or 99.59%) is land and 0.08 square miles (0.21 km^{2}) (or 0.41%) is water.

== Demographics ==
Historical population
Census	Pop.	Note	%±
2016 (est.)	958
U.S. Decennial Census
