= Winnebago =

Winnebago can refer to:

- The exonym of the Ho-Chunk tribe of Native North Americans with reservations in Nebraska, Iowa, and Wisconsin
  - Winnebago Tribe of Nebraska, a federally recognized tribe group in the state
  - The Winnebago language of the Ho-Chunk (Winnebago) tribe
- Winnebago (chicken), a 19th-century American chicken breed
- Winnebago Council Boy Scout Council
- Winnebago Industries, a manufacturer of recreational vehicles and motor homes based in Forest City, Iowa

== Places ==
- Lake Winnebago in eastern Wisconsin
- The Winnebago Pool, a group of interconnected lakes in eastern Wisconsin
- Winnebago Scout Reservation, a Boy Scout camp in Rockaway, New Jersey

=== Communities ===
- Winnebago, Illinois
- Winnebago, Minnesota
- Winnebago, Nebraska
- Winnebago, Wisconsin
- Winnebago Mission, Wisconsin

== See also ==
- Winnebago County (disambiguation)
- Winnebago Township (disambiguation)
