= James Weber Linn =

American politician

Member of the Illinois House of Representatives
- In office 1939 – July 16, 1939

Personal details
- Born: May 11, 1876 Winnebago, Illinois, U.S.
- Died: July 16, 1939 (aged 63) Harbert, Michigan, U.S.
- Cause of death: Leukemia
- Party: Democratic
- Relatives: Jane Addams (aunt)
- Education: University of Chicago
- Profession: Politician, educator, writer

James Weber Linn (May 11, 1876 in Winnebago, Illinois – July 16, 1939) was an American educator, writer, and politician.

He graduated from University of Chicago in 1897. Linn then taught English at the University of Chicago. He wrote several books. Linn also wrote newspaper and magazine articles. He was the nephew of social worker Jane Addams. Linn served in the Illinois House of Representatives in 1939 when he died while still in office. Linn was a Democrat. Linn died at his summer home, from leukemia, in Harbert, Michigan.
