= Durand Township, Illinois =

Durand Township
- Township
- Location in Winnebago County
- Coordinates: 42°24′42″N 89°20′27″W
- Country: United States
- State: Illinois
- County: Winnebago
- Established: November 6, 1849

Government
  - Supervisor: Edward L. Mueller

Area
  - Total: 29.62 sq mi (76.7 km^{2})
  - Land: 29.62 sq mi (76.7 km^{2})
  - Water: 0.01 sq mi (0.026 km^{2}) 0.03%
- Elevation: 863 ft (263 m)

Population (2010)
  - Estimate (2016): 2,324
  - Density: 80.8/sq mi (31.2/km^{2})
- Time zone: UTC-6 (CST)
  - Summer (DST): UTC-5 (CDT)
- FIPS code: 17-201-21293

Durand Township is located in Winnebago County, Illinois. As of the 2010 census, its population was 2,394 and it contained 1,035 housing units.

== Geography ==
According to the 2010 census, the township has a total area of 29.62 square miles (76.7 km^{2}), of which 29.62 square miles (76.7 km^{2}) (or 100%) is land and 0.01 square miles (0.026 km^{2}) (or 0.03%) is water.

== Demographics ==
Historical population
Census	Pop.	Note	%±
2016 (est.)	2,324
U.S. Decennial Census
