= Shirland, Illinois =

Shirland
- Unincorporated community
- Location of Shirland within Illinois Shirland (the United States)
- Coordinates: 42°26′40″N 89°11′51″W
- Country: United States
- State: Illinois
- County: Winnebago
- Township: Shirland
- Elevation: 738 ft (225 m)
- Time zone: UTC-6 (CST)
  - Summer (DST): UTC-5 (CDT)
- Postal code: 61079
- Area code: 815

Shirland is an unincorporated community in Shirland Township, in Winnebago County, Illinois, United States, and is located northwest of Rockford. It is part of the Rockford, Illinois Metropolitan Statistical Area.

== History ==
An earlier name for the area was Kepotah. The name was changed when the Shirland post office was established August 15, 1857.
