= Winnebago Community Unit School District 323 =

School district in Winnebago County, Illinois, United States

Address
- 304 East McNair Road Winnebago, Illinois, 61088; United States
- Coordinates: 42°16′18.5″N 89°14′15.7″W

District information
- Type: Public
- Grades: PreK–12
- NCES District ID: 1742790

Students and staff
- Students: 1,290

Other information
- Website: www.winnebagoschools.org

Winnebago Community Unit School District #323 is a school district headquartered in Winnebago, Illinois.

The district is mostly in Winnebago County, where it includes Winnebago and portions of Rockford. The district extends into Stephenson County.

== Schools ==
- Winnebago High School
- Winnebago Middle School
- McNair Elementary
- Simon Elementary
