= Pecatonica Community Unit School District 321 =

School district in Illinois, United States

Pecatonica Community Unit School District 321 is a school district headquartered in Pecatonica, Illinois.

Much of the district is in Winnebago County, where it includes Pecatonica and Westlake Village. A portion of the district is in Stephenson County.

== History ==
Circa the 2020s, The Gazette reported that the district had the second best test results in the Common Core and PARCC examinations out of several area school districts.

In 2021, Carl Carlson became the superintendent; he is an alumnus of this district.

== Schools ==
- Pecatonica High School (Illinois)
- Pecatonica Community Middle School
- Pecatonica Elementary School
