= Latham Park, Illinois =

- Unincorporated community
- Location within Illinois Location within the United States
- Coordinates: 42°22′06″N 89°03′46″W
- Country: United States
- State: Illinois
- County: Winnebago
- Elevation: 755 ft (230 m)
- Time zone: UTC-6 (Central (CST))
  - Summer (DST): UTC-5 (CDT)
- Area codes: 815 & 779
- GNIS feature ID: 411840

Latham Park is an unincorporated community in Winnebago County, Illinois, United States.
