= Lake Summerset, Illinois =

Lake Summerset
- Census Designated Place
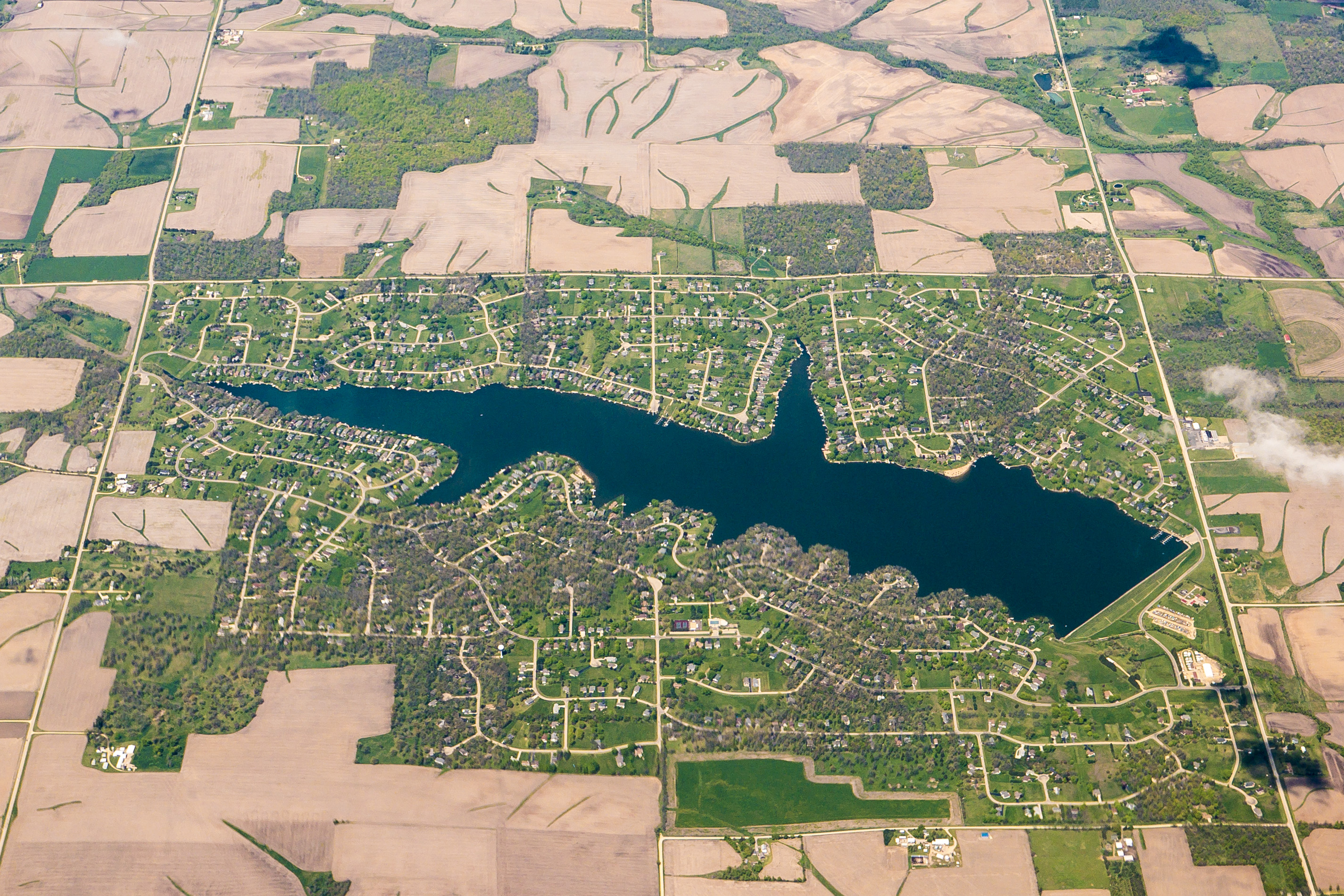
- Aerial view of Lake Summerset on May 6, 2017

- Location in Winnebago County and the state of Illinois.
- Coordinates: 42°27′07″N 89°23′55″W
- Country: United States
- State: Illinois
- County: Stephenson, Winnebago
- Township: Rock Grove, Laona

Area
  - Total: 2.56 sq mi (6.62 km^{2})
  - Land: 2.12 sq mi (5.49 km^{2})
  - Water: 0.44 sq mi (1.13 km^{2})
- Elevation: 824 ft (251 m)

Population (2020)
  - Total: 2,342
  - Density: 1,105.0/sq mi (426.65/km^{2})
- Time zone: UTC-6 (CST)
  - Summer (DST): UTC-5 (CDT)
- Postal code: 61019
- Area code: 815
- FIPS code: 17-41456
- GNIS feature ID: 2393085
- Website: http://www.lake-summerset.com/

Lake Summerset is a census-designated place (CDP) in Stephenson and Winnebago counties in Illinois. The population was 2,342 at the 2020 census.

== Geography ==
According to the United States Census Bureau, the CDP has a total area of 2.5 square miles (6.5 km^{2}), of which 2.1 square miles (5.4 km^{2}) is land and 0.4 square miles (1.0 km^{2}) (17.20%) is water.

== Demographics ==
Historical population
Census	Pop.	Note	%±
2020	2,342		—
U.S. Decennial Census

=== 2020 census ===
As of the 2020 census, Lake Summerset had a population of 2,342. The median age was 53.7 years. 17.9% of residents were under the age of 18 and 33.9% of residents were 65 years of age or older. For every 100 females there were 100.2 males, and for every 100 females age 18 and over there were 100.9 males age 18 and over.

0.0% of residents lived in urban areas, while 100.0% lived in rural areas.

There were 992 households in Lake Summerset, of which 21.9% had children under the age of 18 living in them. Of all households, 63.5% were married-couple households, 15.9% were households with a male householder and no spouse or partner present, and 15.5% were households with a female householder and no spouse or partner present. About 23.8% of all households were made up of individuals and 15.7% had someone living alone who was 65 years of age or older.

There were 1,362 housing units, of which 27.2% were vacant. The homeowner vacancy rate was 2.4% and the rental vacancy rate was 9.9%.

Racial composition as of the 2020 census
Race	Number	Percent
White	2,170	92.7%
Black or African American	18	0.8%
American Indian and Alaska Native	3	0.1%
Asian	14	0.6%
Native Hawaiian and Other Pacific Islander	4	0.2%
Some other race	34	1.5%
Two or more races	99	4.2%
Hispanic or Latino (of any race)	74	3.2%

=== 2000 census ===
At the 2000 census there were 2,061 people, 816 households, and 677 families in the CDP. The population density was 995.3 inhabitants per square mile (384.3/km^{2}). There were 1,050 housing units at an average density of 507.0 per square mile (195.8/km^{2}). The racial makeup of the CDP was 98.88% White, 0.24% African American, 0.05% Native American, 0.19% Asian, and 0.63% from two or more races. Hispanic or Latino of any race were 0.68%.

Of the 816 households 25.6% had children under the age of 18 living with them, 77.7% were married couples living together, 3.6% had a female householder with no husband present, and 17.0% were non-families. 13.5% of households were one person and 7.6% were one person aged 65 or older. The average household size was 2.53 and the average family size was 2.76.

The age distribution was 21.7% under the age of 18, 4.2% from 18 to 24, 22.1% from 25 to 44, 29.8% from 45 to 64, and 22.2% 65 or older. The median age was 47 years. For every 100 females, there were 95.7 males. For every 100 females age 18 and over, there were 99.0 males.

The median household income was $59,648 and the median family income was $65,066. Males had a median income of $50,522 versus $27,708 for females. The per capita income for the CDP was $27,160. About 1.0% of families and 0.8% of the population were below the poverty line, including none of those under the age of eighteen or sixty-five or over.

== Education ==
The portion in Winnebago County is in the Durand Community Unit School District 322.

The portion in Stephenson County is in the Dakota Community Unit School District 201.
