= Jane Addams School for Democracy =

Located in West Side Saint Paul, Minnesota, United States, at Baker Center, the Jane Addams School for Democracy was an organization dedicated to the ideals of democracy and citizenship. In an environment that seeks to embody the principles of democratic education, recent immigrants and college students from the surrounding community come together to benefit from one another's experiences. This was accomplished through cultural exchanges that take place in several learning circles, where each circle represents a major language other than English that is spoken by the participants. Over time, the Jane Addams School expanded to hold four such learning circles: East African, Hmong, Spanish, and another for Children. The school was administered by the Center for Democracy and Citizenship at the University of Minnesota which moved to Augsburg College in 2009 and was renamed the Sabo Center for Democracy and Citizenship. The program closed in December 2016.

While much of the work at Jane Addams School was focused on language and citizenship, the school engaged in all issues that affect the lives of its participants through public work initiatives that include neighborhood art and theater projects with children, efforts to improve education at local schools, a community wellness project, and work with immigrants on new policy initiatives for citizenship, health care, transportation, and housing.

== Philosophy ==
Taking inspiration from the Chicago Hull House founded by the sociologist Jane Addams, the Jane Addams School for Democracy seeks to create an environment where immigrants and college students mutually learn from one another in the spirit of democracy, citizenship, and public work. The School lists its values as including the belief that everyone is a teacher and everyone is a learner, all cultures should be honored, adults and children learn together, citizenship means making contributions to the community, and changes occur when people work together.

== See also ==
- Jane Addams
- Hull House
- Democratic school
- Collaborative learning
- Teaching for social justice
