= Wempletown, Illinois =

- Unincorporated community
- Location within Illinois Location within the United States
- Coordinates: 42°20′36″N 89°12′15″W
- Country: United States
- State: Illinois
- County: Winnebago
- Elevation: 866 ft (264 m)
- Time zone: UTC-6 (Central (CST))
  - Summer (DST): UTC-5 (CDT)
- Area codes: 815 & 779
- GNIS feature ID: 420745

Wempletown is an unincorporated community in Winnebago County, Illinois, United States.
