= Ellen Gates Starr =

American social activist (1859–1940)

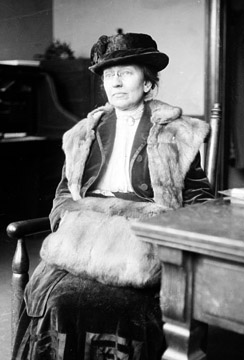
- Starr in 1914
- Born: March 19, 1859; Laona, Illinois, U.S.
- Died: February 10, 1940 (aged 80); Suffern, New York, U.S.
- Education: Rockford Female Seminary

Ellen Gates Starr (March 19, 1859 – February 10, 1940) was an American social reformer and activist. With Jane Addams, she founded Chicago's Hull House, an adult education center, in 1889; the settlement house expanded to 13 buildings in the neighborhood.

== Early life and education ==
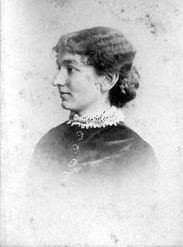
Ellen Gates Starr, c. 1890

Ellen Gates Starr was born on March 19, 1859, in Laona, Illinois, US, to Caleb Allen Starr and Susan Gates (née Child).

From 1877 to 1878, Starr attended the Rockford Female Seminary, where she first met Jane Addams. After being forced to leave school due to financial concerns, Starr taught for ten years in Chicago.

== Social reform work ==
Starr joined Addams on a tour of Europe in 1888. While in London, the pair were inspired by the success of the English Settlement movement and became determined to establish a similar social settlement in Chicago. When they returned to Chicago in 1889, they co-founded Hull House as a kindergarten, then a day nursery, an infancy care centre, and a center for continuing education for adults. In 1891, Starr created the Butler Art Gallery as the first addition to the Hull mansion. She travelled to England to study with the famed bookbinder, T. J. Cobden-Sanderson. After her return, she established a bookbindery class at the settlement house in 1898, followed by an arts and crafts business school.

She also sought to bring the Arts and Crafts movement to Chicago. In 1894, Starr founded the Chicago Public School Art Society with the help of the Chicago Woman's Club. The goal of the organization was to provide original works of art and good quality reproductions, to promote public school learning and an appreciation of beauty as a sign of good citizenship. Starr was the president of the society until 1897, when she founded the Chicago Society of Arts and Crafts.

Starr was also active in the campaign to reform child labor laws and industrial working conditions in Chicago. She was a member of the Women's Trade Union League and helped organize striking garment workers in 1896, 1910, and 1915. However, by belief she was firmly anti-industrialisation, idealizing the guild system of the Middle Ages and later the Arts and Crafts Movement. She was arrested at a restaurant strike. In the slums of Chicago, she taught children who could not afford school education about such writers as Dante and Robert Browning.

== Personal life ==
=== Relationship with Jane Addams ===
Lillian Faderman argues that Starr was Addams's "first serious attachment". The friendship between the two lasted many years, and the two lived together. Addams wrote to Starr, "Let's love each other through thick and thin and work out a salvation". The director of the Hull-House Museum at the University of Illinois at Chicago, Lisa Lee, has argued that the relationship was romantic and a lesbian one. Brown agrees that the two can be regarded as lesbians if they are seen as "women loving women", although there is no evidence they were sexual partners. The intensity of the relationship dwindled when Addams met Mary Rozet Smith (who had been Starr's student at Miss Kirkland's School). These two women subsequently set up home together.

=== Religious beliefs ===
Starr joined the Episcopal Church in 1883. By 1894, she was a member of the Society of the Companions of the Holy Cross, an Episcopal women's prayer society that combined prayer with education and activism for social justice. Founded by Emily Malbone Morgan, the Companions included a number of influential reformers from around the United States, such as Vida Scudder, and Mary Simkhovitch. Companions came together each summer for a week retreat that allowed women reformers to reconnect spiritually, network with other reformers, and attend a series of educational programs on social issues.

== Later life ==
Although Starr possessed an interest in Roman Catholicism for many years, it was only in 1920, when she believed the Church was seriously teaching social justice, that she converted. Her work in campaigns against child labour encountered much opposition from inside the Church.

In 1929, complications caused by surgery to remove a spinal abscess resulted in her becoming paralyzed from the waist down. In 1931, seriously ill, Starr retired to a Roman Catholic convent in Suffern, New York, where she was cared for by the Society of the Holy Child Jesus. She was not a member of their religious community, nor any other.

After eight years as an invalid, Starr died at the convent on February 10, 1940.

== In media ==
In 2016, St. Hyacinth Basilica Elementary in Chicago's Avondale neighborhood, which had closed in 2014, was used as the setting for Albany Park Theater Project's renowned immersive theater play Learning Curve. It was transformed as the play's "Ellen Gates Starr High School", named for the co-founder of Hull House.

== Selected works ==
- (1896) Settlements and the church's duty
- (n.d.) Reflections on the breviary
