= Westfield Corners, Illinois =

- Unincorporated community
- Location within Illinois Location within the United States
- Coordinates: 42°12′30″N 89°13′51″W
- Country: United States
- State: Illinois
- County: Winnebago
- Elevation: 853 ft (260 m)
- Time zone: UTC-6 (Central (CST))
  - Summer (DST): UTC-5 (CDT)
- Area codes: 815 & 779
- GNIS feature ID: 420961

Westfield Corners (also Elida) is an unincorporated community in Winnebago County, Illinois, United States.
