= Mary Treglia =

American social worker

- Born: October 7, 1897
- Died: October 10, 1959 (aged 62)
- Occupation: Social worker
- Known for: Mary J. Treglia Community House

Mary Joanna Treglia (October 7, 1897 – October 10, 1959) was an American social worker who was the director of a community house in Sioux City, Iowa. The community house was founded in 1921 to serve the city's immigrant population. Treglia was once a member of the Californian Bloomer Girls baseball team prior to returning to Sioux City and dedicating her life as an employee and later as the director of the community house.

== Personal life and career ==
Treglia was born on October 7, 1897, to two immigrants from Italy, her father Tony and her mother Rose. Her father died when Treglia was a child and her mother, who sold confections at a store in Sioux City, died in 1945. The store was owned by both of Treglia's parents when her father was alive. She was known for her athleticism when she attended Central High School in Sioux City, and she later became a part of an all-girl California baseball team named the Bloomer Girls. Her baseball career helped her gain the opportunity to appear in films as an extra. Treglia was inspired by her family and their ethnic traditions as a child. She was also aware of poverty and what immigrants had to deal with.

In 1920, Treglia moved back to Sioux City at a time when the city was flourishing due to its packing plants. A community house was in a lumber yards building nearby on the East Side in 1921 near the Floyd River. The community house was meant to teach immigrants how to become an American citizen and learn English. Treglia became an employee at the community house in 1921 and she became the director in 1926. She helped immigrants in the community house for close to 40 years with her casework, helping them become American citizens, receive a fair education, and instituting proper flood control. Treglia introduced the immigrants to the American Association of University Women and the Junior League. When the school board or city would ignore their problems, Treglia helped the immigrants by working with Sioux City leaders.

Treglia started the Women of All Nations. Treglia stated of the women's club, "It took much diplomacy to have Jews and Gentiles work together, to have Mohammedans and Christians sit at the same table, and women in clubs exchange recipes for Irish stew and Italian spaghetti." She also helped boys that were sent to her for guidance by the court. She created clubs for girls including a Homemakers Club, an Art Club, a Dramatics Club, and Little Sisters/Big Sisters. She helped girls that broke the law.

When the community house became condemned in 1932, the board of directors wanted to build a new one. However, the facility was not demolished due to a new location not being found. Sioux City later built a new location on an old schoolground, providing free services and materials. Treglia helped gather needed funds by receiving donations from people and businesses.

During her employment at the community house, Treglia received a bachelor's degree from Morningside College in 1933. It is likely that Treglia felt pressured to complete her education due to discrimination against volunteers who helped the needy, rather than those who are "trained professionals".

The new building opened in November 1933 and it was completed in June 1934. Shortly after the construction was completed, flooding from the Floyd River destroyed the gym's floor and left a terrible smell. After Treglia and the East Side community worked together, a plan was formed that stopped the flooding. The community house was named the Mary J. Treglia Community House in 1956. Treglia later discovered in 1959 that part of the flood control plan was to divert the river channel through the East Side neighborhood which would result in the community house being destroyed. The neighborhood worked together to try to stop the demolition without Treglia helping due to her death on October 10, 1959. The entire neighborhood was destroyed and its residents were relocated. The project that destroyed the area for the river channel was named the Mary J. Treglia Urban Renewal Project. A new building was built in Sioux City on 900 Jennings Street in 1963.
