= Rock Grove Township, Illinois =

Rock Grove Township
- Township
- Location in Stephenson County
- Coordinates: 42°28′44″N 89°29′11″W
- Country: United States
- State: Illinois
- County: Stephenson

Government
  - Supervisor: George Suess

Area
  - Total: 30.42 sq mi (78.8 km^{2})
  - Land: 30.27 sq mi (78.4 km^{2})
  - Water: 0.15 sq mi (0.39 km^{2}) 0.49%
- Elevation: 958 ft (292 m)

Population (2010)
  - Estimate (2016): 1,347
  - Density: 45.9/sq mi (17.7/km^{2})
- Time zone: UTC-6 (CST)
  - Summer (DST): UTC-5 (CDT)
- FIPS code: 17-177-65065

Rock Grove Township is located in Stephenson County, Illinois. As of the 2010 census, its population was 1,388 and it contained 761 housing units. The unincorporated community of Rock Grove and part of Lake Summerset are located in the township, and once Duncannon was located here also.

== Geography ==
Rock Grove is Township 28 (part) and 29 North, Range 8 (part) and 9 East of the Fourth Principal Meridian.

According to the 2010 census, the township has a total area of 30.42 square miles (78.8 km^{2}), of which 30.27 square miles (78.4 km^{2}) (or 99.51%) is land and 0.15 square miles (0.39 km^{2}) (or 0.49%) is water.

== Demographics ==
Historical population
Census	Pop.	Note	%±
2016 (est.)	1,347
U.S. Decennial Census
