= Winnebago County, Illinois =

County in Illinois, United States

- County
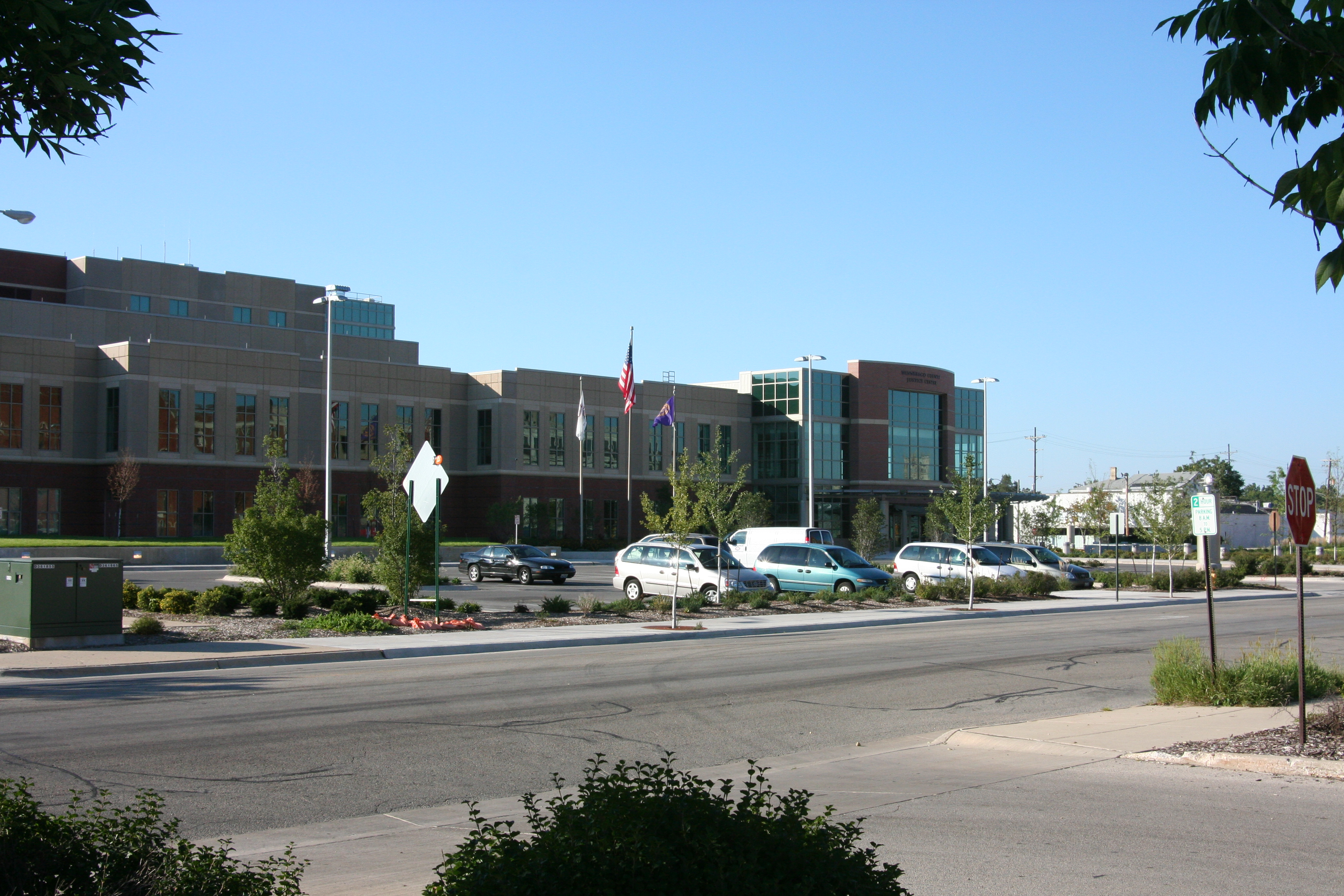
- Winnebago County Justice Center

- Seal

- Location within the U.S. state of Illinois
- Coordinates: 42°20′N 89°10′W
- Country: United States
- State: Illinois
- Founded: January 16, 1836
- Named for: Winnebago (Ho-Chunk) people
- Seat: Rockford
- Largest city: Rockford

Area
  - Total: 519 sq mi (1,340 km^{2})
  - Land: 513 sq mi (1,330 km^{2})
  - Water: 5.9 sq mi (15 km^{2}) 1.1%

Population (2020)
  - Total: 285,350
  - Estimate (2025): 283,674 ▼
  - Density: 556/sq mi (215/km^{2})
- Time zone: UTC−6 (Central)
  - Summer (DST): UTC−5 (CDT)
- Congressional districts: 16th, 17th
- Website: wincoil.gov

Winnebago County is a county located in the U.S. state of Illinois. According to the 2020 census, it had a population of 285,350 making it the seventh most populous county in Illinois behind Cook County and its five surrounding collar counties. Its county seat is Rockford. Winnebago County is the central county of the Rockford metropolitan area.

== History ==
Winnebago County was formed on January 16, 1836, out of Jo Daviess and LaSalle counties. It was named for the Ho-Chunk or Winnebago tribe of Native Americans. At the time the county was founded its inhabitants consisted almost entirely of New Englanders and New England transplants from upstate New York. These were "Yankee" settlers, meaning they were descended from the English Puritans who settled New England during the early 1600s. They made up virtually all of Winnebago County's inhabitants during the first several decades of its history. In this regard the county was similar to most of the northern portion of the state of Illinois, and almost all of the neighboring state of Wisconsin. After the conclusion of the Black Hawk War there was an additional surge of immigration from New England. As a result of this heritage the inhabitants of Winnebago County considered themselves, and functioned as, a cultural expansion of early New England culture. In the presidential election of 1860, Abraham Lincoln won 3,985 votes in Winnebago County, whereas Stephen A. Douglas only won 817 votes.

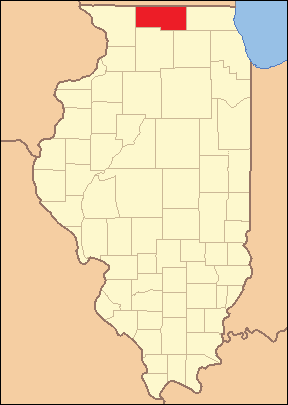
Winnebago County for its first year of existence

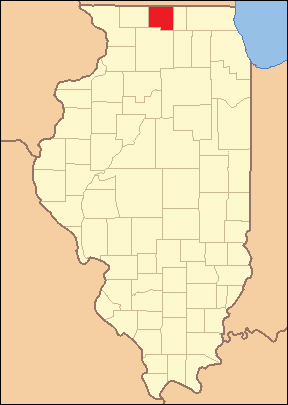
Winnebago County in 1837, reduced to its current borders by the creation of Stephenson and Boone Counties

== Geography ==
According to the U.S. Census Bureau, the county has a total area of 519 square miles (1,340 km^{2}), of which 513 square miles (1,330 km^{2}) is land and 5.9 square miles (15 km^{2}) (1.1%) is water.

=== Climate and weather ===
Rockford, Illinois

Climate chart (precipitation, max. and min. temperature)
J	F	M	A	M	J	J	A	S	O	N	D
1.4 27 11	1.3 33 16	2.4 46 27	3.6 59 37	4 71 48	4.8 80 58	4.1 83 63	4.2 81 61	3.5 74 52	2.6 62 40	2.6 46 29	2.1 32 17
- █ Average max. and min. temperatures in °F
- █ Precipitation totals in inches
- Source: The Weather Channel
Metric conversion
J	F	M	A	M	J	J	A	S	O	N	D
36 −3 −12	34 1 −9	61 8 −3	92 15 3	102 22 9	122 27 14	104 28 17	107 27 16	88 23 11	65 17 4	67 8 −2	52 0 −8
- █ Average max. and min. temperatures in °C
- █ Precipitation totals in mm

In recent years, average temperatures in the county seat of Rockford have ranged from a low of 11 °F (−12 °C) in January to a high of 83 °F (28 °C) in July, although a record low of −27 °F (−33 °C) was recorded in January 1982 and a record high of 112 °F (44 °C) was recorded in July 1936. Average monthly precipitation ranged from 1.34 inches (34 mm) in February to 4.80 inches (122 mm) in June.

=== Major highways ===
- Interstate 39
- Interstate 90
- U.S. Highway 20
- U.S. Highway 51
- Illinois Route 2
- Illinois Route 70
- Illinois Route 75
- Illinois Route 173
- Illinois Route 251

=== Transit ===
- Beloit Transit
- Rockford Mass Transit District
- List of intercity bus stops in Illinois

=== Adjacent counties ===
- Rock County, Wisconsin (north)
- Boone County (east)
- DeKalb County (southeast)
- Ogle County (south)
- Carroll County (southwest)
- Stephenson County (west)
- Green County, Wisconsin (northwest)

== Demographics ==
Historical population
Census	Pop.	Note	%±
1840	4,609		—
1850	11,773		155.4%
1860	24,491		108.0%
1870	29,301		19.6%
1880	30,505		4.1%
1890	39,938		30.9%
1900	47,845		19.8%
1910	63,153		32.0%
1920	90,929		44.0%
1930	117,373		29.1%
1940	121,178		3.2%
1950	152,385		25.8%
1960	209,765		37.7%
1970	246,623		17.6%
1980	250,884		1.7%
1990	252,913		0.8%
2000	278,418		10.1%
2010	295,266		6.1%
2020	285,350		−3.4%
2025 (est.)	283,674	▼	−0.6%
U.S. Decennial Census; 1790–1960 1900–1990; 1990–2000 2010–2019

=== 2020 census ===
As of the 2020 census, the county had a population of 285,350, the median age was 40.0 years, 22.9% of residents were under the age of 18, and 18.0% of residents were 65 years of age or older.

For every 100 females there were 96.0 males, and for every 100 females age 18 and over there were 93.5 males age 18 and over.

The racial makeup of the county was 67.0% White, 13.7% Black or African American, 0.6% American Indian and Alaska Native, 2.8% Asian, <0.1% Native Hawaiian and Pacific Islander, 6.7% from some other race, and 9.2% from two or more races. Hispanic or Latino residents of any race comprised 14.4% of the population.

90.3% of residents lived in urban areas, while 9.7% lived in rural areas.

There were 115,459 households in the county, of which 29.4% had children under the age of 18 living in them. Of all households, 42.6% were married-couple households, 19.8% were households with a male householder and no spouse or partner present, and 29.4% were households with a female householder and no spouse or partner present. About 30.1% of all households were made up of individuals and 12.4% had someone living alone who was 65 years of age or older.

There were 124,983 housing units, of which 7.6% were vacant. Among occupied housing units, 65.2% were owner-occupied and 34.8% were renter-occupied. The homeowner vacancy rate was 1.7% and the rental vacancy rate was 8.8%.

=== 2010 census ===
As of the 2010 census, there were 295,266 people, 115,501 households, and 76,854 families residing in the county. The population density was 575.2 inhabitants per square mile (222.1/km^{2}). There were 125,965 housing units at an average density of 245.4 per square mile (94.7/km^{2}). The racial makeup of the county was 77.4% white, 12.2% black or African American, 2.3% Asian, 0.3% American Indian, 4.9% from other races, and 2.8% from two or more races. Those of Hispanic or Latino origin made up 10.9% of the population. In terms of ancestry, 25.6% were German, 13.5% were Irish, 9.4% were American, 8.7% were Swedish, 8.3% were English, and 7.4% were Italian.

Of the 115,501 households, 33.1% had children under the age of 18 living with them, 47.3% were married couples living together, 14.0% had a female householder with no husband present, 33.5% were non-families, and 27.7% of all households were made up of individuals. The average household size was 2.52 and the average family size was 3.07. The median age was 38.3 years.

The median income for a household in the county was $47,198 and the median income for a family was $59,814. Males had a median income of $48,358 versus $32,103 for females. The per capita income for the county was $24,008. About 11.5% of families and 15.9% of the population were below the poverty line, including 25.0% of those under age 18 and 7.5% of those age 65 or over.

=== Racial and ethnic composition ===
Winnebago County, Illinois – Racial and ethnic composition Note: the US Census treats Hispanic/Latino as an ethnic category. This table excludes Latinos from the racial categories and assigns them to a separate category. Hispanics/Latinos may be of any race.
Race / Ethnicity (NH = Non-Hispanic)	Pop 1980	Pop 1990	Pop 2000	Pop 2010	Pop 2020	% 1980	% 1990	% 2000	% 2010	% 2020
White alone (NH)	222,134	218,403	220,817	214,196	183,235	88.54%	86.35%	79.31%	72.54%	64.21%
Black or African American alone (NH)	20,830	23,053	29,038	35,358	38,240	8.30%	9.11%	10.43%	11.97%	13.40%
Native American or Alaska Native alone (NH)	509	604	584	563	559	0.20%	0.24%	0.21%	0.19%	0.20%
Asian alone (NH)	1,222	2,899	4,719	6,722	7,938	0.49%	1.15%	1.69%	2.28%	2.78%
Native Hawaiian or Pacific Islander alone (NH)	x	x	76	61	66	x	x	0.03%	0.02%	0.02%
Other race alone (NH)	790	183	216	319	1,099	0.31%	0.07%	0.08%	0.11%	0.39%
Mixed race or Multiracial (NH)	x	x	3,762	5,870	13,261	x	x	1.35%	1.99%	4.65%
Hispanic or Latino (any race)	5,399	7,771	19,206	32,177	40,952	2.15%	3.07%	6.90%	10.90%	14.35%
Total	250,884	252,913	278,418	295,266	285,350	100.00%	100.00%	100.00%	100.00%	100.00%

== Communities ==
=== Cities ===
- Loves Park
- Rockford (Seat - partly in Ogle County)
- South Beloit

=== Villages ===
- Cherry Valley
- Durand
- Machesney Park
- New Milford
- Pecatonica
- Rockton
- Roscoe
- Winnebago

=== Census-designated place ===
- Argyle (part)
- Lake Summerset (part)
- Westlake Village

=== Unincorporated communities ===
- Alworth
- Argyle
- Harlem
- Harrison
- Kishwaukee
- Latham Park
- Seward
- Shirland
- Wempletown
- Westfield Corners

=== Townships ===
Winnebago County is divided into these townships:

- Burritt
- Cherry Valley
- Durand
- Harlem
- Harrison
- Laona
- Owen
- Pecatonica
- Rockford
- Rockton
- Roscoe
- Seward
- Shirland
- Winnebago

=== Former Settlement ===
- Camp Grant

== Politics ==
For many years, Winnebago County was rather conservative for an urban county. From the 1850s to 1988, it backed the Republican candidates for president at every election except the national Democratic landslides of 1936 and 1964. In the 1990s, it became a swing county, backing the national winner in every presidential election from 1992 to 2012, though only three did so with a majority and only once by more than six percentage points. In 2016, Hillary Clinton won the county by only 89 votes over Donald Trump, affected by the relatively large third-party vote that year.

Underlining how Republican Winnebago County once was, only three Democrats have represented a significant portion of the county in Congress since the 1850s.

United States presidential election results for Winnebago County, Illinois
Year	Republican		Democratic		Third party(ies)	
Year	No.	%	No.	%	No.	%
1892	5,854	62.50%	2,634	28.12%	878	9.37%
1896	8,242	75.10%	2,447	22.30%	286	2.61%
1900	8,103	72.69%	2,498	22.41%	546	4.90%
1904	8,143	74.80%	1,177	10.81%	1,567	14.39%
1908	8,919	71.54%	2,163	17.35%	1,385	11.11%
1912	2,537	21.32%	2,276	19.12%	7,089	59.56%
1916	14,893	65.04%	6,198	27.07%	1,806	7.89%
1920	19,913	79.23%	3,355	13.35%	1,866	7.42%
1924	21,978	71.32%	2,228	7.23%	6,608	21.44%
1928	33,258	80.39%	7,684	18.57%	430	1.04%
1932	26,632	57.12%	17,707	37.98%	2,286	4.90%
1936	24,997	46.30%	27,200	50.38%	1,792	3.32%
1940	30,683	51.89%	28,061	47.46%	383	0.65%
1944	30,837	52.31%	27,831	47.22%	277	0.47%
1948	29,537	51.54%	27,145	47.36%	631	1.10%
1952	43,468	57.95%	31,409	41.88%	127	0.17%
1956	48,332	62.38%	29,063	37.51%	89	0.11%
1960	49,541	55.20%	40,090	44.67%	110	0.12%
1964	39,920	44.98%	48,834	55.02%	0	0.00%
1968	47,646	52.51%	36,702	40.45%	6,391	7.04%
1972	57,682	61.46%	35,937	38.29%	231	0.25%
1976	52,736	54.15%	42,399	43.54%	2,252	2.31%
1980	48,825	46.46%	32,384	30.82%	23,880	22.72%
1984	64,203	58.66%	44,629	40.78%	619	0.57%
1988	55,699	54.85%	45,280	44.59%	571	0.56%
1992	42,221	37.63%	48,298	43.04%	21,696	19.33%
1996	44,479	44.52%	46,264	46.31%	9,167	9.18%
2000	53,816	49.24%	51,981	47.56%	3,500	3.20%
2004	60,782	50.06%	59,740	49.20%	903	0.74%
2008	53,886	42.53%	70,034	55.27%	2,784	2.20%
2012	55,138	46.18%	61,732	51.70%	2,527	2.12%
2016	55,624	46.33%	55,713	46.41%	8,718	7.26%
2020	60,861	47.49%	64,056	49.98%	3,243	2.53%
2024	59,257	48.56%	59,942	49.13%	2,819	2.31%

== Education ==
School districts include:

- Durand Community Unit School District 322
- Harlem Unit School District 122
- Hiawatha Community Unit School District 426
- Meridian Community Unit School District 223
- North Boone Community Unit School District 200
- Pecatonica Community Unit School District 321
- Rockford School District 205
- South Beloit Community Unit School District 320
- Winnebago Community Unit School District 323

There is one secondary school district with territory in the county: Hononegah Community High School District 207.

Elementary school districts include:

- Kinnikinnick Community Consolidated School District 131
- Prairie Hill Community Consolidated School District 133
- Rockton School District 140
- Shirland Community Consolidated School District 134

== See also ==
- List of counties in Illinois
- National Register of Historic Places listings in Winnebago County, Illinois
- Winnebago County War Memorial
