= Winnebago Township, Illinois =

Winnebago Township
- Township
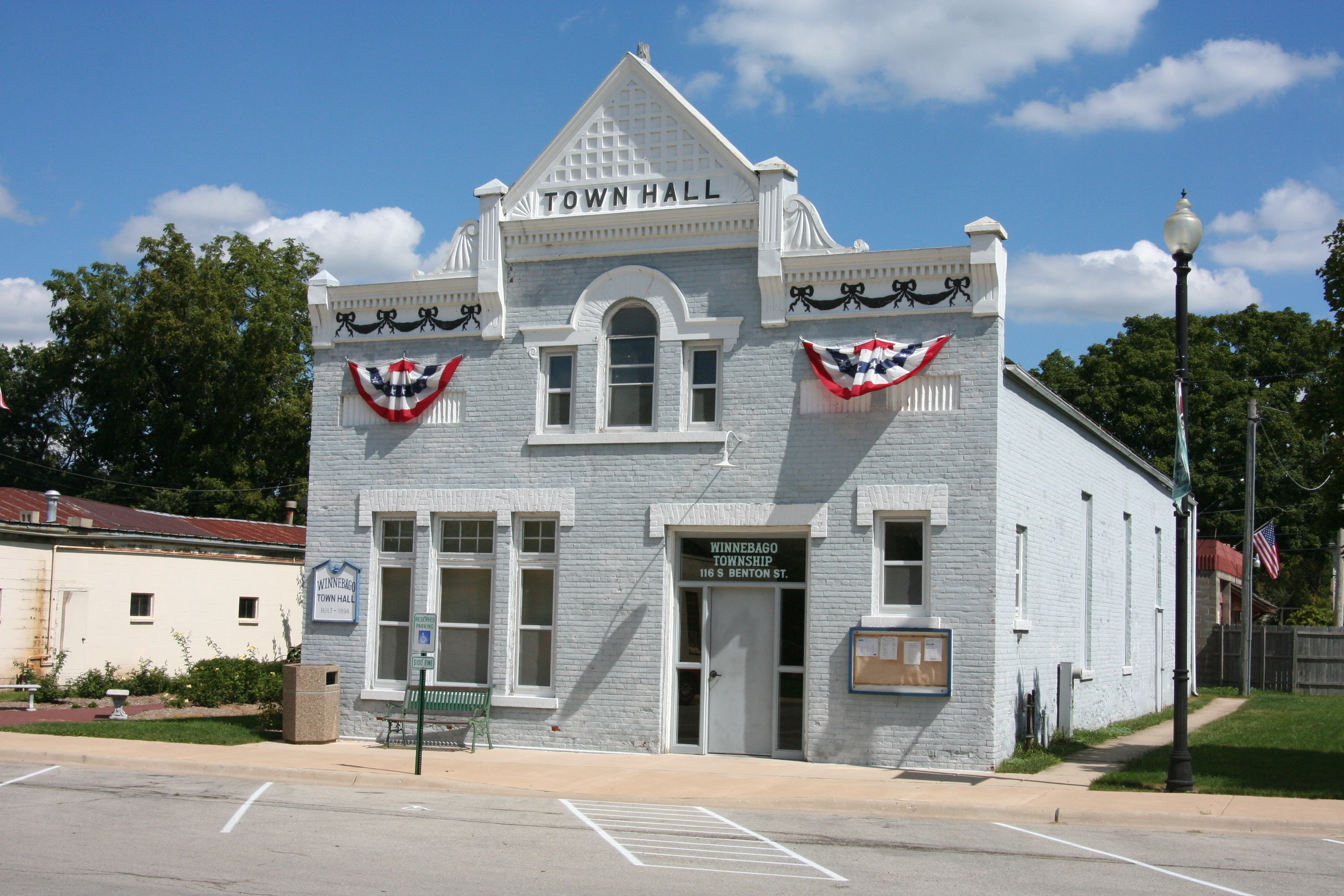
- Township building in Winnebago

- Location in Winnebago County
- Coordinates: 42°14′50″N 89°13′37″W
- Country: United States
- State: Illinois
- County: Winnebago
- Established: November 6, 1849

Government
  - Supervisor: [Leslee Dimke]

Area
  - Total: 33.04 sq mi (85.6 km^{2})
  - Land: 33.04 sq mi (85.6 km^{2})
  - Water: 0 sq mi (0 km^{2}) 0%
- Elevation: 892 ft (272 m)

Population (2010)
  - Estimate (2016): 5,131
  - Density: 160.1/sq mi (61.8/km^{2})
- Time zone: UTC-6 (CST)
  - Summer (DST): UTC-5 (CDT)
- FIPS code: 17-201-82504
- Website: winntwp.com

Winnebago Township is located in Winnebago County, Illinois, United States. As of the 2010 census, its population was 5,291, and it contained 1,976 housing units.

== Geography ==
According to the 2010 census, the township has a total area of 33.04 square miles (85.6 km^{2}), all of which is land.

== Demographics ==
Historical population
Census	Pop.	Note	%±
2016 (est.)	5,131
U.S. Decennial Census
