= Winnebago, Illinois =

Winnebago
- Village
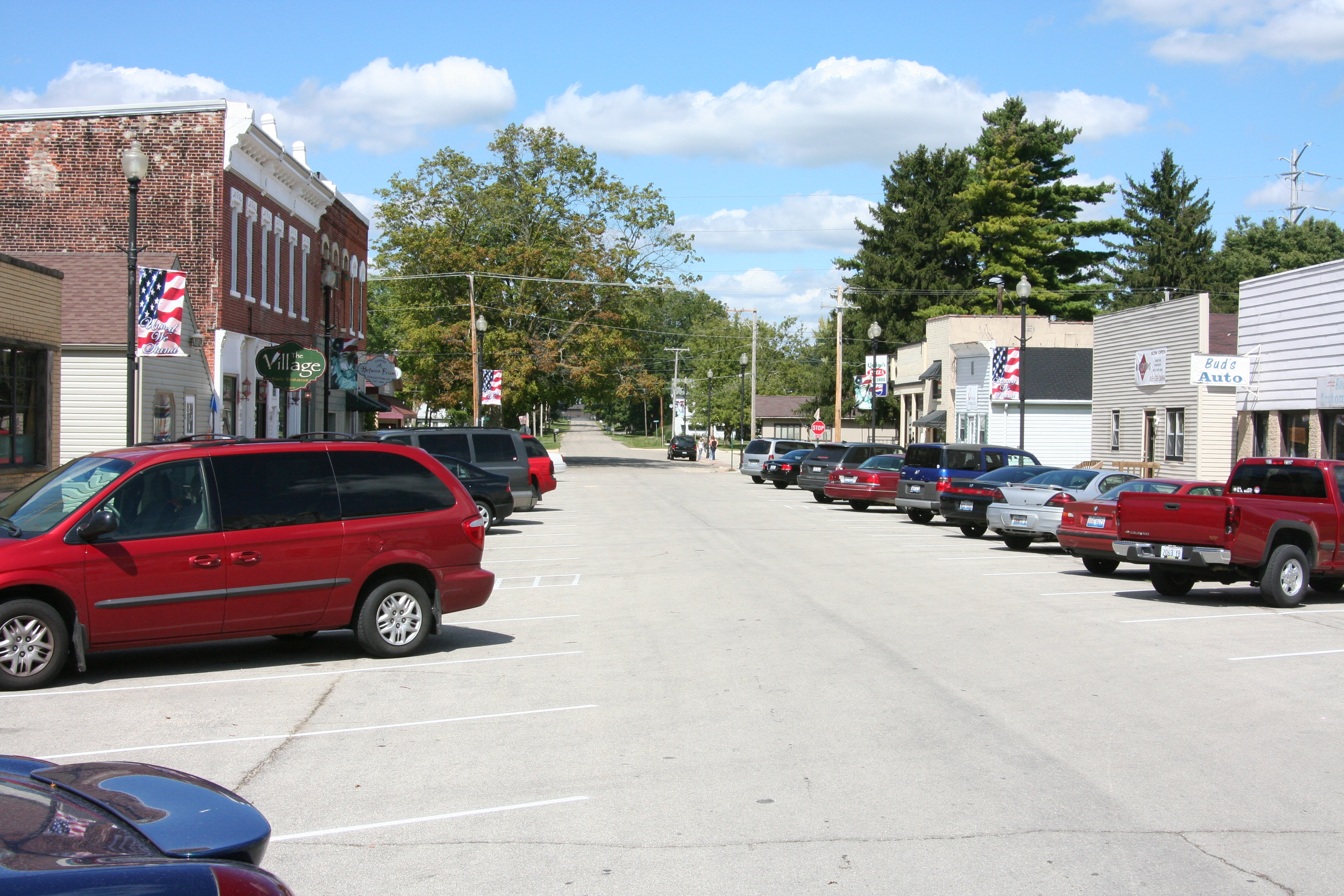
- Looking on the main street of Winnebago
- Nickname: Indians
- Motto: Welcome to Wonderful Winnebago
- Location of Winnebago in Winnebago County, Illinois.
- Coordinates: 42°16′00″N 89°14′36″W
- Country: United States
- State: Illinois
- County: Winnebago
- Township: Winnebago

Area
  - Total: 1.93 sq mi (5.01 km^{2})
  - Land: 1.93 sq mi (5.01 km^{2})
  - Water: 0 sq mi (0.00 km^{2})
- Elevation: 869 ft (265 m)

Population (2020)
  - Total: 2,940
  - Density: 1,520.6/sq mi (587.09/km^{2})
- Time zone: UTC-6 (CST)
  - Summer (DST): UTC-5 (CDT)
- ZIP code: 61088
- Area code: 815
- FIPS code: 17-82491
- GNIS feature ID: 2399716
- Website: http://www.villageofwinnebago.com/

Winnebago is a village in Winnebago County, Illinois. It is part of the Rockford-Winnebago Metropolitan Statistical Area. The population was 2,940 at the 2020 census.

== History ==
James Weber Linn (1876–1939), educator and politician, was born in Winnebago.

== Geography ==
According to the 2010 census, Winnebago has a total area of 1.95 square miles (5.05 km^{2}), all land.

== Demographics ==
Historical population
Census	Pop.	Note	%±
1880	504		—
1890	464		−7.9%
1900	405		−12.7%
1910	415		2.5%
1920	495		19.3%
1930	588		18.8%
1940	637		8.3%
1950	752		18.1%
1960	1,059		40.8%
1970	1,285		21.3%
1980	1,644		27.9%
1990	1,840		11.9%
2000	2,958		60.8%
2010	3,101		4.8%
2020	2,940		−5.2%
U.S. Decennial Census

=== 2020 census ===
As of the 2020 census, Winnebago had a population of 2,940. The median age was 41.5 years. 23.9% of residents were under the age of 18 and 16.7% of residents were 65 years of age or older. For every 100 females there were 93.2 males, and for every 100 females age 18 and over there were 92.3 males age 18 and over.

0.0% of residents lived in urban areas, while 100.0% lived in rural areas.

There were 1,122 households in Winnebago, of which 34.7% had children under the age of 18 living in them. Of all households, 58.7% were married-couple households, 13.4% were households with a male householder and no spouse or partner present, and 22.5% were households with a female householder and no spouse or partner present. About 22.8% of all households were made up of individuals and 12.2% had someone living alone who was 65 years of age or older.

There were 1,196 housing units, of which 6.2% were vacant. The homeowner vacancy rate was 0.8% and the rental vacancy rate was 15.0%.

Racial composition as of the 2020 census
Race	Number	Percent
White	2,675	91.0%
Black or African American	33	1.1%
American Indian and Alaska Native	5	0.2%
Asian	19	0.6%
Native Hawaiian and Other Pacific Islander	0	0.0%
Some other race	24	0.8%
Two or more races	184	6.3%
Hispanic or Latino (of any race)	91	3.1%

=== 2000 census ===
As of the census of 2000, there were 3,000 people, 1,009 households, and 841 families residing in the village. The population density was 1,500 inhabitants per square mile (580/km^{2}). There were 1,023 housing units at an average density of 735.0 per square mile (283.8/km^{2}). The racial makeup of the village was 98.14% White, 1.12% African American, 0.03% Native American, 0.30% Asian, and 0.41% from two or more races. Hispanic or Latino of any race were 1.18% of the population.

There were 1,009 households, out of which 50.3% had children under the age of 18 living with them, 69.9% were married couples living together, 10.7% had a female householder with no husband present, and 16.6% were non-families. 14.1% of all households were made up of individuals, and 7.2% had someone living alone who was 65 years of age or older. The average household size was 2.93 and the average family size was 3.24.

In the village, the population was spread out, with 34.3% under the age of 18, 5.7% from 18 to 24, 32.6% from 25 to 44, 19.1% from 45 to 64, and 8.3% who were 65 years of age or older. The median age was 34 years. For every 100 females, there were 94.1 males. For every 100 females age 18 and over, there were 90.8 males.

The median income for a household in the village was $59,891, and the median income for a family was $62,685. Males had a median income of $44,851 versus $25,817 for females. The per capita income for the village was $21,019. About 0.9% of families and 1.1% of the population were below the poverty line, including 1.0% of those under age 18 and 3.9% of those age 65 or over.

== Education ==
Students in Winnebago are served by Winnebago CUSD#323. The district has one high school, one middle school and two elementary schools.
