= William Lowry House =

William Lowry House may refer to:

in the United States (by state)

- William Lowry House (Bentonville, Indiana), listed on the National Register of Historic Places in Fayette County, Indiana
- William C. Lowry House Nicholasville, Kentucky, listed on the National Register of Historic Places in Jessamine County, Kentucky
- William Lowry House (Athens, Tennessee), listed on the National Register of Historic Places in McMinn County, Tennessee

== See also ==
- Lowry House (disambiguation)
