= Fayette County, Indiana =

County in Indiana, United States

- County
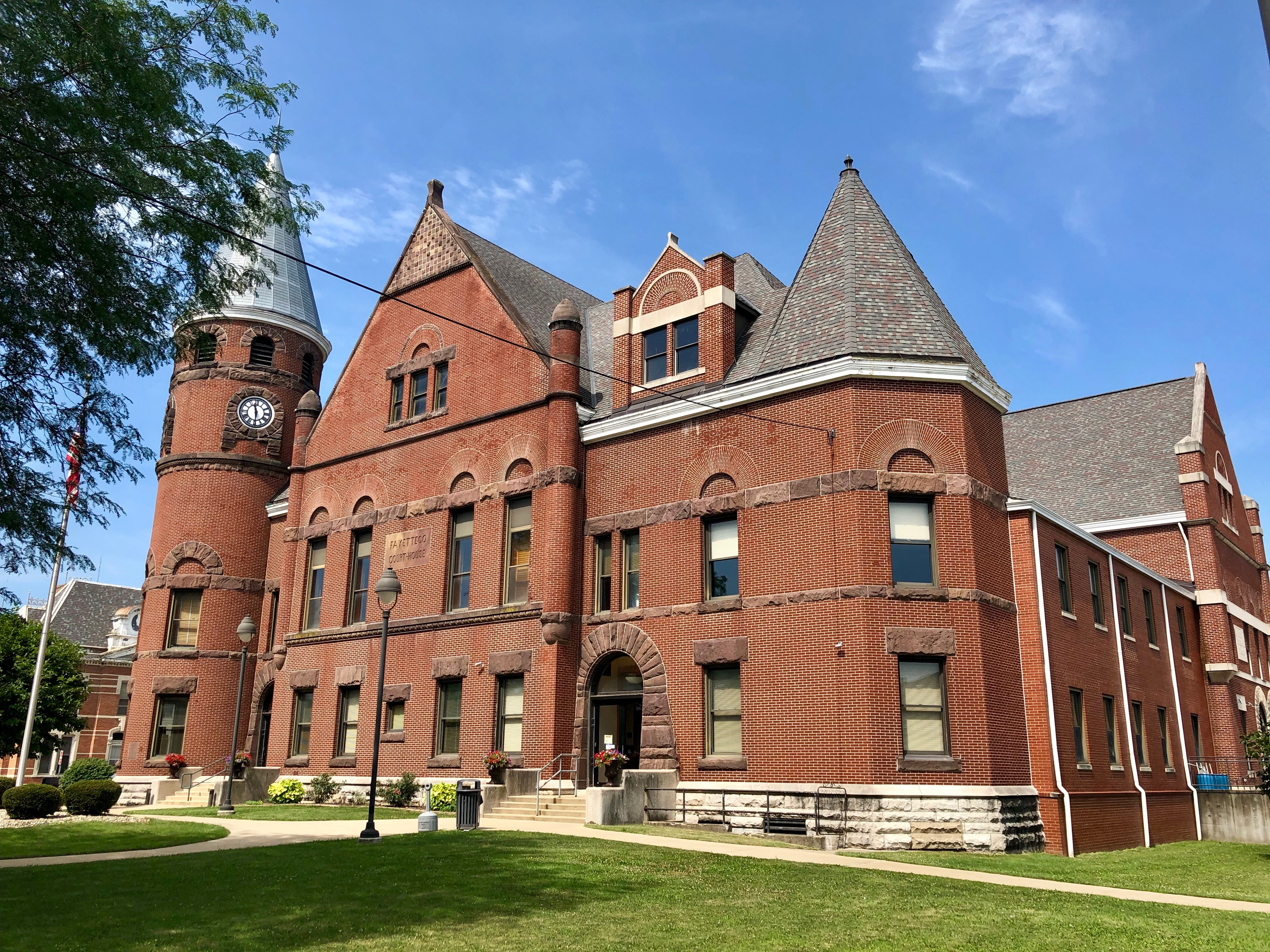
- Fayette County Courthouse in Connersville

- Location within the U.S. state of Indiana
- Coordinates: 39°38′N 85°11′W
- Country: United States
- State: Indiana
- Founded: 1819
- Named for: Marquis de la Fayette
- Seat: Connersville
- Largest city: Connersville

Area
  - Total: 215.16 sq mi (557.3 km^{2})
  - Land: 215.01 sq mi (556.9 km^{2})
  - Water: 0.15 sq mi (0.39 km^{2}) 0.07%

Population (2020)
  - Total: 23,398
  - Estimate (2025): 23,533 ▲
  - Density: 108.82/sq mi (42.017/km^{2})
- Time zone: UTC−5 (Eastern)
  - Summer (DST): UTC−4 (EDT)
- Congressional district: 6th
- Website: Fayette County Website
- Indiana county number 21

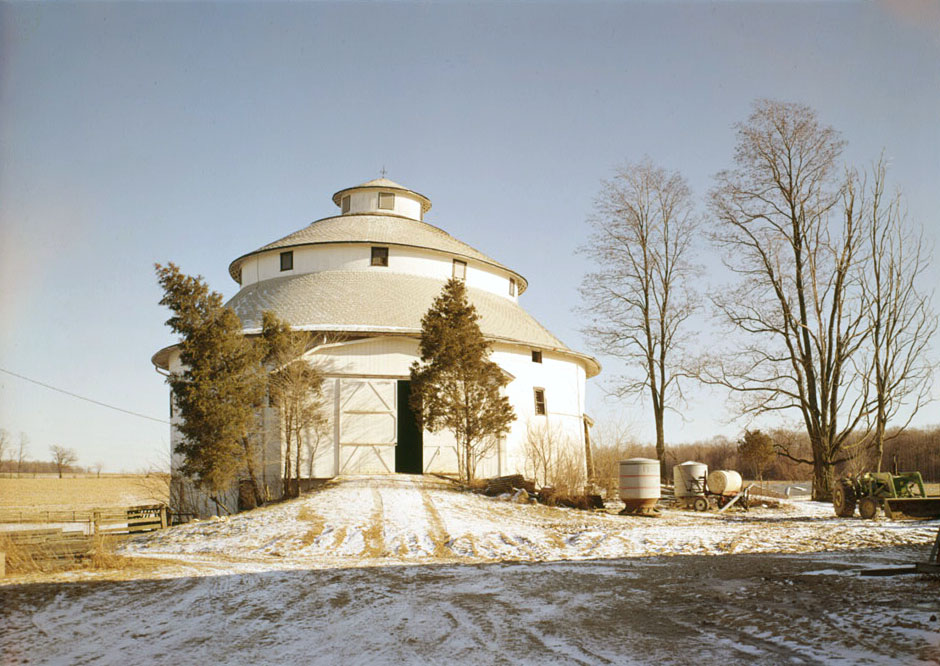
A round barn in Fayette County

Fayette County, located in the east central portion of the U.S. state of Indiana, is one of 92 counties in the state. As of 2020, the population was 23,398. Most of the county is rural; land use is farms, pasture and unincorporated woodland. The county seat and only incorporated town is Connersville, which holds a majority of the county's population.

The county was historically significant early in the 19th century as a conduit for settlement of the Northwest Territory, and again in the early 20th century as an automotive manufacturing center, but has been in economic decline since the 1960s and is now among the poorest counties in the state. Most employment is retail, schools, and healthcare.

The county lacks a commercial airport and bus service, and has no major (U.S. or Interstate) highways.

The county was created in 1818 from portions of Wayne and Franklin counties and unincorporated ("New Purchase") territory.

Fayette County comprises the Connersville, IN Micropolitan Statistical Area.

== History ==
The county and its seat Connersville rose from unincorporated territory surrounding an isolated trading post on the Whitewater River to the principal conduit for settlement of northern and central Indiana, Michigan, Wisconsin and Illinois during the early 19th century, to an automotive manufacturing powerhouse in the first half of the 20th century, suffered recession and post-war industrial revival before declining to one of the poorest counties in Indiana and the central midwest. After early settlement, during industrial growth, the county's population concentrated in the town of Connersville. In 1841, Connersville became the first, and remains the only, incorporated town (chartered as a city in 1869) in the county.

=== Native American cultures ===
The oldest civilizations in the Fayette County area, known as Mound Builders, occupied the area between 2,000 and 3,000 years ago. They are known for their distinctive earthen mounds which can be found throughout the area, as well as a variety of metal and pottery artifacts left behind in those mounds across Indiana and Ohio.

Nomadic Miami, Shawnee, and Potawatomi peoples inhabited the area when European explorers arrived and began to form settlements, between the 1670s and early 1800s, and were in the area for at least two hundred years prior to the earliest European explorers. The Delaware Indians, displaced from their ancestral homelands in the east, would later migrate to the Whitewater Valley.

=== Indiana Territory ===
At the organization of the Indiana Territory from the Northwest Territory in 1800, the Northwest Territory including present day Indiana was divided between Knox County (seat Vincennes) in the south, and Wayne County, including northern Ohio (seat Detroit) north of Fort Wayne in the north. By the Ohio Enabling Act of 1802 settlers in the Whitewater valley became citizens of the Indiana Territory and residents of Clark county, which had been organized from the eastern part of Knox in 1801, with the county seat at Falls of the Ohio, later called Clarksville.

On September 30, 1809, the United States, on behalf of the Northwest Territory and Governor William Henry Harrison, concluded the Treaty of Fort Wayne, part of whose terms included the purchase from the Indians of a strip of land locally called "The 12 Mile Purchase" parallel to and west of "The Gore", enclosing the Whitewater Valley and comprising the largest portion of the future county. Conclusion of the treaty essentially ended Indian occupation of the county and cleared the way for settlement.

In southeastern Indiana, a part of the Northwest Territory nicknamed "The Gore" was ceded from Ohio to Indiana in 1803 and became Dearborn County. Wayne and Franklin counties were carved from Dearborn and Clark counties in 1811. At that time much of southeastern Indiana was divided between the two latter counties.

=== The County ===
Fayette County was created by act of the Indiana General Assembly in December 1818 from portions of Wayne and Franklin counties and unincorporated ("New Purchase") territory in the northern portion of the county. It was named for the Marquis de la Fayette, a French hero of the Revolutionary War. Connersville, then a small village of less than a hundred inhabitants, was designated the county seat. The county was divided into five townships (Harrison, Connersville, Jennings, Columbia, and Brownsville) in February 1819, Connersville Township containing the namesake town. In 1821, the organization of Waterloo Township subsumed the portion of Brownsville Township remaining in Fayette County, along with a portion of Harrison Township west of the Whitewater River.

The far eastern part of Fayette lying between the Treaty of Greenville treaty line of 1795 and the present eastern boundary line of Waterloo and Jennings townships was split off into the newly created Union County in 1821. In 1826, a small part in the southeastern portion of Jackson township not included in the limits of the county in 1818, being left a part of Franklin county, was attached to Fayette County.

Four additional townships were created in later years: Posey (1823), Orange (1822), Jackson (1820) and Fairview (1851), corresponding to settlement of the area.

=== Settlement of the Whitewater Valley ===
At the time of its organization in 1819, the county had approximately 3,000 residents. Two major events spurred early growth: the completion of the Whitewater Canal in 1847, and the arrival of the Cincinnati, Hamilton and Indianapolis Railroad through Connersville in 1862.

=== Automotive manufacturing ===
Economic productivity in the county, except for farming, has been centered almost exclusively in the one town of Connersville.

The automotive era of Connersville began in 1909, when the McFarlan first went into production. The following year, Lexington moved its plant to Connersville from its namesake city in Kentucky. Next came Empire, which built the Little Aristocrat. After Lexington went bankrupt in 1926, Auburn production moved to a factory complex known as Auburn Central. The “Baby Duesenberg” designed in Connersville eventually became the Cord 810 and 812. Connersville also was home to suppliers, including Central Manufacturing, which made bodywork for the 1940 Packard Darrin, along with some 500,000 Jeep bodies during World War II.

== Geography ==
According to the 2010 census, the county has a total area of 215.16 square miles (557.3 km^{2}), of which 215.01 square miles (556.9 km^{2}) (or 99.93%) is land and 0.15 square miles (0.39 km^{2}) (or 0.07%) is water. It is almost 14 mi. wide at its widest east–west span, and 19 mi. long (through Posey township). The county is located in the northern portion of the Whitewater River Valley running south and southeasterly from Wayne County to Cincinnati on the Ohio River. The only major waterway in the county is the West Fork of the Whitewater River running north to south through the center of the county. There is only a single tiny (15 acre) lake in the county, Manlove's Lake in Posey Township. The county is mostly flat with low, rolling hills. The county (and all of Indiana) is part of the Eastern (U.S.) Broadleaf Forest biome dominated by deciduous trees including over 175 native species of oak. Most of the land use is farms (>80%), vacant woodland and pasture. The most common crops are corn and soybeans.

=== Adjacent counties ===
- Henry County (north)
- Wayne County (northeast)
- Union County (east)
- Franklin County (south)
- Rush County (west)

== Political subdivisions ==
=== Townships ===
- Columbia
- Connersville
- Fairview
- Harrison
- Jackson
- Jennings
- Orange
- Posey
- Waterloo

=== Cities and towns ===
- Connersville

=== Unincorporated towns ===
- Alquina
- Alpine
- Bentonville
- Columbia
- Everton
- Glenwood
- Falmouth in Fayette and Rush counties
- Fairview in Fayette and Rush counties
- Harrisburg
- Lyonsville
- Nulltown
- Orange
- Springersville
- Tyner Crossing, NW of Connersville near Harrisburg
- Waterloo

== Transportation ==
Major markets are remote; the nearest large cities are Cincinnati 58 miles (93 km) to the southeast, Indianapolis 66 miles (106 km) to the west, Louisville 127 miles (204 km) to the south, and Columbus, Ohio, 135 miles (217 km) to the northeast.

=== Major highways ===
The accessible state roads are all 2-lane roads. The nearest major highways are U.S. 40 12 miles (19 km) to the north, and Interstate 70 14 miles (23 km) to the north, both in Henry and Wayne Counties. Three major state roads all pass through Connersville:

- Indiana State Road 1
- Indiana State Road 44
- Indiana State Road 121

=== Airport, rail and bus ===
There is no commercial airport or bus service in the county. Amtrak passenger trains serve Connersville. Fayette County has CSX freight service in Connersville.

=== Waterways ===
Whitewater River, the only significant waterway in the county, is not commercially navigable.

== Recreation ==
Robert's Park is a city park in Connersville providing pool, clubhouse, field, and grandstand facilities. The Whitewater Valley Railroad is a heritage railroad providing sightseeing tours between Connersville and Metamora. Manlove Lake near Milton, is a small lake and recreation area providing limited fishing and boating.

== Economy ==
In 2010, the county ranked 92nd out of 92 Indiana counties in median household income. Most of the economic activity is local manufacturing, retail trade and healthcare services, concentrated in Connersville.

== Climate and weather ==
Connersville, Indiana

Climate chart (precipitation, max. and min. temperature)
J	F	M	A	M	J	J	A	S	O	N	D
2.4 32 15	2.3 37 18	3.4 48 27	4.2 60 36	4.9 71 48	4.4 79 57	4.2 83 61	3.5 81 58	2.8 75 50	2.8 64 38	3.6 50 30	3.1 38 21
- █ Average max. and min. temperatures in °F
- █ Precipitation totals in inches
- Source: The Weather Channel
Metric conversion
J	F	M	A	M	J	J	A	S	O	N	D
62 0 −9	59 3 −8	85 9 −3	106 16 2	124 22 9	112 26 14	106 28 16	89 27 14	71 24 10	71 18 3	90 10 −1	77 3 −6
- █ Average max. and min. temperatures in °C
- █ Precipitation totals in mm

In recent years, average temperatures in Connersville have ranged from a low of 15 °F (−9 °C) in January to a high of 83 °F (28 °C) in July, although a record low of −31 °F (−35 °C) was recorded in January 1994 and a record high of 102 °F (39 °C) was recorded in July 1952. Average monthly precipitation ranged from 2.33 inches (59 mm) in February to 4.89 inches (124 mm) in May.

== Schools and colleges ==
The county is served by the Fayette County School system including elementary, middle and high schools. There are also a few parochial elementary schools in Connersville. Both Ivy Tech Community College of Indiana and Indiana University East offer classes in Connersville.

== Government ==
The county government is a constitutional body, and is granted specific powers by the Constitution of Indiana, and by the Indiana Code.

County Council: The county council is the legislative branch of the county government and controls all the spending and revenue collection in the county. Representatives are elected from county districts. The council members serve four-year terms. They are responsible for setting salaries, the annual budget, and special spending. The council also has limited authority to impose local taxes, in the form of an income and property tax that is subject to state level approval, excise taxes, and service taxes.

Board of Commissioners: The executive body of the county is made of a board of commissioners. The commissioners are elected county-wide, in staggered terms, and each serves a four-year term. One of the commissioners, typically the most senior, serves as president. The commissioners are charged with executing the acts legislated by the council, collecting revenue, and managing the day-to-day functions of the county government.

Court: The county maintains a small claims court that can handle some civil cases. The judge on the court is elected to a term of four years and must be a member of the Indiana Bar Association. The judge is assisted by a constable who is also elected to a four-year term. In some cases, court decisions can be appealed to the state level circuit court.

County Officials: The county has several other elected offices, including sheriff, coroner, auditor, treasurer, recorder, surveyor, and circuit court clerk. Each of these elected officers serves a term of four years and oversees a different part of county government. Members elected to county government positions are required to declare party affiliations and to be residents of the county.

Fayette County is part of Indiana's 6th congressional district; Indiana Senate district 42 and Indiana House of Representatives district 55.

United States presidential election results for Fayette County, Indiana
Year	Republican		Democratic		Third party(ies)	
Year	No.	%	No.	%	No.	%
1888	1,953	56.64%	1,471	42.66%	24	0.70%
1892	1,813	53.06%	1,495	43.75%	109	3.19%
1896	2,145	56.70%	1,609	42.53%	29	0.77%
1900	2,320	58.17%	1,600	40.12%	68	1.71%
1904	2,414	58.01%	1,487	35.74%	260	6.25%
1908	2,394	55.77%	1,700	39.60%	199	4.64%
1912	1,030	25.63%	1,455	36.20%	1,534	38.17%
1916	2,360	51.51%	2,074	45.26%	148	3.23%
1920	4,742	54.27%	3,768	43.12%	228	2.61%
1924	5,284	62.16%	2,940	34.58%	277	3.26%
1928	5,874	62.63%	3,455	36.84%	50	0.53%
1932	4,867	47.93%	5,148	50.70%	139	1.37%
1936	5,067	46.39%	5,756	52.70%	99	0.91%
1940	5,567	49.94%	5,542	49.72%	38	0.34%
1944	5,603	51.23%	5,299	48.45%	36	0.33%
1948	5,399	47.62%	5,876	51.83%	63	0.56%
1952	7,000	57.05%	5,178	42.20%	92	0.75%
1956	6,673	56.26%	5,156	43.47%	33	0.28%
1960	6,729	55.97%	5,246	43.63%	48	0.40%
1964	4,637	40.70%	6,713	58.92%	43	0.38%
1968	5,286	46.92%	4,549	40.38%	1,431	12.70%
1972	7,273	67.16%	3,519	32.50%	37	0.34%
1976	5,704	50.53%	5,519	48.89%	65	0.58%
1980	6,004	55.94%	4,304	40.10%	424	3.95%
1984	7,142	62.95%	4,122	36.33%	82	0.72%
1988	5,949	58.85%	4,118	40.74%	41	0.41%
1992	4,376	40.86%	3,969	37.06%	2,365	22.08%
1996	4,091	44.86%	3,822	41.91%	1,207	13.23%
2000	5,060	58.52%	3,415	39.49%	172	1.99%
2004	5,761	60.85%	3,626	38.30%	81	0.86%
2008	4,917	51.87%	4,389	46.30%	173	1.83%
2012	5,045	57.09%	3,555	40.23%	237	2.68%
2016	6,839	71.25%	2,252	23.46%	507	5.28%
2020	7,755	76.43%	2,237	22.05%	154	1.52%
2024	7,625	77.32%	2,084	21.13%	153	1.55%

== Demographics ==
Historical population
Census	Pop.	Note	%±
1820	5,950		—
1830	9,112		53.1%
1840	9,837		8.0%
1850	10,217		3.9%
1860	10,225		0.1%
1870	10,476		2.5%
1880	11,394		8.8%
1890	12,630		10.8%
1900	13,495		6.8%
1910	14,415		6.8%
1920	17,142		18.9%
1930	19,243		12.3%
1940	19,411		0.9%
1950	23,391		20.5%
1960	24,454		4.5%
1970	26,216		7.2%
1980	28,272		7.8%
1990	26,015		−8.0%
2000	25,588		−1.6%
2010	24,277		−5.1%
2020	23,398		−3.6%
2025 (est.)	23,533	▲	0.6%
U.S. Decennial Census; 1790-1960 1900-1990; 1990-2000 2010-2013

=== Racial and ethnic composition ===
Fayette County, Indiana – Racial and ethnic composition Note: the US Census treats Hispanic/Latino as an ethnic category. This table excludes Latinos from the racial categories and assigns them to a separate category. Hispanics/Latinos may be of any race.
Race / Ethnicity (NH = Non-Hispanic)	Pop 1980	Pop 1990	Pop 2000	Pop 2010	Pop 2020	% 1980	% 1990	% 2000	% 2010	% 2020
White alone (NH)	27,571	25,392	24,773	23,392	22,014	97.52%	97.61%	96.81%	96.35%	94.08%
Black or African American alone (NH)	459	434	428	318	275	1.62%	1.67%	1.67%	1.31%	1.18%
Native American or Alaska Native alone (NH)	27	35	19	30	32	0.10%	0.13%	0.07%	0.12%	0.14%
Asian alone (NH)	59	68	68	79	58	0.21%	0.26%	0.27%	0.33%	0.25%
Native Hawaiian or Pacific Islander alone (NH)	x	x	3	0	2	x	x	0.01%	0.00%	0.01%
Other race alone (NH)	24	3	12	15	48	0.08%	0.01%	0.05%	0.06%	0.21%
Mixed race or Multiracial (NH)	x	x	153	220	696	x	x	0.60%	0.91%	2.97%
Hispanic or Latino (any race)	132	83	132	223	273	0.47%	0.32%	0.52%	0.92%	1.17%
Total	28,272	26,015	25,588	24,277	23,398	100.00%	100.00%	100.00%	100.00%	100.00%

=== 2020 census ===
As of the 2020 census, the county had a population of 23,398. The median age was 43.8 years. 21.7% of residents were under the age of 18 and 21.3% of residents were 65 years of age or older. For every 100 females there were 96.6 males, and for every 100 females age 18 and over there were 95.3 males age 18 and over.

The racial makeup of the county was 94.4% White, 1.2% Black or African American, 0.1% American Indian and Alaska Native, 0.3% Asian, less than 0.1% Native Hawaiian and Pacific Islander, 0.6% from some other race, and 3.4% from two or more races. Hispanic or Latino residents of any race comprised 1.2% of the population.

61.5% of residents lived in urban areas, while 38.5% lived in rural areas.

There were 9,720 households in the county, of which 27.9% had children under the age of 18 living in them. Of all households, 45.2% were married-couple households, 19.2% were households with a male householder and no spouse or partner present, and 26.5% were households with a female householder and no spouse or partner present. About 29.3% of all households were made up of individuals and 13.6% had someone living alone who was 65 years of age or older.

There were 10,886 housing units, of which 10.7% were vacant. Among occupied housing units, 68.5% were owner-occupied and 31.5% were renter-occupied. The homeowner vacancy rate was 2.4% and the rental vacancy rate was 8.8%.

=== 2010 Census Data ===
As of the 2010 United States census, there were 24,277 people, 9,719 households, and 6,669 families residing in the county. The population density was 112.9 inhabitants per square mile (43.6/km^{2}). There were 10,898 housing units at an average density of 50.7 per square mile (19.6/km^{2}). The racial makeup of the county was 96.9% white, 1.3% black or African American, 0.3% Asian, 0.1% American Indian, 0.3% from other races, and 1.0% from two or more races. Those of Hispanic or Latino origin made up 0.9% of the population. In terms of ancestry, 20.4% were German, 15.2% were American, 11.8% were Irish, and 8.2% were English.

Of the 9,719 households, 31.9% had children under the age of 18 living with them, 50.6% were married couples living together, 12.4% had a female householder with no husband present, 31.4% were non-families, and 26.6% of all households were made up of individuals. The average household size was 2.46 and the average family size was 2.93. The median age was 40.8 years.

The median income for a household in the county was $47,697 and the median income for a family was $46,601. Males had a median income of $41,211 versus $29,388 for females. The per capita income for the county was $18,928. About 11.9% of families and 19.4% of the population were below the poverty line, including 26.0% of those under age 18 and 9.9% of those age 65 or over.

=== 2000 Census Data ===
As of the census of 2000, there were 25,588 people, 10,199 households, and 7,149 families residing in the county. The population density was 119 people per square mile (46 people/km^{2}). There were 10,981 housing units at an average density of 51 per square mile (20/km^{2}). The racial makeup of the county was 97.16% White, 1.67% Black or African American, 0.09% Native American, 0.27% Asian, 0.02% Pacific Islander, 0.13% from other races, and 0.66% from two or more races. 0.52% of the population were Hispanic or Latino of any race. 39.2% were of American, 18.9% German, 10.6% English and 9.7% Irish ancestry according to Census 2000.

There were 10,199 households, out of which 30.80% had children under the age of 18 living with them, 55.60% were married couples living together, 10.20% had a female householder with no husband present, and 29.90% were non-families. 25.80% of all households were made up of individuals, and 12.30% had someone living alone who was 65 years of age or older. The average household size was 2.46 and the average family size was 2.94.

In the county, the population was spread out, with 24.30% under the age of 18, 8.60% from 18 to 24, 27.10% from 25 to 44, 24.50% from 45 to 64, and 15.50% who were 65 years of age or older. The median age was 38 years. For every 100 females there were 94.00 males. For every 100 females age 18 and over, there were 90.70 males.

The median income for a household in the county was $38,840, and the median income for a family was $46,111. Males had a median income of $34,493 versus $23,082 for females. The per capita income for the county was $18,624. About 6.00% of families and 7.90% of the population were below the poverty line, including 8.40% of those under age 18 and 7.70% of those age 65 or over.

== Notable people ==
- Howard Garns, born in Connersville in 1905 and known as the inventor of Number Place, which would become later known as Sudoku.
- William Grose, Civil War general and Indiana State Senator grew up here.
- George Washington Steele, first Governor of Oklahoma Territory.
- Robert Wise, a movie producer and director who grew up in Connersville, became president of the Directors Guild of America (1971–1975) and president of the Academy of Motion Picture Arts and Sciences (1984–1987).

== See also ==
- McFarlan Automobile
- National Register of Historic Places listings in Fayette County, Indiana
- Thomas Ranck Round Barn
- Edward E. Moore, Indiana state senator and Los Angeles City Council member
