= Lowry House =

Lowry House may refer to:

in the United States (by state then cite)

- Lowry House (Huntsville, Alabama), listed on the National Register of Historic Places (NRHP)
- Lowry Pueblo, Pleasant View, Colorado, a U.S. National Historic Landmark in Montezuma County, Colorado
- William Lowry House (Bentonville, Indiana), listed on the National Register of Historic Places in Fayette County, Indiana
- William C. Lowry House Nicholasville, Kentucky, listed on the National Register of Historic Places in Jessamine County, Kentucky
- William Lowry House (Athens, Tennessee), listed on the National Register of Historic Places in McMinn County, Tennessee
- James Lowry House, Greeneville, Tennessee, listed on the National Register of Historic Places in Greene County, Tennessee
- Smith-Marcuse-Lowry House, Austin, Texas, listed on the NRHP in Harris County, Texas
- Fayette C. Lowry House, Houston, Texas, listed on the National Register of Historic Places in Harris County, Texas
- Robert Lowry House (Lewisburg, Pennsylvania)

== See also ==
- William Lowry House (disambiguation)
