= University of Illinois round barns =

- University of Illinois Experimental Round Barns
- U.S. Historic district – Contributing property
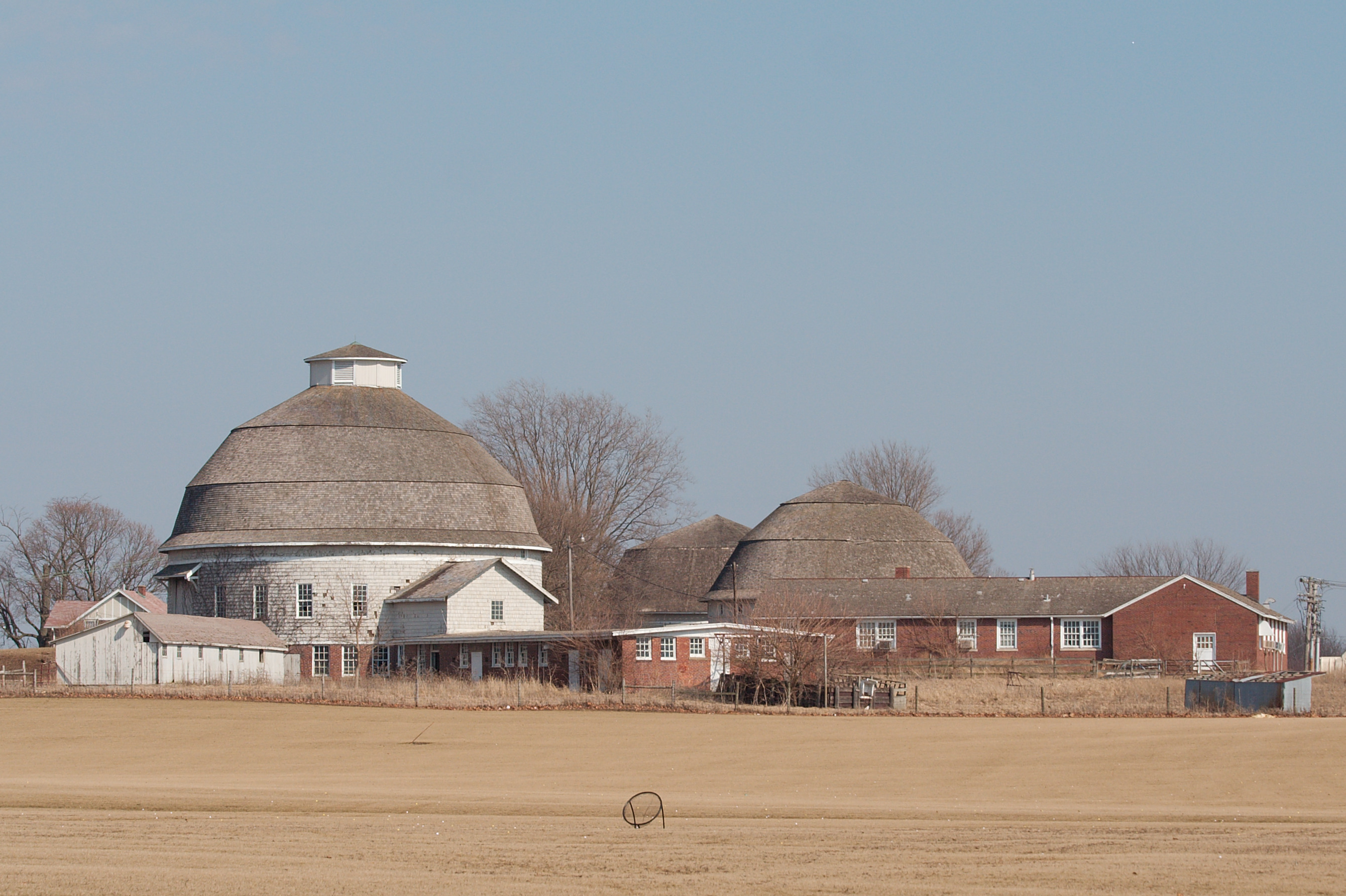
- University of Illinois round barns
- Nearest city: Urbana, Champaign County, Illinois, U.S.
- Coordinates: 40°5′40″N 88°13′22″W
- Built: 1907–1913
- Architect: Kell & Bernard, James M. White
- Architectural style: Round barns
- Part of: University of Illinois Experimental Dairy Farm Historic District (ID94000030)
- MPS: MPL001 – Round Barns in Illinois Thematic Resources
- Designated CP: February 4, 1994

The three University of Illinois round barns played a special role in the promotion and popularity of the American round barn. They are located in Urbana Township, on the border of the U.S. city of Urbana, Illinois and on the campus of the University of Illinois Urbana-Champaign. The University of Illinois was home to one of the Agricultural Experiment Stations, located at U.S. universities, which were at the heart of the promotion of the round barn. At least one round barn in Illinois was built specifically after its owner viewed the barns at the university. Though originally an experiment the three barns helped to lead the way for round barn construction throughout the Midwest, particularly in Illinois. The barns were listed as contributing properties to the U of I Experimental Dairy Farm Historic District, which was listed on the U.S. National Register of Historic Places in 1994.

== History ==
The Agricultural Experiment Station at the University of Illinois was formed in 1888, one year after the Hatch Act provided federal funds. After its initial establishment U of I's College of Agriculture began to grow and it was divided into three distinct components, classroom instruction at U of I, the Agricultural Experiment Station, and a statewide extension service. In 1899 Eugene Davenport replaced George E. Morrow as Dean of the College of Agriculture, he immediately reorganized the college into four departments, agronomy, animal husbandry, dairy husbandry, and horticulture. The Experiment Station was originally established to "administer research activities within the College." The Department of Dairy Husbandry, seeking to increase milk productivity by promoting efficiency, prompted the Experiment Station to construct the Experimental Dairy Farm at an area known as South Farms. The layout and design incorporated three round barns.

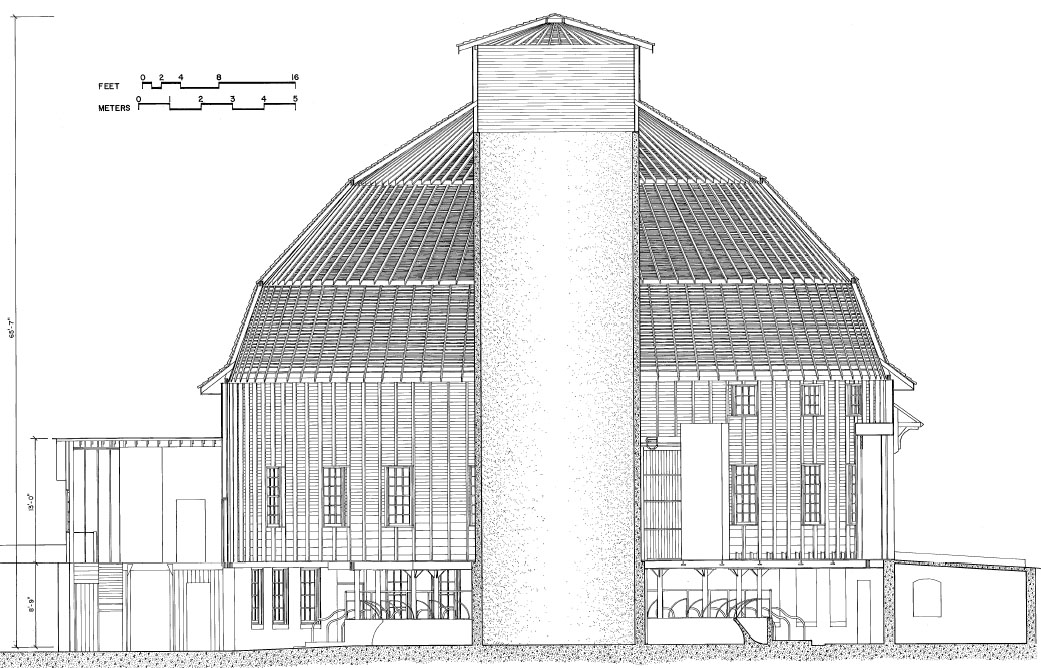
A scale drawing of the 1912 Dairy Experiment Barn.

The three round barns in the historic district were inspired by the work of Benton Steele, Samuel Francis ("Frank") Detraz, Isaac and Emery McNamee, and Horace Duncan, who, in various combinations, had built at least 8 round barns in Indiana by mid-1902. Steele was an aggressive marketer of the circular barn concept, and in early 1902 began advertising in various agricultural newsletters. In 1903 his concepts caught the attention of Professor C. B. Dorsey of the University of Illinois Agricultural Experiment Station, who traveled to Indiana to view the barns built by Steele and his associates. Dorsey was apparently impressed, for he hired Steele and Detraz to construct a barn on his farm in Gilberts, Illinois. By 1908 Dorsey's interest in round barns had caught the eye of his University of Illinois colleague Wilber J. Fraser. Fraser was the first head of the Department of Dairy Husbandry from 1902–1913. He was also a strong advocate of the round barn which he said offered the "economy of consideration, low maintenance, and labor efficiency." Fraser asserted that round barns had a better ability to withstand Midwest windstorms as well. One barn was erected in 1907-08, 1910 or 1912 and the third c. 1912 or 1913, sources vary as to exact dates. The University of Illinois was then, and still is today, home to an Agricultural Experiment Station, these stations, located at universities throughout the United States were at the forefront of round barn promotion. The barns at the University of Illinois were instrumental in round barn era. In Illinois, at least one round barn was built with direct inspiration from the U of I round barns.

The first barn was built around 1907 or 1908 and was known as the Twenty Acre Dairy Barn; it was erected at a cost of US$3,200. The 1910 Dairy Horse Barn set the university back an additional $2,000 and the 1912 Dairy Experiment Barn was the most expensive at $11,000.

== Design ==
The barns were engineered by and designed by James M. White and Kell & Bernard. They were built every two years from 1908–1912 and as such, incorporated advances in construction and design to improve each subsequent round barn. White, the university architect, acted as supervising architect. Little is known about Kell & Bernard.

=== Twenty Acre Dairy Barn ===
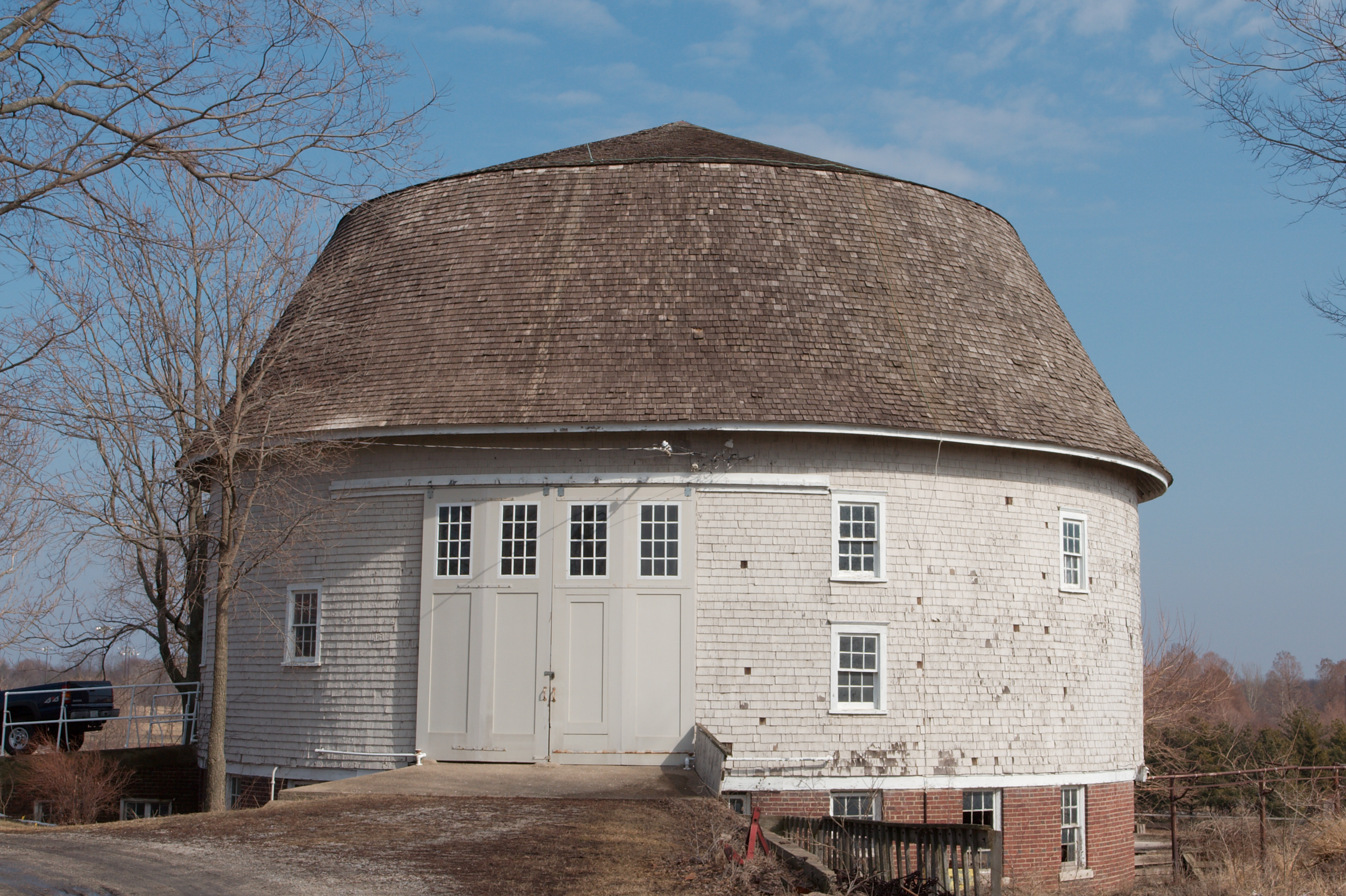
Barn 1

The 1908 Twenty Acre Dairy Barn, the earliest of the three round barns at U of I, is an example of a banked barn. Its east face is entirely exposed while the rest of the barn and its foundation rests within a hillside. The 60-foot (18 m) diameter barn's interior is dominated by a large central silo which extends from the basement to the apex of the roof.

=== Dairy Horse Barn ===
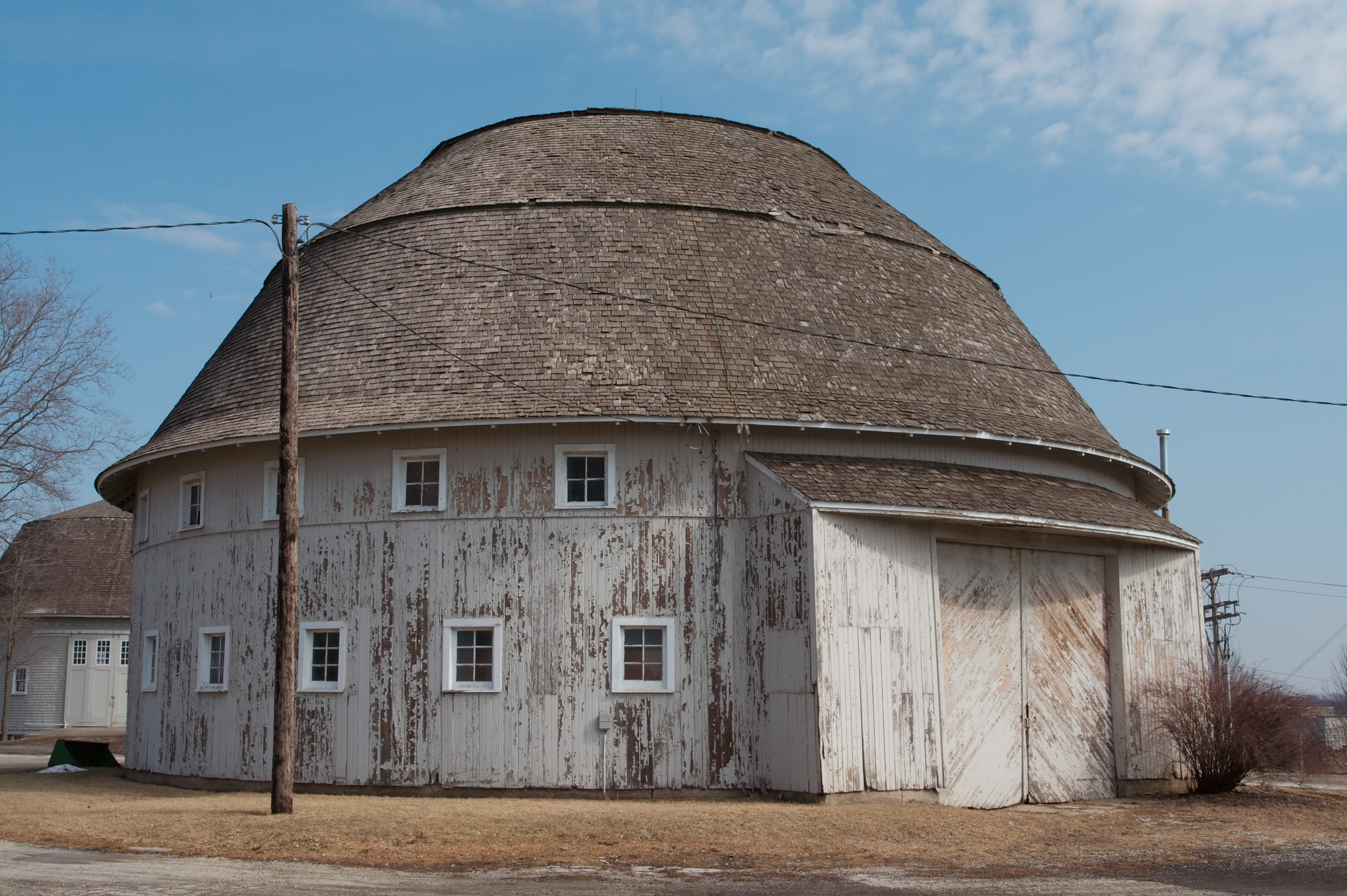
Barn 2

Through advances in construction technology the 1910 Dairy Horse Barn was constructed without the use of scaffolding. The interior of this 60-foot (18 m) diameter building is divided into two stories; the lower level has a concrete floor.

=== Dairy Experiment Barn ===
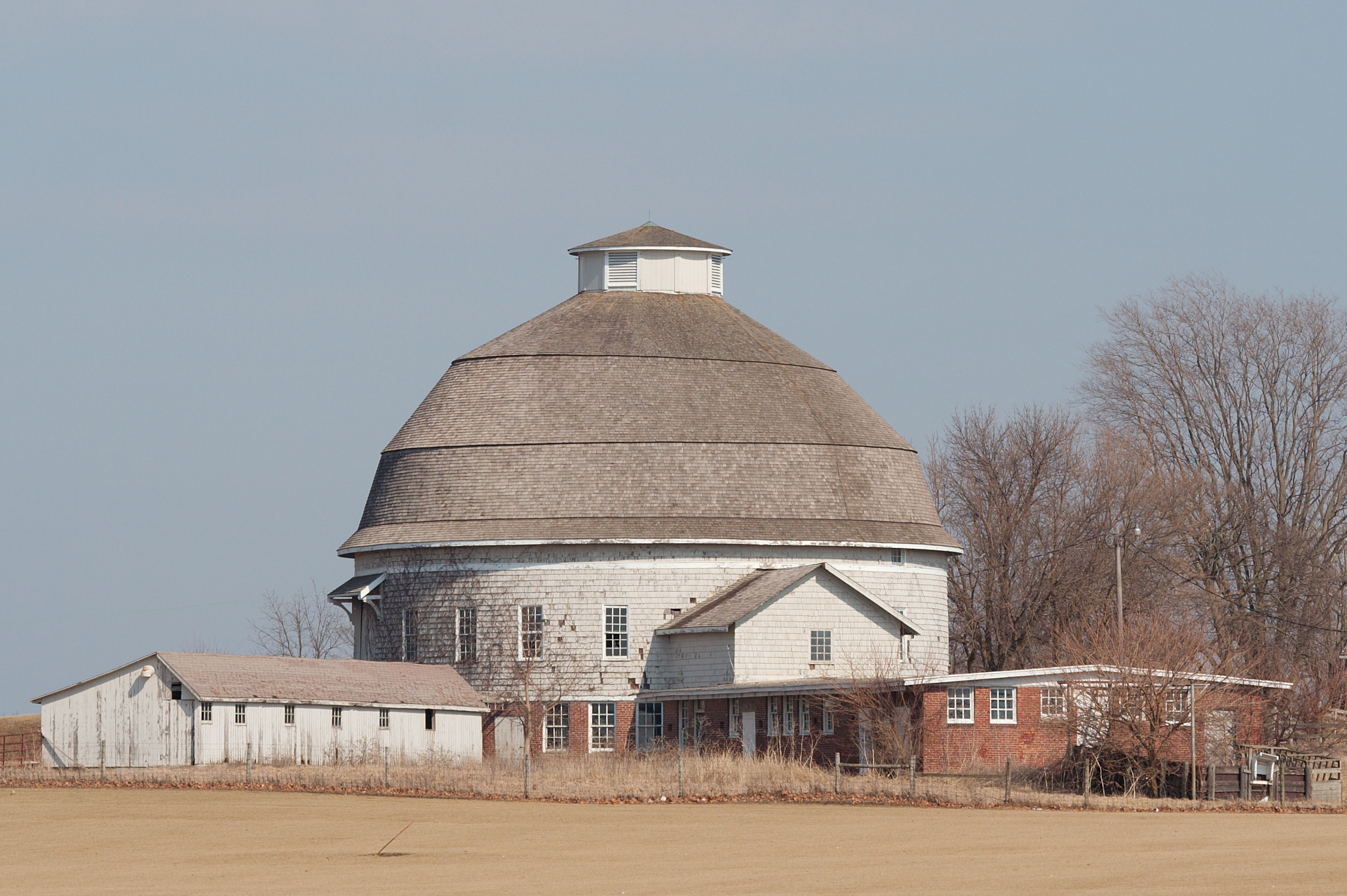
Cow shed, and Barn#3

The most expensive of the three barns, the 1912 Dairy Experiment Barn (Barn #3 on the map), is also the largest, at 70 feet (21 m) in diameter. Located on a hillside, it is the furthest barn from the Manager's House. The hillside around the building's south side was entirely excavated, thus it has its basement entirely exposed on that elevation. The north portion of the barn rests within the hillside giving the building a banked quality. This final round barn at U of I was built with a "wing" which allowed more cattle to be stored in the building.

== Significance ==
The Twenty Acre Dairy Barn, the Dairy Horse Barn, and the Dairy Experiment Barn were all listed as contributing properties within the University of Illinois Experimental Dairy Farm Historic District when it joined the National Register of Historic Places on February 4, 1994. The barns played a broader role in the history of American agriculture, specifically in the Midwest states. The barns at the University of Illinois were part of a larger move by Agricultural Experiment Stations meant to promote round barn design, mostly on account of their "efficiency." For a time, the round barn became a popular design across the Midwest, with hundreds being constructed in Illinois and Indiana alone. While the earliest round barns date to the 1820s, earlier if the round barn at Mount Vernon is included, the "round barn era" spanned the decades from 1880 to 1920.

In Illinois the round barns at the University of Illinois led to an increase in the style's popularity statewide. This was due, in part, to the access to audience that the U of I's Agricultural Experiment Station has through the publication of regular "Bulletins." The Agricultural Experiment Station Bulletin coupled with an article by H.C. Crouch touting round barns in the Illinois Agriculturalist led to the construction of round barns across the state. Anecdotal evidence of the impact of the University of Illinois round barns can be collected from farmers today. Stories about fathers and grandfathers recollect round barns being constructed on account of what was going on "over at the University."
