= Nulltown, Indiana =

- Unincorporated community
- Location within Indiana Location within the United States
- Coordinates: 39°34′47″N 85°09′30″W
- Country: United States
- State: Indiana
- County: Fayette
- Township: Columbia
- Elevation: 771 ft (235 m)
- ZIP code: 47331
- FIPS code: 18-55440
- GNIS feature ID: 440365

Nulltown is an unincorporated community in Columbia Township, Fayette County, Indiana.

== History ==
Nulltown was named for the Null brothers (Michael and Israel), who owned a sawmill at the town site. The first post office in Nulltown was opened in 1847.

Nulltown was a depot on the Whitewater Valley Railroad.

== Nulltown Wingnuts Flight Club ==
The Nulltown Wingnuts is a group of pilots who fly ultralight airplanes based out of Nulltown and fly throughout the region displaying their aircraft. The Wingnuts host a fly-in every September.
