= Columbia Township, Fayette County, Indiana =

Columbia Township
- Township
- Location of Columbia Township in Fayette County
- Coordinates: 39°33′36″N 85°12′13″W
- Country: United States
- State: Indiana
- County: Fayette

Government
  - Type: Indiana township

Area
  - Total: 21.42 sq mi (55.5 km^{2})
  - Land: 21.42 sq mi (55.5 km^{2})
  - Water: 0 sq mi (0 km^{2})
- Elevation: 833 ft (254 m)

Population (2020)
  - Total: 957
  - Density: 46.4/sq mi (17.9/km^{2})
- FIPS code: 18-14644
- GNIS feature ID: 453239

Columbia Township is one of nine townships in Fayette County, Indiana. As of the 2010 census, its population was 993 and it contained 423 housing units.

== History ==
Columbia Township was organized in 1819.

== Geography ==
According to the 2010 census, the township has a total area of 21.42 square miles (55.5 km^{2}), all land.

=== Unincorporated towns ===
- Alpine
- Columbia
- Nulltown

=== Adjacent townships ===
- Connersville Township (northeast)
- Jackson Township (east)
- Laurel Township, Franklin County (south)
- Posey Township, Franklin County (southwest)
- Orange Township (west)

=== Major highways ===
- Indiana State Road 121
