= Thomas Ranck Round Barn =

- U.S. National Register of Historic Places
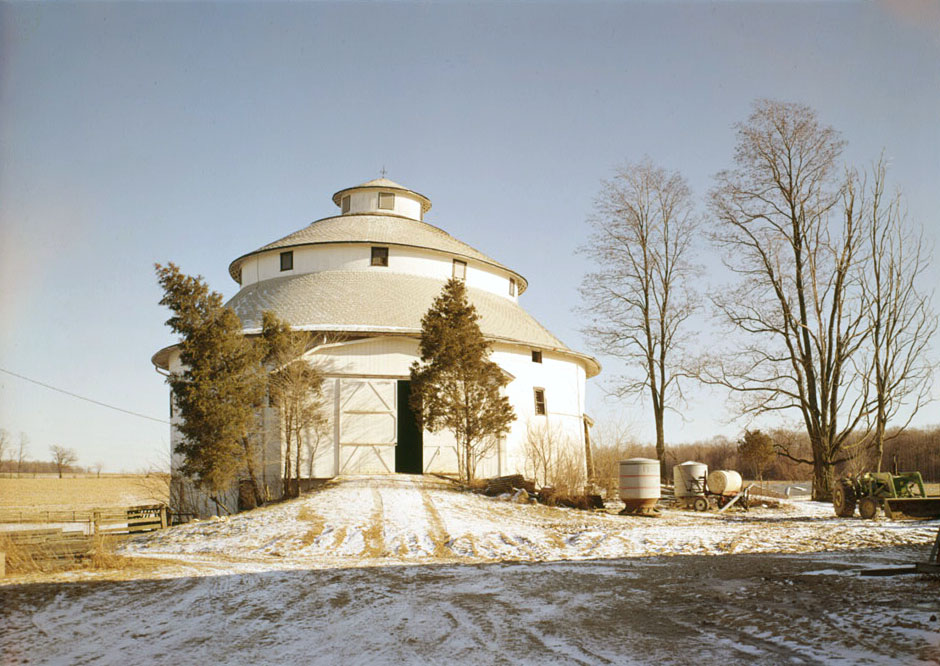
- Thomas Ranck Round Barn in Indiana.

- Location within Indiana Location within the United States
- Location: North of Brownsville on County Road 500N, Waterloo Township, Fayette County, Indiana
- Nearest city: Brownsville, Indiana
- Coordinates: 39°42′50″N 85°2′40″W
- Area: less than one acre
- Built: c.1885 – 1910
- Architect: possibly Isaac McNammee
- Architectural style: Round barn
- NRHP reference No.: 83000030
- Added to NRHP: January 11, 1983

The Thomas Ranck Round Barn is a round barn in Waterloo Township near the Fayette-Wayne County, Indiana county line. It is one of many round barns built in Indiana during the late 19th and early 20th centuries. Of the round barns built in eastern Indiana during this period the Ranck Round Barn stands out as one of the most elaborately designed structures. The Thomas Ranck Round Barn was listed on the U.S. National Register of Historic Places in January 1983.

Built in 1904, the Ranck Round Barn is a large and wood frame barn. It is part of a complex of buildings on the southeast portion of the McDivitt property in Brownsville, Indiana. Erected on a bank with a concrete foundation, the barn is 70 feet (21 m) in diameter, and is 70 feet (21 m) tall. The open structure consists of three circular tiers stacked on top of one another. The top section forms a cupola. Isaac McNammee constructed the Ranck Barn in 1904 for Thomas and Nancy Ranck. McNammee built several round barns in the area, and patented his design for a self-supporting conical roof in 1905. The Ranck farm was purchased in 1937 by a local veterinarian and his wife, Ralph and Tena Carmack. In 1945, Emmett and Mary McDivitt purchased the property.

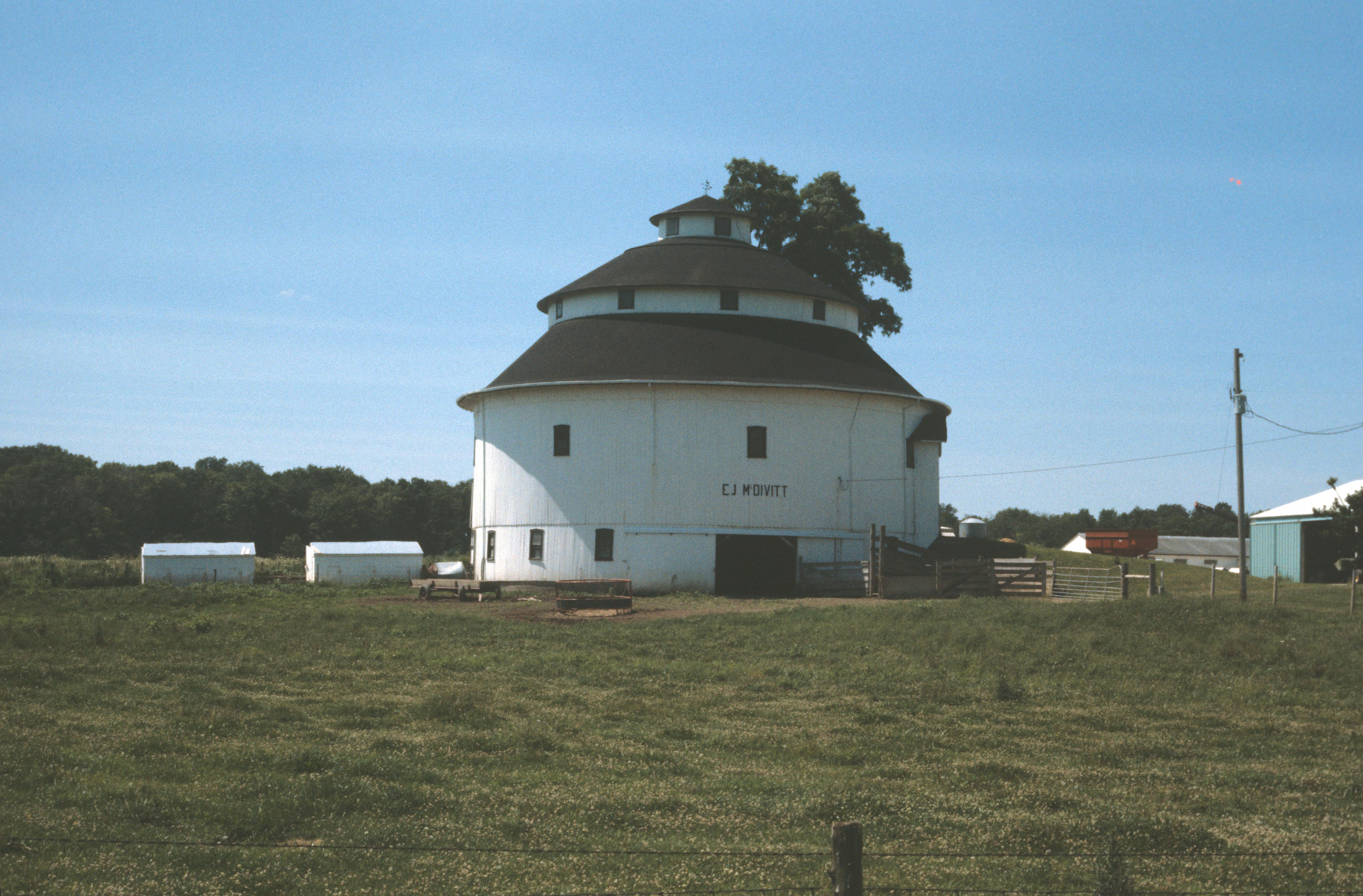

== Exterior ==
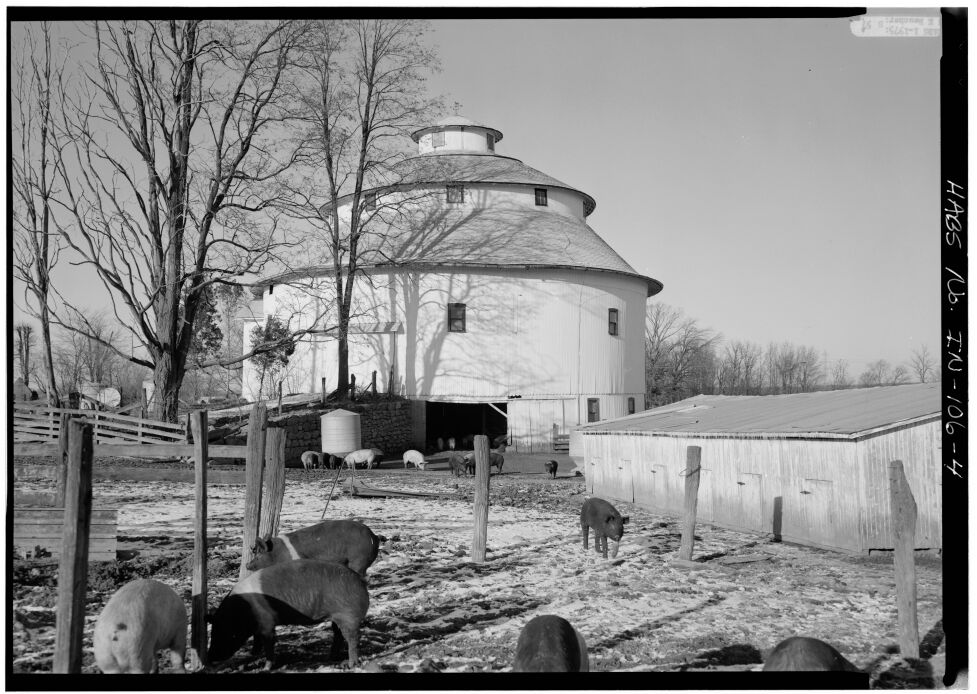
Thomas Ranck Round Barn, Indiana

This perfectly round structure has no central support system of timbers. With the exception of some timbers on the lower level, no structural member is more than 2.5 inches (6.4 cm) thick. The main floor is raised above the surrounding ground, and the lower level, is at grade. The exterior is covered with vertical wood siding, painted white.

The lower level is made of studs about 2'6" on center. Joists span in various directions to make a platform for the second level. At this level the main drum has studs with rhythmically spaced angle bracing reaching to the upper first roof plate. These braces are paired and spaced and have intermediate stiffening diagonals. Each upper drum rests on a laminated sill/plate, which apparently acts as a tension ring.

An earthen ramp slopes up to the main entrance for the upper level on the west side. The doorway is in a projecting bay with a low gambrel roof. It has two sliding wooden doors consisting of three horizontal panels, with diagonally bracing in the top and bottom panels. At grade access is provided on the north side. Another pair of wooden doors once hung from the shed roof overhang, which has been removed. The barn roof is a series of truncated cones. The cupola has a conical cap. The roof is covered in gray asphalt shingles. The overhanging eaves have exposed rafters and fascia. Small windows provide light and ventilation on the main and lower floor. At the loft level, there are small, square, fixed windows around the building. In the cupola, square, louvered vents]] have replaced the windows, which were the same shape as those at the loft level.

== Interior ==
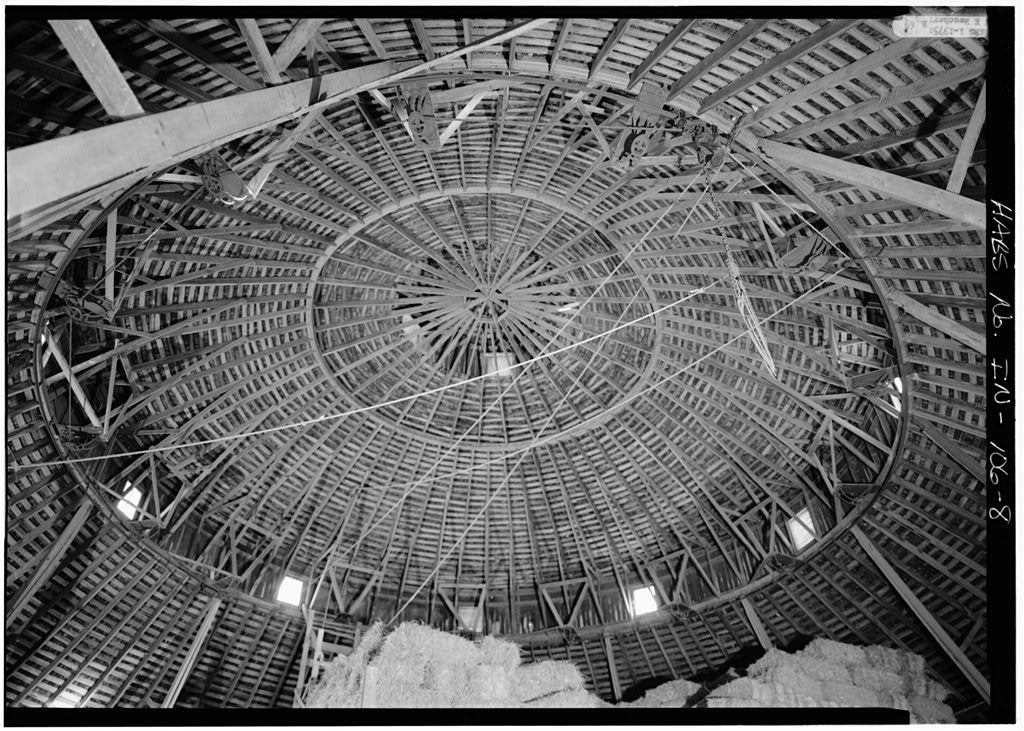
Roof trusses in the Thomas Ranck Round Barn, Indiana

The lower level has a concrete floor with access from the north. Stock pens are arranged around the perimeter. A central circular walkway allows access to all of the stalls. An interior stairway leads to the main level.

The main level has an earth floor. Divided by wood partitions, the floor serves as a storage area for equipment and supplies. On this level is a one-story wooden corncrib. Two grain bins, 10 by 15 feet (3.0 by 4.6 m) are located in the center. The interior is open to the roof of the cupola. A hayloft extends overs about 1/3 of the main floor. It is supported by paired brackets and diagonal beams placed between the brackets in each pair.

== Significance ==
The Ranck, or McDiyitt, Round Barn is significant as one of the best-preserved of Indiana's round barns. This local landmark is essentially unaltered, and has been well maintained over the years. The barn has no system of central support for its three-tier roof, and few structural members more than. 2 ½ inches thick. Its remarkable construction makes it an outstanding example of stick carpentry engineering.

== Design ==
The Ranck Round Barn is 70 feet in diameter at its base and stands 70 feet tall. The barn features two rows of clerestories set between round lantern conical roofs which decrease in size with height. The building's west entrance has a pavilion with a gambrel roof.

== See also ==
- National Register of Historic Places listings in Fayette County, Indiana

== Bibliography ==
- Karp, Mort. Report prepared for Historic American Buildings Survey; Richmond Indiana Field Office, August 8, 1974.
- Klamkin, Charles. Barns: Their History, Preservation, and Restoration; New York; Hawthorne Books, 1973.
- Radford, William; Loveless, David, and Loveless, Joan. Practical Plans for Barns, Carriage Houses, Stables, and Other Country Buildings; Stockbridge, Massachusetts: Berkshire Traveller Press, 1978.
- Whitaker, James. Agricultural Buildings and Structures; Reston, Va.; Prentice-Hall, 1979,
