= Waterloo, Fayette County, Indiana =

Waterloo, Indiana
- Unincorporated community
- Location within Indiana Location within the United States
- Coordinates: 39°42′13″N 85°06′11″W
- Country: United States
- State: Indiana
- County: Fayette
- Township: Waterloo
- Elevation: 869 ft (265 m)
- ZIP code: 47331
- FIPS code: 18-81296
- GNIS feature ID: 445541

Waterloo is an unincorporated community in Waterloo Township, Fayette County, Indiana, United States.

== History ==
Waterloo was platted in 1841. It took its name from Waterloo Township.

On May 14, 1883, a tornado struck the town, destroying all but three buildings, injuring one, and leaving 75 people homeless. On April 25, 1961, an F4 tornado hit the town, destroying multiple homes and buildings, but causing no casualties in the town.
