= Jennings Township, Fayette County, Indiana =

Jennings Township
- Township
- Location of Jennings Township in Fayette County
- Coordinates: 39°36′28″N 85°03′50″W
- Country: United States
- State: Indiana
- County: Fayette

Government
  - Type: Indiana township

Area
  - Total: 18.17 sq mi (47.1 km^{2})
  - Land: 18.17 sq mi (47.1 km^{2})
  - Water: 0 sq mi (0 km^{2})
- Elevation: 938 ft (286 m)

Population (2020)
  - Total: 808
  - Density: 45.7/sq mi (17.6/km^{2})
- FIPS code: 18-38412
- GNIS feature ID: 453507

Jennings Township is one of nine townships in Fayette County, Indiana. As of the 2010 census, its population was 830 and it contained 360 housing units.

== History ==
Jennings Township was established in 1819. It was named for Jonathan Jennings, who was acting governor at the time of the township's organization.

== Geography ==
According to the 2010 census, the township has a total area of 18.17 square miles (47.1 km^{2}), all land.

=== Unincorporated towns ===
- Alquina
- Lyonsville

=== Adjacent townships ===
- Waterloo Township (north)
- Brownsville Township, Union County (northeast)
- Liberty Township, Union County (east)
- Harmony Township, Union County (southeast)
- Jackson Township (southwest)
- Connersville Township (west)

=== Major highways ===
- Indiana State Road 1
- Indiana State Road 44

=== Cemeteries ===
The township contains three cemeteries: Mount Garrison, Simpson and Union. There is also at least one other small cemetery along Village Creek, the Burk Cemetery.
