= Connersville Township, Fayette County, Indiana =

Connersville Township
- Township
- Location of Connersville Township in Fayette County
- Coordinates: 39°37′50″N 85°10′11″W
- Country: United States
- State: Indiana
- County: Fayette

Government
  - Type: Indiana township

Area
  - Total: 32.77 sq mi (84.9 km^{2})
  - Land: 32.71 sq mi (84.7 km^{2})
  - Water: 0.06 sq mi (0.16 km^{2})
- Elevation: 869 ft (265 m)

Population (2020)
  - Total: 11,955
  - Density: 375.5/sq mi (145.0/km^{2})
- ZIP code: 47331
- Area code: 765
- FIPS code: 18-14950
- GNIS feature ID: 453246

Connersville Township is one of nine townships in Fayette County, Indiana. As of the 2010 census, its population was 12,282 and it contained 5,573 housing units.

== History ==
Connersville Township was organized in 1819 as one of five original townships of Fayette County containing the namesake town, which was designated the county seat.

John Conner is credited with being the first settler in Connersville Township. He established a trading post which was the center of early pioneer life.

== Geography ==
According to the 2010 census, the township has a total area of 32.77 square miles (84.9 km^{2}), of which 32.71 square miles (84.7 km^{2}) (or 99.82%) is land and 0.06 square miles (0.16 km^{2}) (or 0.18%) is water.

=== Cities and towns ===
- Connersville (southwest half)

=== Unincorporated towns ===
- Tyner Crossing

(This list is based on USGS data and may include former settlements.)

=== Adjacent townships ===
- Harrison Township (north)
- Waterloo Township (northeast)
- Jennings Township (east)
- Jackson Township (southeast)
- Columbia Township (southwest)
- Orange Township (southwest)
- Fairview Township (northwest)

=== Major highways ===
- Indiana State Road 1
- Indiana State Road 44
- Indiana State Road 121

=== Cemeteries ===
The township contains one cemetery, Tullis Chapel.
