= Springersville, Indiana =

- Unincorporated community
- Location within Indiana Location within the United States
- Coordinates: 39°39′26″N 85°03′14″W
- Country: United States
- State: Indiana
- County: Fayette
- Township: Waterloo
- Elevation: 906 ft (276 m)
- ZIP code: 47331
- FIPS code: 18-72098
- GNIS feature ID: 444008

Springersville is an unincorporated community in Waterloo Township, Fayette County, Indiana.

== History ==
Springersville was laid out in 1840. A post office was established at Springersville in 1840, and remained in operation until it was discontinued in 1853.
