= Jackson Township, Fayette County, Indiana =

Jackson Township
- Township
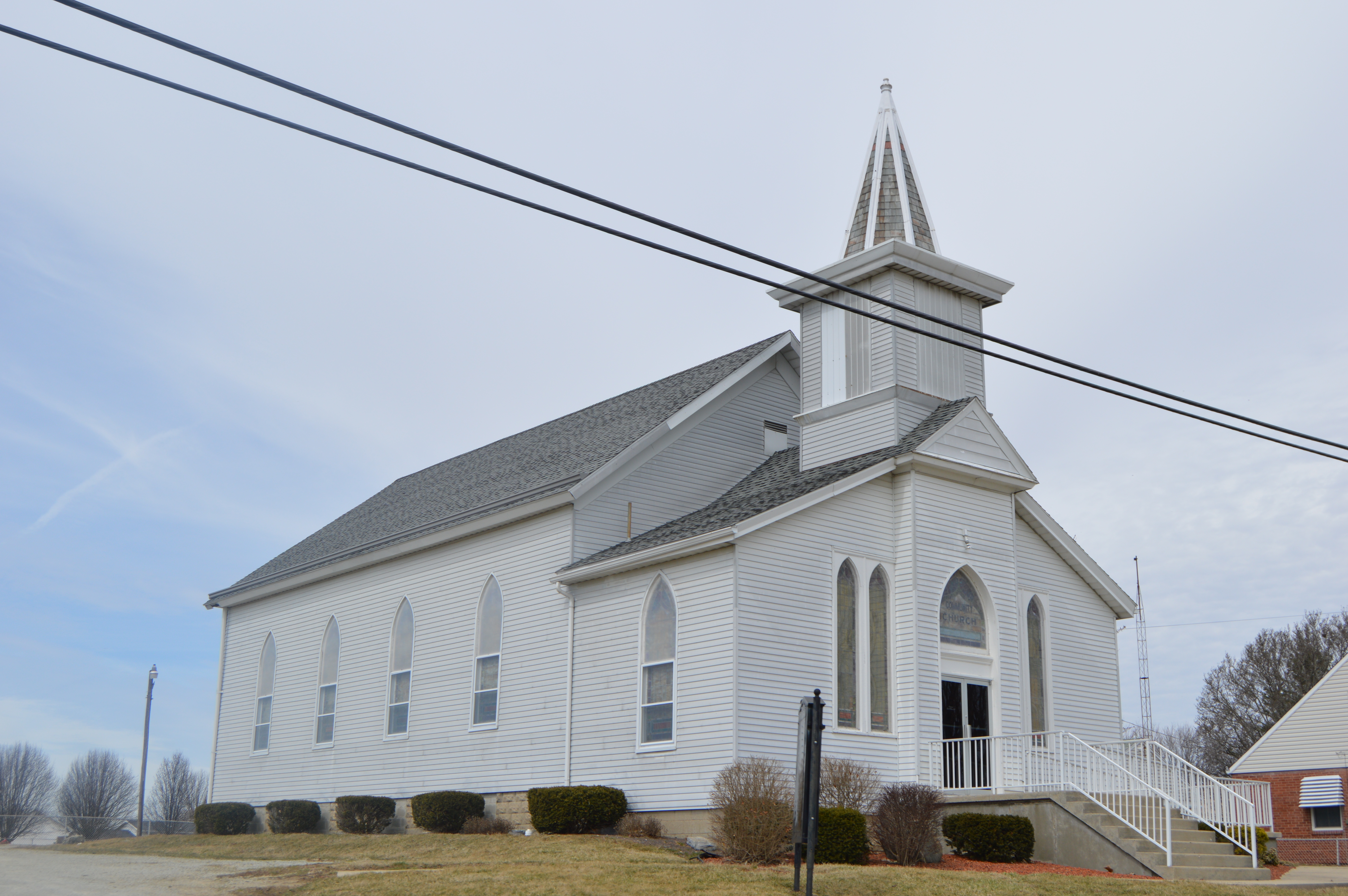
- Church in Everton

- Location of Jackson Township in Fayette County
- Coordinates: 39°33′29″N 85°06′27″W
- Country: United States
- State: Indiana
- County: Fayette

Government
  - Type: Indiana township

Area
  - Total: 27.39 sq mi (70.9 km^{2})
  - Land: 27.39 sq mi (70.9 km^{2})
  - Water: 0 sq mi (0 km^{2})
- Elevation: 994 ft (303 m)

Population (2020)
  - Total: 1,464
  - Density: 55.6/sq mi (21.5/km^{2})
- FIPS code: 18-36990
- GNIS feature ID: 453443

Jackson Township is one of nine townships in Fayette County, Indiana. As of the 2010 census, its population was 1,524 and it contained 615 housing units.

== History ==
Jackson Township was established in 1820 from a land given by Columbia Township. It was named for General and afterward President Andrew Jackson.

== Geography ==
According to the 2010 census, the township had a total area of 27.39 square miles (70.9 km^{2}), all land.

=== Unincorporated towns ===
- Everton

=== Adjacent townships ===
- Jennings Township (northeast)
- Harmony Township, Union County (east)
- Blooming Grove Township, Franklin County (southeast)
- Laurel Township, Franklin County (southwest)
- Columbia Township (west)
- Connersville Township (northwest)

=== Major highways ===
- Indiana State Road 1

=== Cemeteries ===
The township contains the following cemeteries: Maize Elliott Farm Cemetery, Everton Cemetery, Green Family Cemetery, Ireland Church Cemetery, Sarah and John Lee Farm Cemetery, Mt. Zion Cemetery, Myers-Brumfiel Cemetery, Old Parrot or Marvin Rose Cemetery, Poplar Ridge Cemetery, Union or Old Smallwood Cemetery
