= Alpine, Indiana =

- Unincorporated community
- Location within Indiana Location within the United States
- Coordinates: 39°33′14″N 85°10′33″W
- Country: United States
- State: Indiana
- County: Fayette
- Township: Columbia
- Elevation: 758 ft (231 m)
- ZIP code: 47331
- FIPS code: 18-01180
- GNIS feature ID: 430115

Alpine is an unincorporated community in Columbia Township, Fayette County, Indiana.

== History ==
The first sawmill in Columbia Township was built at Alpine in 1814. Alpine was laid out as a town in about 1832.

By 1885, Alpine contained a sawmill, a gristmill, and a station on the Whitewater Valley Railroad.

A post office opened in Alpine in 1868, and remained in operation until it was discontinued in 1966.

== Geography ==
Alpine is located on State Route 121 about 6 miles (9.7 km) south of Connersville.
