= University of Illinois Experimental Dairy Farm Historic District =

Historic district in Illinois, United States

- U.S. National Register of Historic Places
- U.S. Historic district
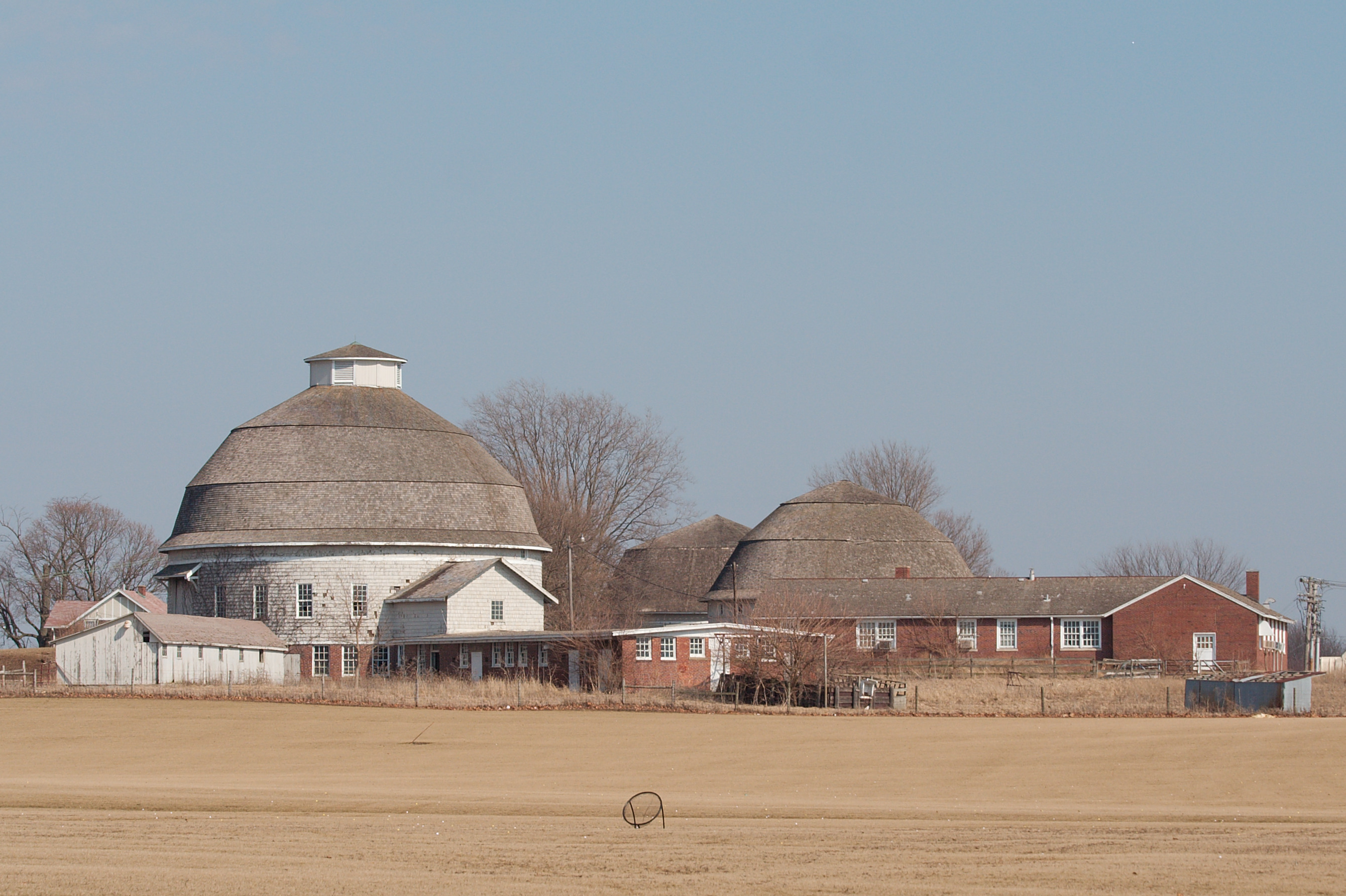
- A view of the University of Illinois Experimental Dairy Farm Historic District

- Location within Illinois Location within the United States
- Location: 1201 W. St. Mary's Rd., Urbana, Illinois
- Coordinates: 40°5′38″N 88°13′27″W
- Area: 6 acres (2 ha)
- Built: Various
- Architect: Kell & Bernard, James M. White
- Architectural style: Round barns, Tudor Revival, American Craftsman
- MPS: MPL001 – Round Barns in Illinois Thematic Resources
- NRHP reference No.: 94000030
- Added to NRHP: February 4, 1994

The University of Illinois Experimental Dairy Farm Historic District, also known as South Farm, is a designated historic district in the U.S. state of Illinois. It is located on the campus of the University of Illinois in Urbana, Illinois. The district consists of eight contributing structures and several non-contributing structures. The district was designated in 1994 when it was added to the National Register of Historic Places as part of the Multiple Property Submission concerning Round Barns in Illinois. Three of the district's buildings are early 20th century round barns constructed between 1908 and 1912. The district covers a total area of 6 acres (2 ha).

== History ==
The Agricultural Experiment Station at the University of Illinois (U of I) was formed in 1888, one year after the Hatch Act provided federal funds. After its initial establishment U of I's College of Agriculture began to grow and it was divided into three distinct components: classroom instruction at U of I, the Agricultural Experiment Station, and a statewide extension service. In 1899 Eugene Davenport replaced George E. Morrow as Dean of the College of Agriculture, and Davenport immediately reorganized the college into four departments: agronomy, animal husbandry, dairy husbandry, and horticulture. The Experiment Station was originally established to "administer research activities within the College." The Department of Dairy Husbandry, seeking to increase milk productivity by promoting efficiency, prompted the Experiment Station to construct the Experimental Dairy Farm at an area known as South Farms. The layout and design incorporated three round barns. Experimental Dairy Farms, in general, were receiving broad support as a way to combat problems within dairy farming.

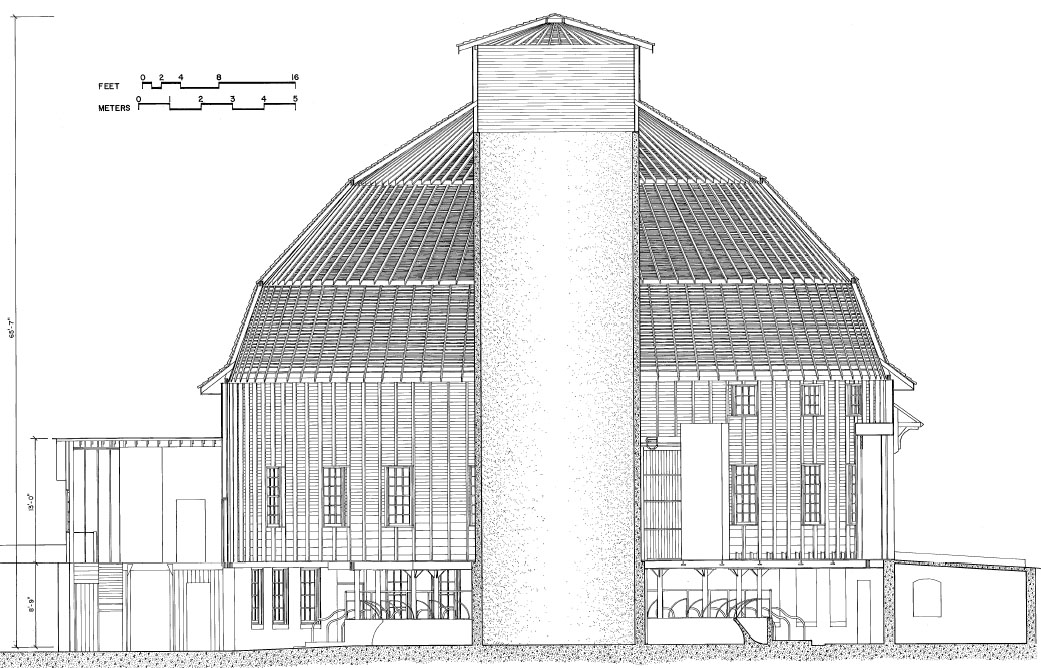
A scale drawing of one of the historic district's round barns.

The three round barns in the historic district were the inspiration of Wilbur J. Fraser. Fraser was the first head of the Department of Dairy Husbandry from 1902 - 1913. He was also a strong advocate of the round barn which he said offered the "economy of consideration, low maintenance, and labor efficiency." Fraser asserted that round barns had a better ability to withstand Midwest windstorms as well. Fraser became the first Chief of Dairy Husbandry at the Agricultural Experiment Station in 1908. His colleague, H.C. Crouch, left New England at the same time to accept the position of manager at the U of I Experimental Dairy Farm. Fraser spent the summer of 1908 in Europe, visiting the Great Britain, the Netherlands and Denmark. While there, he took opportunity to learn techniques from local farmers which inspired his push for "efficiency" upon his return to the States. Fraser and Crouch led the promotion of round barn design in Illinois because they believed the very design of the round barn promoted the scientific principles of agriculture as well as a common sense approach to dairy farming.

One barn was erected in 1907-08, a second in 1910 or 1912, and the third c. 1912 or 1913, sources vary as to exact dates. The University of Illinois was then, and still is today, home to an Agricultural Experiment Station, these stations, located at universities throughout the United States were at the forefront of round barn promotion. The barns at the University of Illinois were instrumental in round barn era. In Illinois, at least one round barn was built with direct inspiration from the U of I round barns.

The facilities at the University of Illinois Experimental Dairy Farm were replaced by larger confines in 1960, though the area was maintained. When the district was nominated for inclusion on the National Register in 1994 the round barns at the site were still being used for small herd dairy experiments and housed cattle.

== Boundaries ==
The area that encompasses the district is set upon a ridge top and has been popularly known as South Farms. On the north the area is bordered by St. Mary's Road, a fence to the south and west and a treeline on the east side. The area to the north of the district buildings is pasture dotted with a few a university buildings. Open land is found to the east of the district. A variety of plant life surrounds the site as well. The district area is known as South Farms because of its historic location to the south of the main University of Illinois campus along a ridgeline in southern Urbana, Illinois.

== Architecture ==
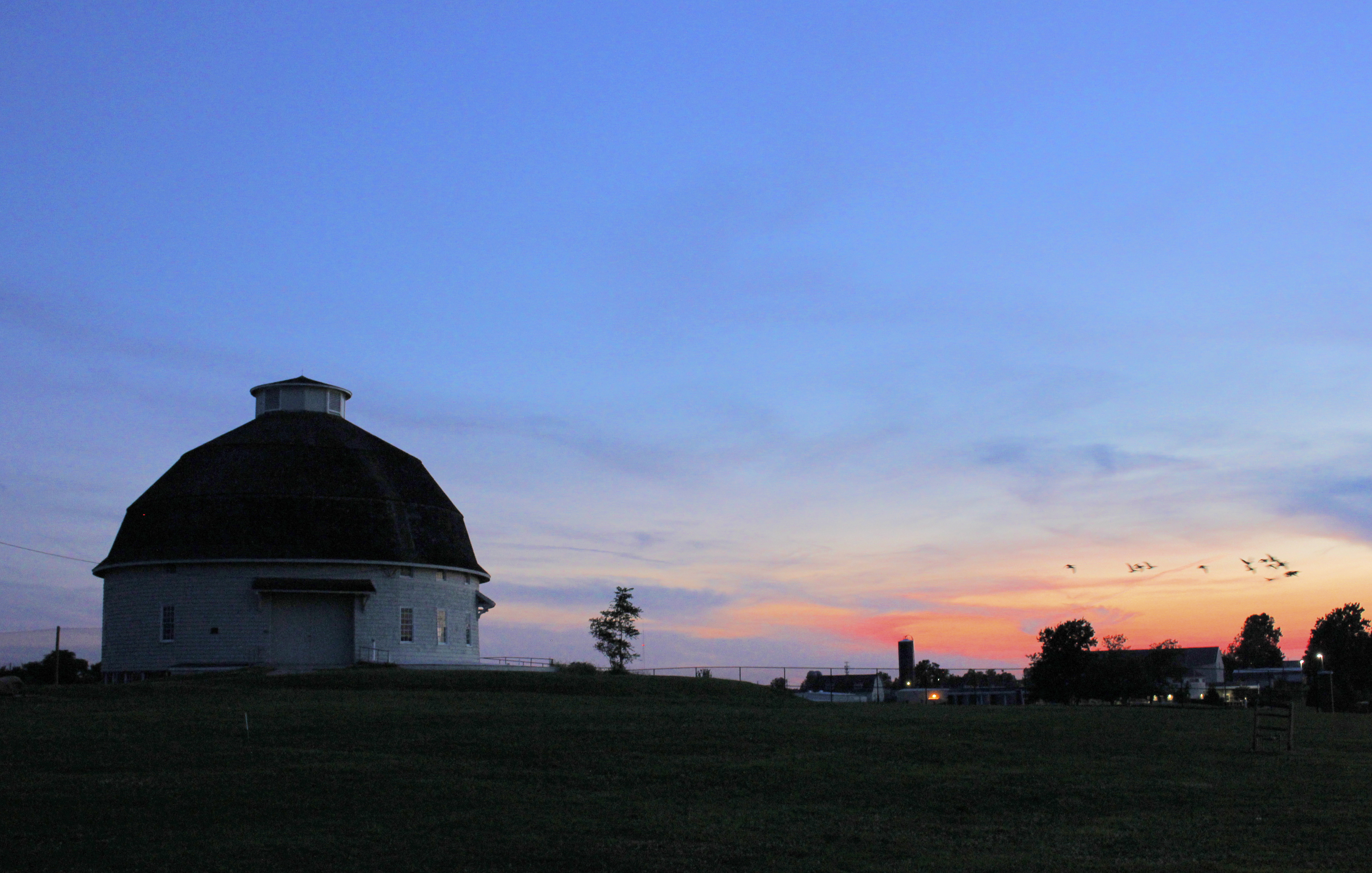
the round barns at sunset

Many of the smaller outbuildings included in the historic district have no particular architectural style. The main structures in the district, the three round barns and the Manager's House, however, all have distinct architectural design elements from classifications within their unique structure types. The Manager's House combines elements from Tudor Revival and American Craftsman architecture. While the barns are not of a style, per se, they do represent a design movement within American agriculture. The movement that popularized round barns was in part, due to the promotion of the design by the university and its round barns.

== Structures ==
While the property information report from the state of Illinois asserts that there are eight contributing structures, the actual original nomination form lists eight total structures with only five contributing: a storage building, the three round barns, and the Manager's House. Three other structures detailed on the nomination are listed as non-contributing: the "Cow Shed," the Dairy Laboratory, and the 1950s era garage for the Manager's House.

Over time, the historic district has lost three structures. One, a silo southwest of Barn #3, was extant as late as 1950. A second was a small, gable-roofed structure which resembled a shed or similar outbuilding. That structure was east of Barn #3. The final lost building was between Barns #2 and #3, along an east-west orientation. Historic photographs show the building was a small, residential structure with human-scaled doorways, which may have been a laboratory of some sort.

=== Manager's House ===
This 1908 residential building combines elements from Tudor Revival and American Craftsman architectural styles. The square plan, two-story structure has a full basement and a brick and stucco foundation.

=== Round Barns ===
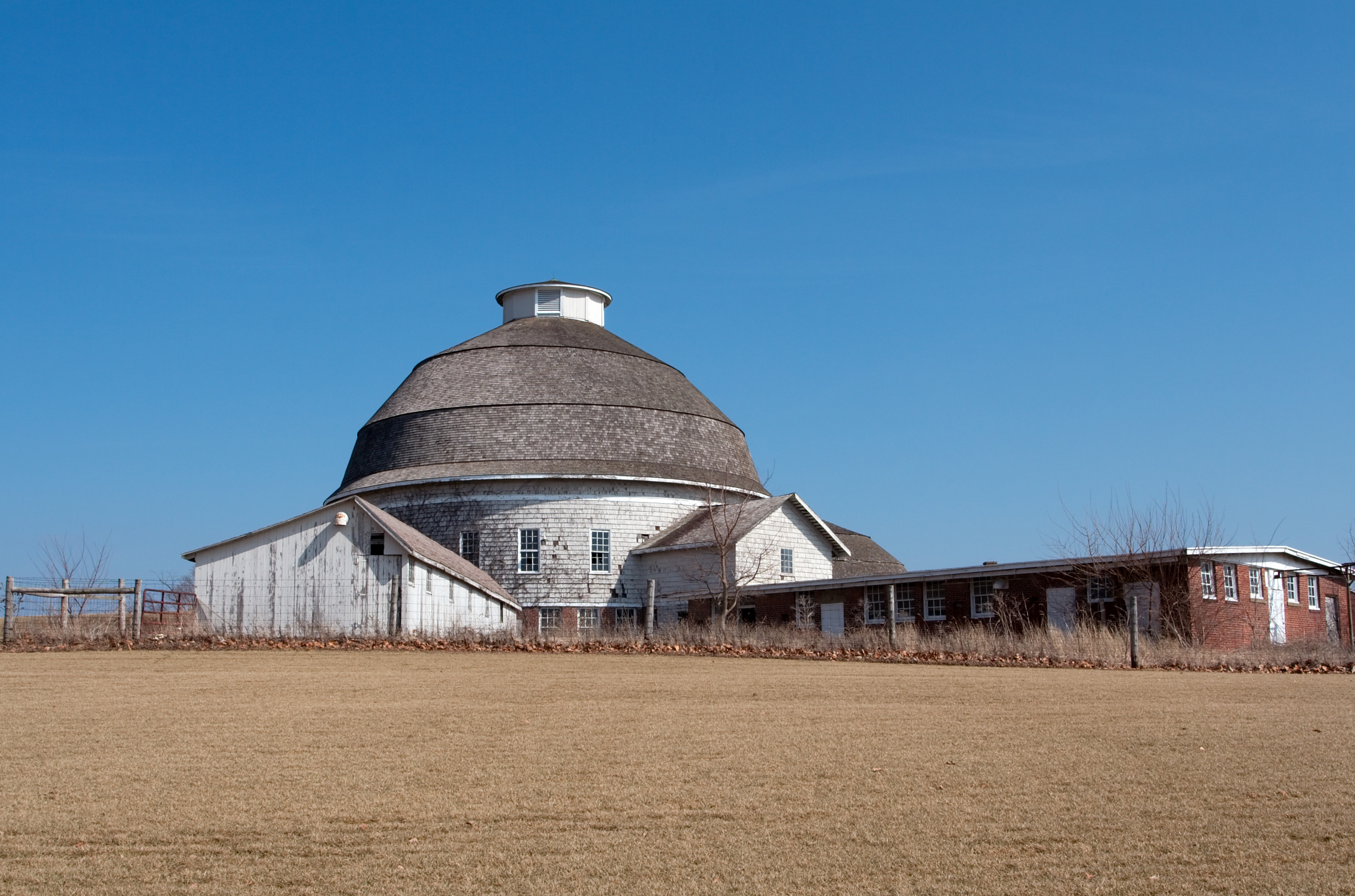
Contributing property round barn#3 and non-contributing white cow shed.

The round barns at the University of Illinois played a special role in the promotion and popularity of the American round barn. The University of Illinois was home to one of the Agricultural Experiment Stations at U.S. universities which were at the heart of the promotion of the round barn. At least one round barn in Illinois was built specifically after its owner viewed the barns at the university. Though originally an experiment the three barns helped to lead the way for round barn construction throughout the Midwest, particularly in Illinois.

=== Storage building ===
The pre-1934 Storage building is a rectangular, one story structure on a concrete foundation. It has a gabled roof and wood siding, when the district was nominated in 1994 the storage building's gabled roof had asbestos shingles. The interior of the building is open, its walls and ceilings are plywood and it has a concrete floor.

=== Non-contributing ===
Of the eight structures on site as of 2007, three are non-contributing to the historical integrity of the small historic district. Two are one-story rectangular buildings: the 1951 Garage and the post-1950 Cow Shed. The third is the 1956 Dairy Laboratory, a one-story "L" plan building.

== Significance ==
The University of Illinois Experimental Dairy Farm was established as a National Register of Historic Places historic district on February 4, 1994. The nomination form to the National Register of Historic Places was dated December 22, 1993 and completed by the Illinois Historic Preservation Agency (IHPA). The IHPA noted the district's significance under the National Register inclusion criteria for architecture and "significant people." The round barns were built to promote the scientific pursuit of dairy farming; they had an impact, in some cases prompting farmers to construct their own round barns.

== See also ==
- National Register of Historic Places listings in Champaign County, Illinois
