= Columbia, Fayette County, Indiana =

Columbia, Indiana
- Unincorporated community
- Location within Indiana Location within the United States
- Coordinates: 39°34′35″N 85°12′26″W
- Country: United States
- State: Indiana
- County: Fayette
- Township: Columbia
- Elevation: 994 ft (303 m)
- ZIP code: 47331
- FIPS code: 18-14626
- GNIS feature ID: 432813

Columbia is an unincorporated community in Columbia Township, Fayette County, Indiana.

== History ==
Columbia was laid out in 1832. It took its name from Columbia Township. A post office was established at Columbia in 1833, and remained in operation until it was discontinued in 1903.

== Geography ==
There are only three roads in the entire Columbia area: South County Road, West Columbia Road and West Monroe Street.
