= Alquina, Indiana =

- Unincorporated community
- Location within Indiana Location within the United States
- Coordinates: 39°36′46″N 85°03′17″W
- Country: United States
- State: Indiana
- County: Fayette
- Township: Jennings
- Elevation: 1,034 ft (315 m)
- ZIP code: 47331
- FIPS code: 18-01198
- GNIS feature ID: 430116

Alquina was an unincorporated community in Jennings Township, Fayette County, Indiana.

== History ==
Alquina was founded in 1813 by Joseph Vanmeter. One source speculates it was named after Alquines, in France.

A post office was established at Alquina in 1832, and remained in operation until it was discontinued in 1903.

== Geography ==
Alquina was located on East Alquina Road about 5 miles (8.0 km) east of the center of Connersville. Alquina was the home of the Alquina Blue Arrows High School. The high school was closed in 1966 and the elementary school continued until 2010.
