= Everton, Indiana =

- Unincorporated community and Census-designated place
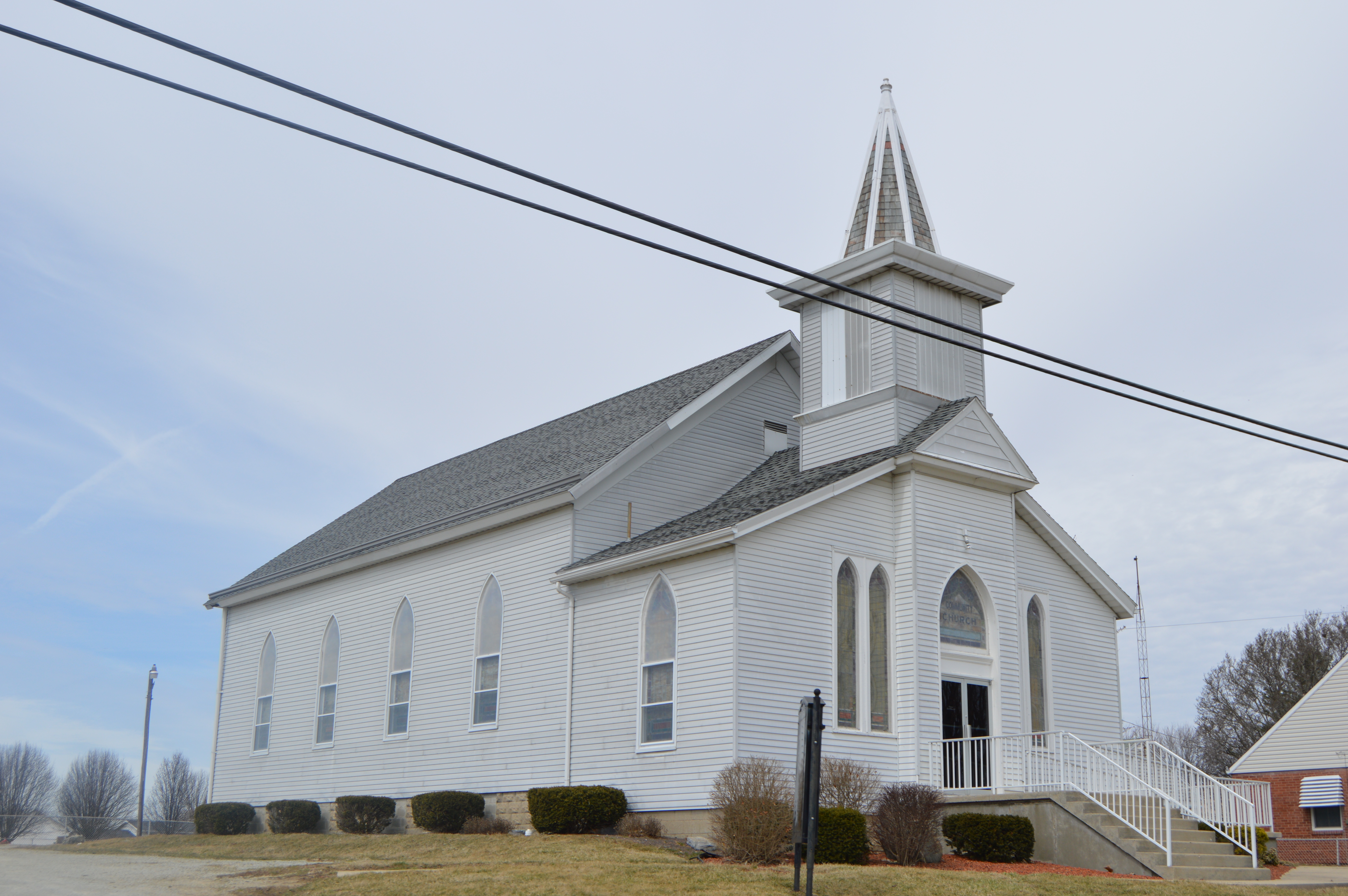
- Everton Community Church

- Location within Indiana Location within the United States
- Coordinates: 39°33′05″N 85°06′14″W
- Country: United States
- State: Indiana
- County: Fayette
- Township: Jackson
- Elevation: 978 ft (298 m)
- ZIP code: 47331
- FIPS code: 18-22072
- GNIS feature ID: 2830369

Everton is an unincorporated community in Jackson Township, Fayette County, Indiana.

== History ==
Everton was laid out as a town prior to 1836, but because the records have been lost, it is not known exactly when. The origin of the name is likewise lost to history.

A post office was established at Everton in 1827, and remained in operation until it was discontinued in 1937.

== Demographics ==
The United States Census Bureau first delineated Everton as a census designated place in the 2022 American Community Survey.
