= Lyonsville, Indiana =

- Unincorporated community
- Location within Indiana Location within the United States
- Coordinates: 39°39′09″N 85°03′14″W
- Country: United States
- State: Indiana
- County: Fayette
- Township: Jennings
- Elevation: 876 ft (267 m)
- ZIP code: 47331
- FIPS code: 18-45522
- GNIS feature ID: 438443

Lyonsville is an unincorporated community in Jennings Township, Fayette County, Indiana.

== History ==
Lyonsville was originally called Lyons Station. It was renamed Lyonsville in 1916, in order to avoid confusion with Lyons in Greene County.

Abraham Lyons was a pioneer settler in Jennings Township.
