= Pete French Round Barn =

- U.S. National Register of Historic Places
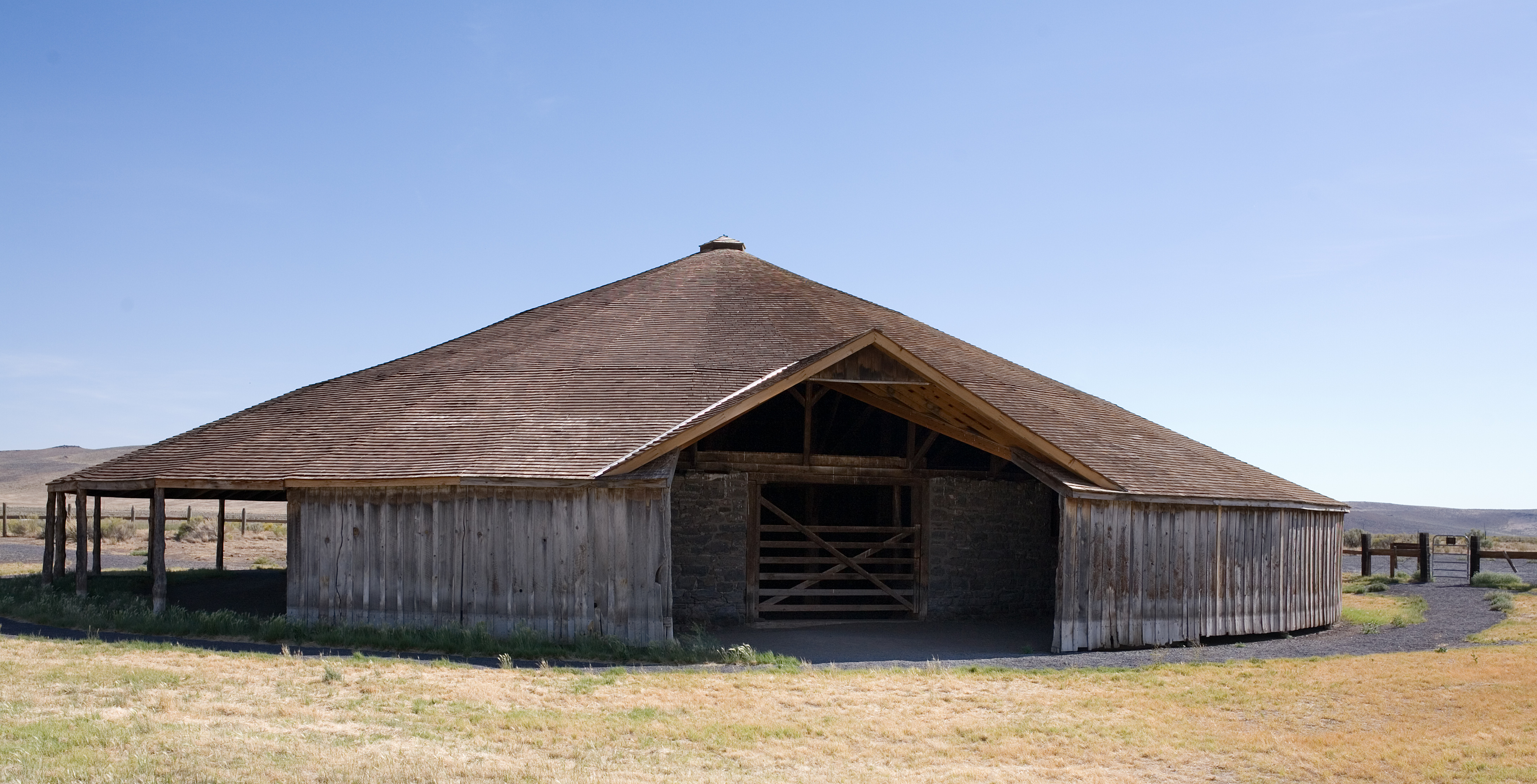
- Barn in 2013
- Location: Harney County, Oregon
- Nearest city: Burns
- Coordinates: 43°07′57″N 118°38′33″W
- Area: 5 acres (2.0 ha)
- Built: c. 1875-1885
- Architectural style: Round barn
- NRHP reference No.: 71000679
- Added to NRHP: September 10, 1971

The Pete French Round Barn, located near Burns, Oregon, United States, is a round barn listed on the National Register of Historic Places. The late 19th century barn was owned and constructed by cattle rancher Peter French; French trained horses there during the winter. The barn was listed on the National Register on September 10, 1971.

== History ==
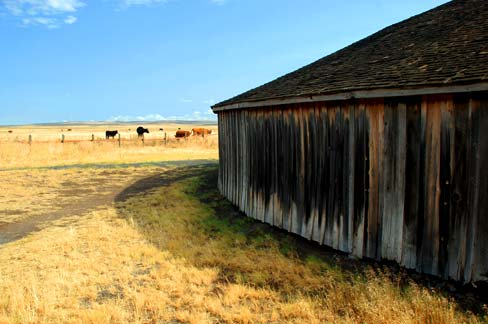

This round barn was constructed sometime in the late 1870s or early 1880s. There were originally two—or possibly three—in the vicinity, but this is the only round barn remaining. They were used to break horses during the winter. Three hundred to one thousand horses were moved through each year. The Jenkins family donated the site to the state of Oregon in 1969.

== Design ==
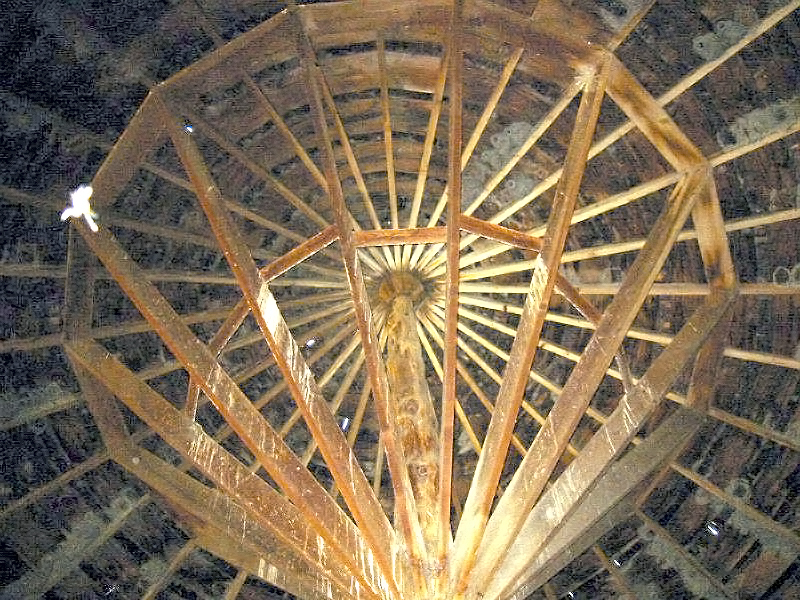
Interior ceiling of Pete French Round Barn shows the large single juniper center post and dimensional wood lumber support structure

The interior of the barn consists of a circular rock wall, constructed with local rock and mud, which encloses the central stable area. The remainder of the structure is constructed from lumber that was hauled to the site from 60 miles (97 km) to the north. The interior is unique in that it is supported by juniper posts. The center area was used as a horse stable; around the outside of the rock wall, there is a covered circular track that was used to exercise horses during winter months. The barn looks much as it did when cattleman Pete French constructed it.
