= Harrisburg, Indiana =

- Unincorporated community
- Location within Indiana Location within the United States
- Coordinates: 39°41′12″N 85°10′48″W
- Country: United States
- State: Indiana
- County: Fayette
- Township: Harrison
- Elevation: 1,004 ft (306 m)
- Time zone: UTC-5 (Eastern)
  - Summer (DST): UTC-4 (EDT)
- ZIP code: 47434
- FIPS code: 18-31576
- GNIS feature ID: 449668

Harrisburg is an unincorporated community in Harrison Township, Fayette County, Indiana.

== History ==
A post office was established at Harrisburg (then spelled Harrisburgh) in 1828, and remained in operation until it was discontinued in 1902.
