= Harrison Township, Fayette County, Indiana =

Harrison Township
- Township
- Location of Harrison Township in Fayette County
- Coordinates: 39°41′10″N 85°10′20″W
- Country: United States
- State: Indiana
- County: Fayette

Government
  - Type: Indiana township

Area
  - Total: 27.38 sq mi (70.9 km^{2})
  - Land: 27.38 sq mi (70.9 km^{2})
  - Water: 0 sq mi (0 km^{2})
- Elevation: 991 ft (302 m)

Population (2020)
  - Total: 6,210
  - Density: 235.6/sq mi (91.0/km^{2})
- FIPS code: 18-31792
- GNIS feature ID: 453386

Harrison Township is one of nine townships in Fayette County, Indiana. As of the 2010 census, its population was 6,450 and it contained 3,046 housing units.

== History ==
Harrison Township was organized in 1819.

== Geography ==
According to the 2010 census, the township has a total area of 27.38 square miles (70.9 km^{2}), all land.

=== Cities and towns ===
- Connersville (northwest half)

=== Unincorporated towns ===
- Harrisburg

(This list is based on USGS data and may include former settlements.)

=== Adjacent townships ===
- Washington Township, Wayne County (northeast)
- Waterloo Township (east)
- Connersville Township (south)
- Fairview Township (west)
- Posey Township (northwest)

=== Major highways ===
- Indiana State Road 1
