= Waterloo Township, Indiana =

Waterloo Township
- Township
- Location of Waterloo Township in Fayette County
- Coordinates: 39°41′42″N 85°04′43″W
- Country: United States
- State: Indiana
- County: Fayette

Government
  - Type: Indiana township

Area
  - Total: 17.15 sq mi (44.4 km^{2})
  - Land: 17.15 sq mi (44.4 km^{2})
  - Water: 0 sq mi (0 km^{2})
- Elevation: 1,007 ft (307 m)

Population (2020)
  - Total: 531
  - Density: 35.4/sq mi (13.7/km^{2})
- FIPS code: 18-81314
- GNIS feature ID: 454026

Waterloo Township is one of nine townships in Fayette County, Indiana. As of the 2010 census, its population was 607 and it contained 240 housing units.

== History ==
Waterloo Township was organized in 1821.

The Thomas Ranck Round Barn was added to the National Register of Historic Places in 1983.

== Geography ==
According to the 2010 census, the township has a total area of 17.15 square miles (44.4 km^{2}), all land.

=== Unincorporated towns ===
- Springersville
- Waterloo

=== Adjacent townships ===
- Abington Township, Wayne County (northeast)
- Brownsville Township, Union County (east)
- Liberty Township, Union County (southeast)
- Jennings Township (south)
- Connersville Township (southwest)
- Harrison Township (west)
- Washington Township, Wayne County (northwest)
