= Posey Township, Fayette County, Indiana =

Posey Township
- Township
- Location of Posey Township in Fayette County
- Coordinates: 39°44′42″N 85°14′34″W
- Country: United States
- State: Indiana
- County: Fayette

Government
  - Type: Indiana township

Area
  - Total: 31.15 sq mi (80.7 km^{2})
  - Land: 31.1 sq mi (81 km^{2})
  - Water: 0.05 sq mi (0.13 km^{2})
- Elevation: 1,050 ft (320 m)

Population (2020)
  - Total: 431
  - Density: 16.3/sq mi (6.3/km^{2})
- FIPS code: 18-61308
- GNIS feature ID: 453762

Posey Township is one of nine townships in Fayette County, Indiana. As of the 2010 census, its population was 508 and it contained 202 housing units.

== History ==
Posey Township was organized in 1823. It was named for Governor Thomas Posey.

The William Lowry House was added to the National Register of Historic Places in 1982.

== Geography ==
According to the 2010 census, the township has a total area of 31.15 square miles (80.7 km^{2}), of which 31.1 square miles (81 km^{2}) (or 99.84%) is land and 0.05 square miles (0.13 km^{2}) (or 0.16%) is water.

=== Unincorporated towns ===
- Bentonville

(This list is based on USGS data and may include former settlements.)

=== Adjacent townships ===
- Dudley Township, Henry County (north)
- Jackson Township, Wayne County (northeast)
- Washington Township, Wayne County (east)
- Harrison Township (southeast)
- Fairview Township (south)
- Washington Township, Rush County (west)

=== Cemeteries ===
The township contains several cemeteries, the largest of which is adjacent to the Bentonville Christian Church. The remaining cemeteries are predominantly small family plots dating back to the 1800s.
