= Bentonville, Indiana =

- Unincorporated community
- Location within Indiana Location within the United States
- Coordinates: 39°44′43″N 85°11′39″W
- Country: United States
- State: Indiana
- County: Fayette
- Township: Posey
- Elevation: 1,063 ft (324 m)
- ZIP code: 47322
- GNIS feature ID: 430830

Bentonville is an unincorporated community in central Posey Township, Fayette County, Indiana, United States.

== History ==
Bentonville was platted in 1838. It was named for Thomas Hart Benton, a senator from Missouri.

Bentonville was once a booming "frontier" town during the early days of westward expansion and was a frequent stopping place for traders. Among the local landmarks is Alfred Loder's store (built in 1848 and was one of the first brick structures in the area), which still stands and is a private residence. Other remnants of the past are still visible. Across the corner from Loder's store is a cement watering trough used for watering horses, and south of town in the wooded area next to the site of the former Bentonville Christian Church (which was struck by a tornado in 2018), a one-room schoolhouse, although dilapidated, can be seen from the road.

== Location ==
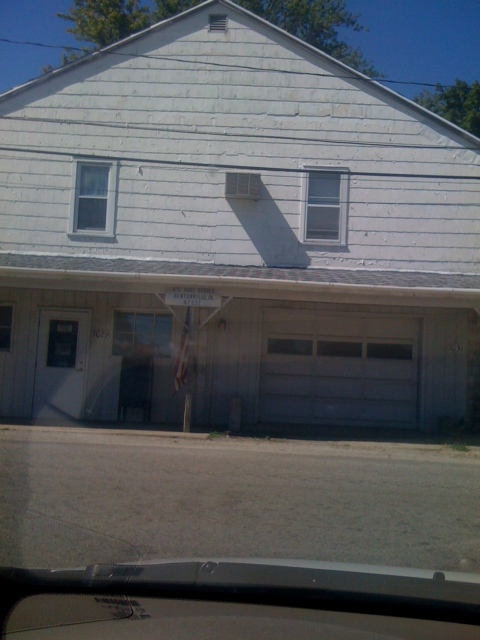
The Bentonville Post Office in September 2010.

It lies along County Road 700N northwest of the city of Connersville, the county seat of Fayette County.

Although Bentonville is unincorporated, it has a self-serviced post office, with the ZIP code of 47322, an independent Christian church (under reconstruction after 2018 tornado), and a volunteer fire department. Bentonville's Volunteer Fire Department serves 63 square miles throughout Fayette County, and also responds to emergency calls in Rush and Wayne counties when needed.
