= William Lowry House (Bentonville, Indiana) =

Historic house in Indiana, United States

- U.S. National Register of Historic Places
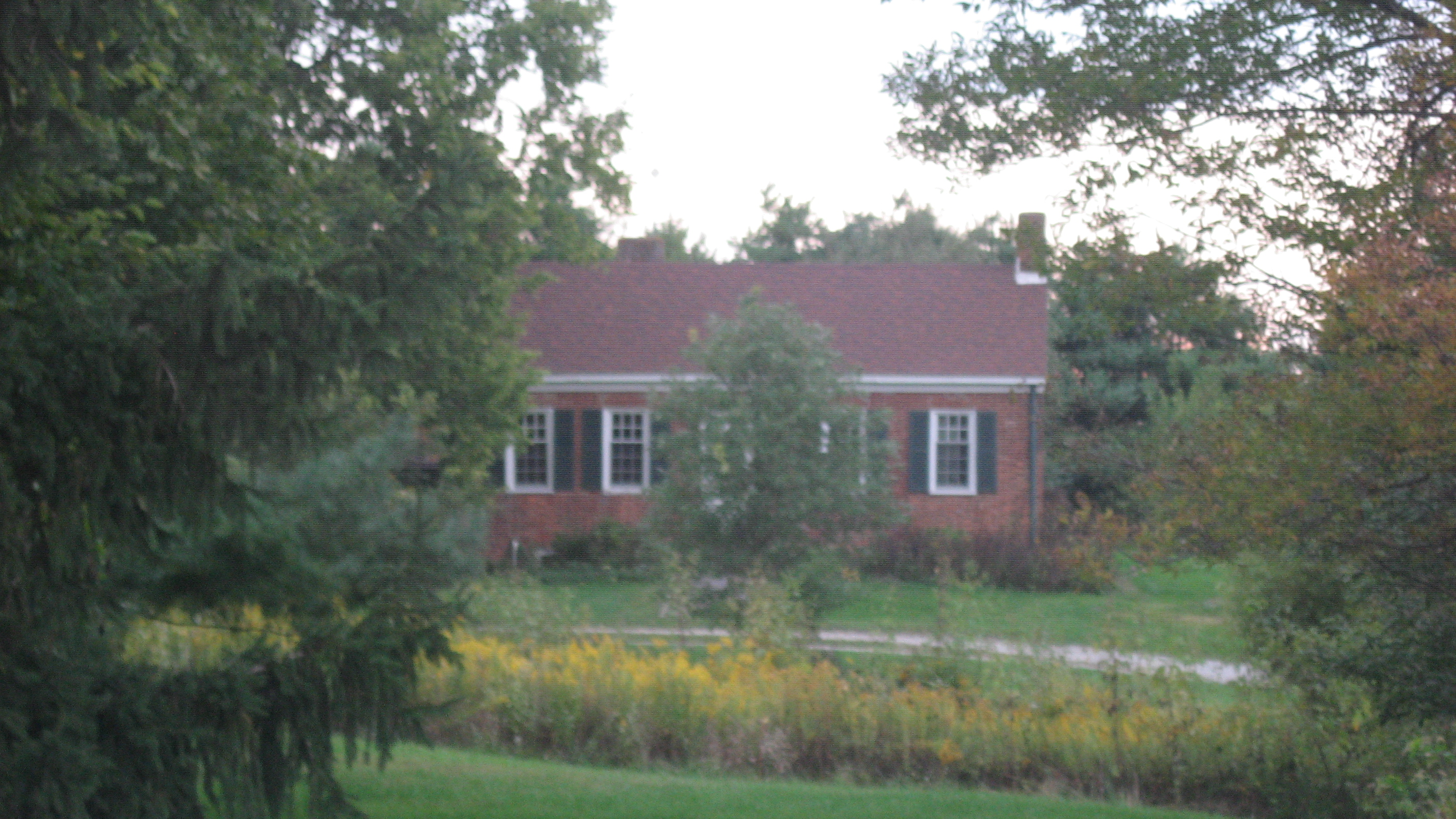
- William Lowry House, September 2011

- Location within Indiana Location within the United States
- Location: Kniese Rd., east of Bentonville, Posey Township, Fayette County, Indiana
- Coordinates: 39°43′51″N 85°11′12″W
- Area: 1 acre (0.40 ha)
- Built: c. 1825
- Architectural style: Federal
- NRHP reference No.: 82000036
- Added to NRHP: February 11, 1982

William Lowry House, also known as the Kniese-Chaudhuri House, is a historic home located in Posey Township, Fayette County, Indiana. It was built about 1825, and is a one-story, five-bay, L-plan, gable-roofed, Federal style brick cottage. It has a rear kitchen wing.

It was added to the National Register of Historic Places in 1982.
