= Round barn =

Circular storage building

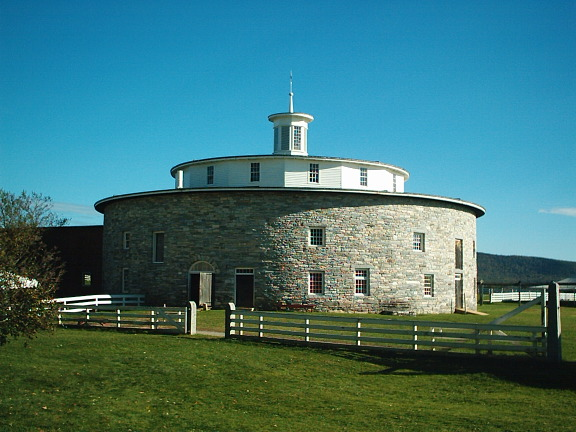
The round barn at Hancock Shaker Village

A round barn is a historic barn design that could be octagonal, polygonal, or circular in plan. Though round barns were not as popular as some other barn designs, their unique shape makes them noticeable. The years from 1880 to 1920 represent the height of round barn construction. Round barn construction in the United States can be divided into two overlapping eras. The first, the octagonal era, spanned from 1850 to 1900. The second, the true circular era, spanned from 1889 to 1936. The overlap meant that round barns of both types, polygonal and circular, were built during the latter part of the nineteenth century. Numerous round barns in the United States are listed on the National Register of Historic Places.

== History ==
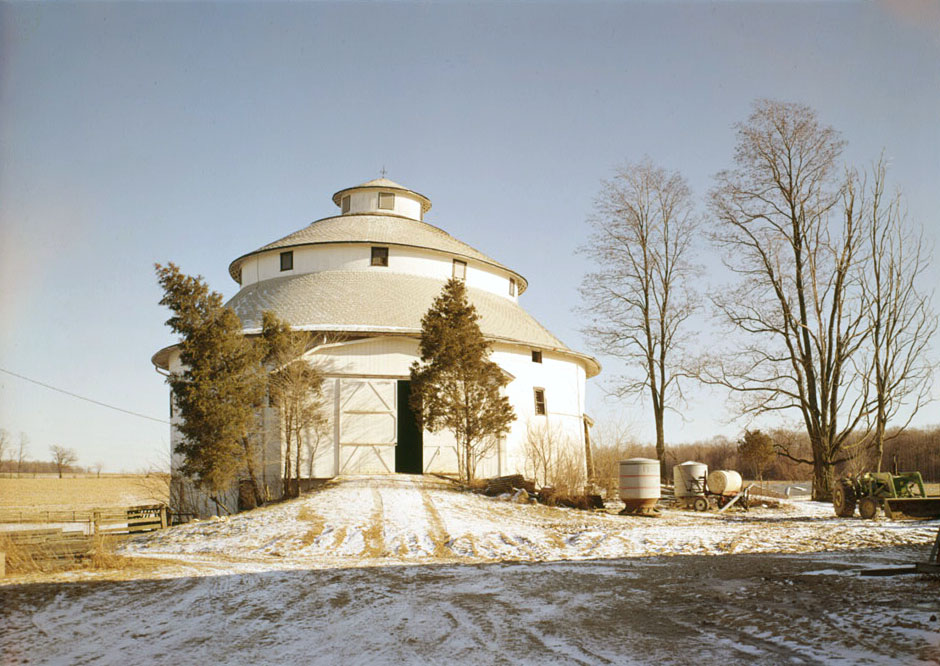
Thomas Ranck Round Barn in Indiana

Round barns date to the 18th and early 19th century. George Washington designed and built a sixteen-sided threshing barn at his Dogue Run Farm in Fairfax County, Virginia in 1793. The first truly round barn in North America was constructed in 1826 at Hancock Shaker Village. A few other round barns appeared on the American landscape before the Civil War.

Despite considerable publicity of the 1826 Shaker barn, the design did not become popular until the 1880s, when some agricultural colleges began to push the design as they taught progressive farming methods, based on the principles of industrial efficiency. It was between 1880 and 1920 that round barns were most popular in the United States, especially in the Midwest.

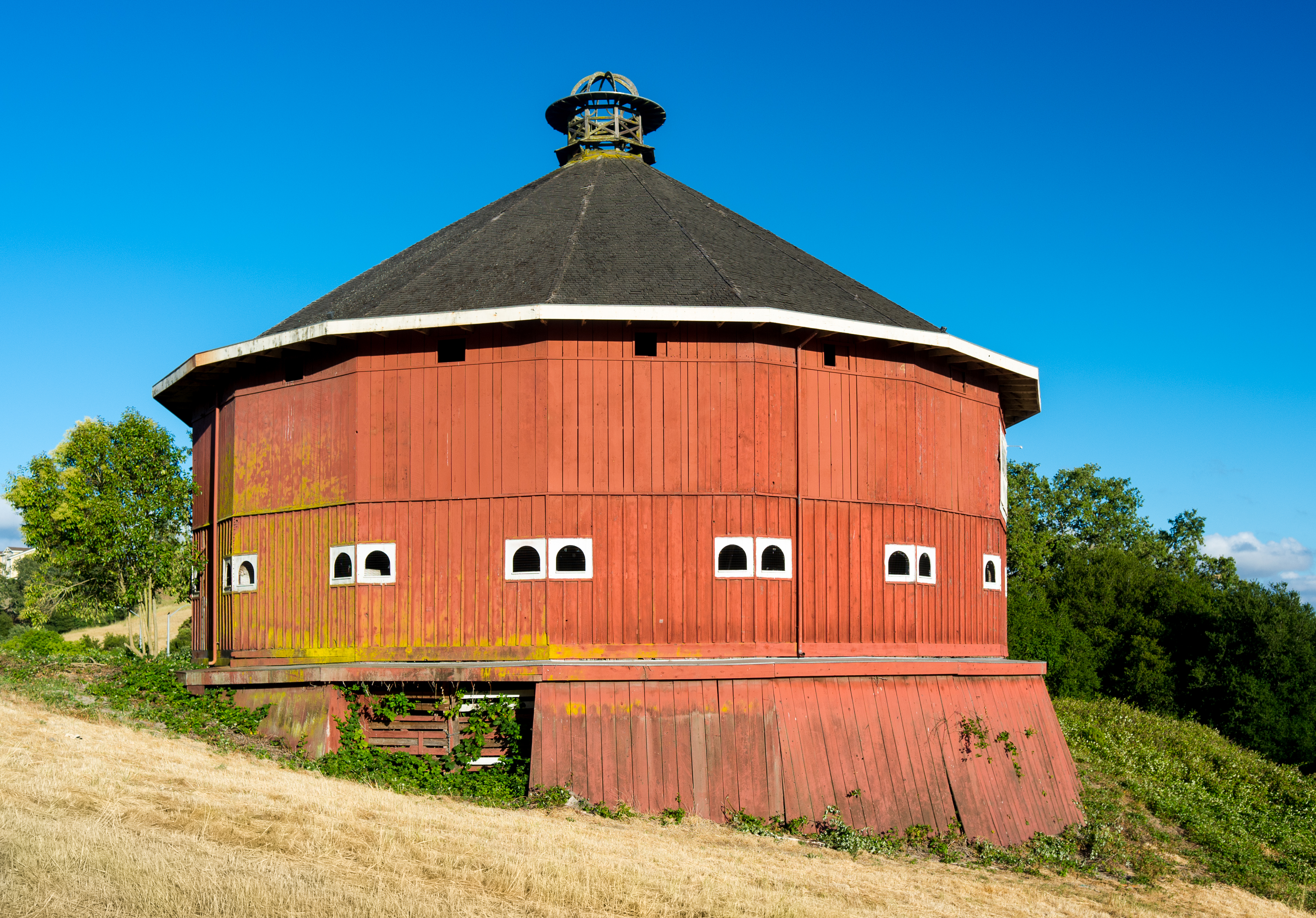
Fountaingrove Round Barn in Santa Rosa

The rise in popularity and the promotion of round barns occurred surrounding the new focus on efficiency. The circular shape has a greater volume-to-surface ratio than a square barn. Regardless of size, this made round barns cheaper to construct than similar-sized square or rectangular barns because they required less materials. The structural stability is also enhanced over that of a typical quadrilaterally shaped barn. Simplified construction lacking elaborate truss systems for the arched roof was also seen as an advantage. In the Midwest, particularly, the buildings were thought more resilient against prairie thunderstorms. The interior layout of round barns was promoted as more efficient, since farmers could work in a continuous direction. In the days before mechanization, labor-saving features were a big selling point.

The interest in round barns spread to California in the later 19th century and several were built there. Santa Rosa, California is home to the De Turk Round Barn, a well-preserved example built in the late 1870s by local settler and businessman Isaac De Turk.

Claims of round barn efficiency were overstated. The round barn never caught on as a standard barn, as some of those pushing the progressive, efficiency-based agricultural methods had hoped. The spread of machinery, especially with the Rural Electrification program, eliminated the advantages of labor-saving designs that were more complicated to build, and the popularity of round barns faded. Regardless, numerous round barns were constructed during the period of popularity the design enjoyed, and a large number still stand today.

== Round barn era ==
=== Octagonal ===
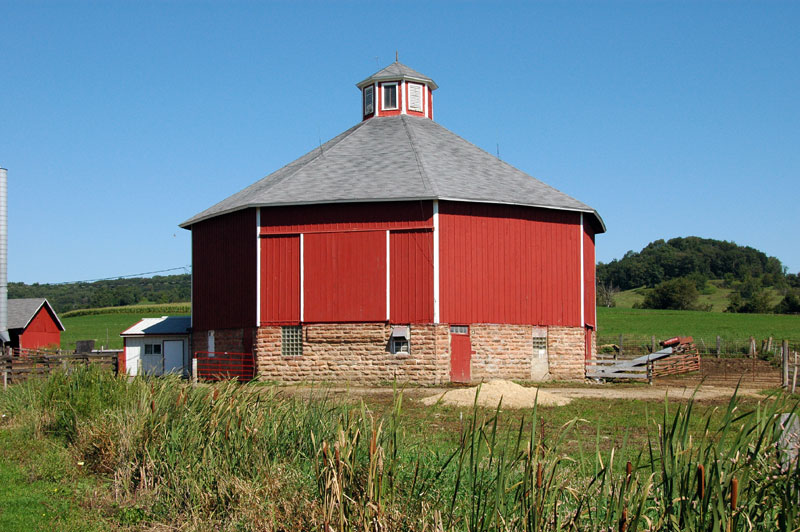
Tim Thering Octagon Barn (Plain Wisconsin)

The "Octagonal Era" of round barn design stretched from about 1850 until 1900. Round barns, such as Washington's, were often multi sided in their earliest incarnations. Multi-sided round barns came in a variety of polygonal shapes, including layouts of six, eight, nine, ten, twelve, fourteen and sixteen sides. Polygonal barns constructed before the advent of balloon framing tended to have interior spaces that were more rectangular than circular.

=== True circular ===
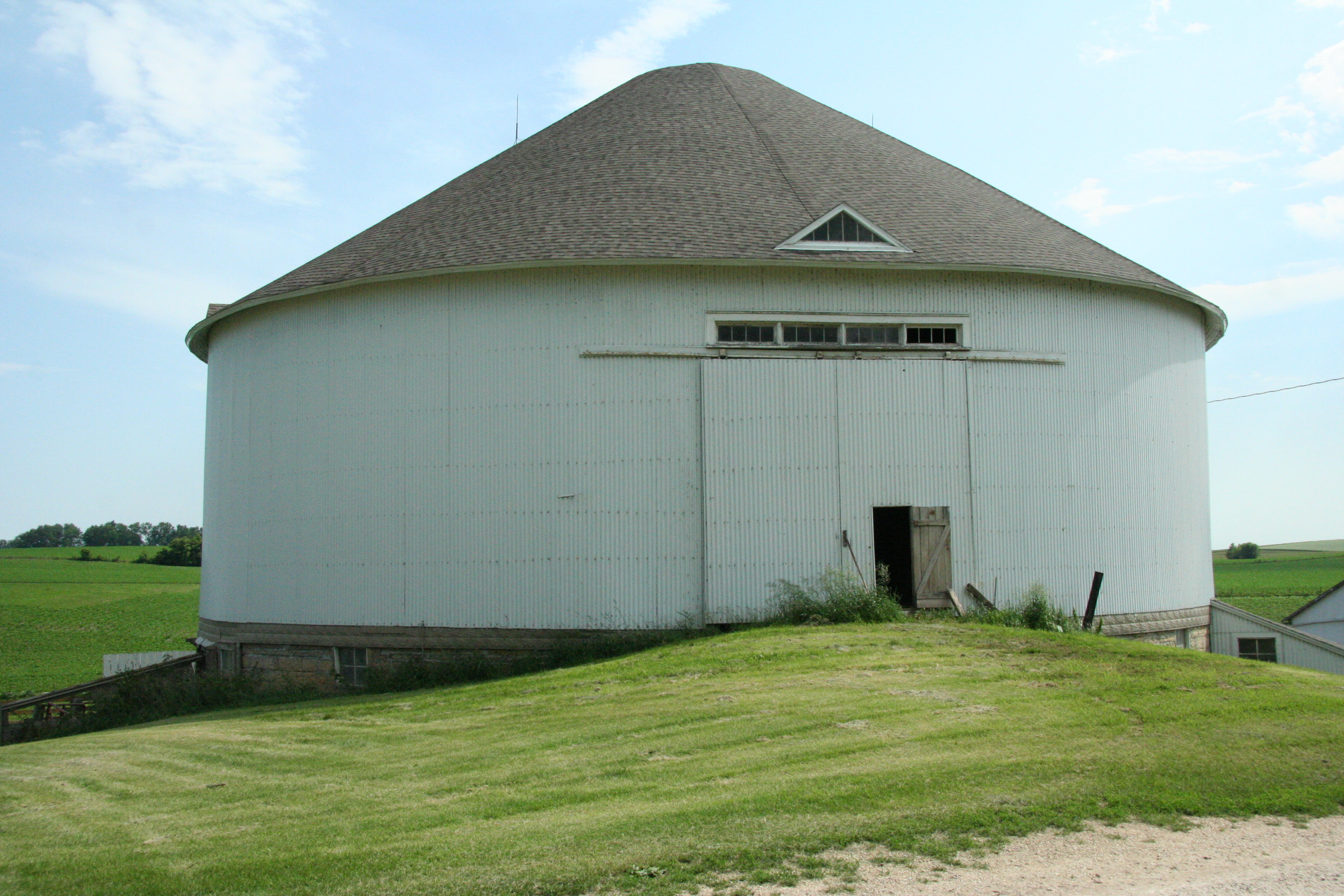
A true circular barn in Minnesota

The "True Circular Era" of round barn construction spanned from 1889 to 1936, overlapping the octagonal era and finally dwindling out as round barns fell out of popularity. True circular round barns began to rise as improvements in construction techniques made their design more practical. As balloon framing, circular silos and truly self-supporting roofs were developed, circular barns superseded polygonal structures and began to be built in greater number. Despite the gains in popularity for circular barns, polygonal barns continued to be built up through the height of the True Circular Era.

=== End of an era ===
By the 1920s round barn construction had begun to decline in some locations. In Illinois, the popularity of round barns was in part due to the University of Illinois round barns, and round barn construction had tapered off considerably. Several reasons have been given for the decline in the popularity of round barn designs. The standardization of the construction industry and the resulting decline in timber framing following the American Civil War is one possible reason. Another possibility is that the mechanization of American agriculture was more suited to rectangular barn design.

== Design ==
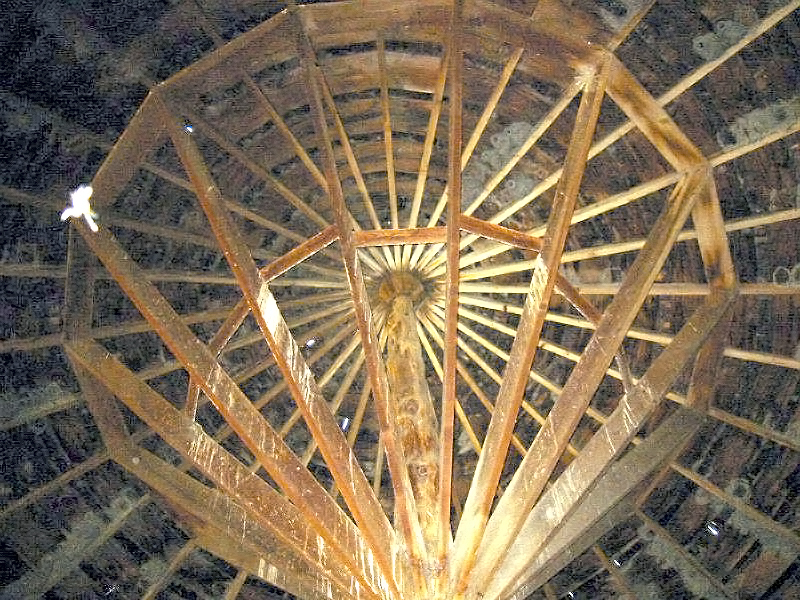
Interior view of the Pete French Round Barn near Frenchglen, Oregon

Designed in a distinctive circular shape, many of these barns were meant to take advantage of gravity to move hay from the loft to the cow stable below. In many cases, a silo was constructed to rise up through the round barn's center. The round barn was promoted as a labor-saving design by agricultural colleges as a progressive way to house dairy cattle.

In the case of the Pete French Round Barn near Frenchglen, Oregon, the barn was built with a rock wall around an inner stable area, and included a covered run around the wall where horses could be exercised during the harsh high desert winters.

The earliest round barns tend to have several flat sides, usually twelve or sixteen. They also tend to be wood-sided while the later round barns are more often faced with brick or glazed tile. The interior design of round barns shifted as well. The early round barns had cattle stanchions on the first floor with the whole of the loft used for hay and feed storage. Later barns possessed a central space which rose up from the ground level through the entire building. The cattle stanchions in this variation of round barn were arranged around a circular manger on the lower level. Above the stanchion level a circular wagon drive allowed hay to be unloaded into the central mow as the wagon circled the perimeter. The final stage of interior design in round barns included a storage silo through the center of the structures. These were not really added until silos became fixtures of American farms. Sometimes the central silo would project up through the roof.

Some round barns were built with hay hoods.

Advantages and disadvantages claimed for round barns are quite numerous.

== Influences ==
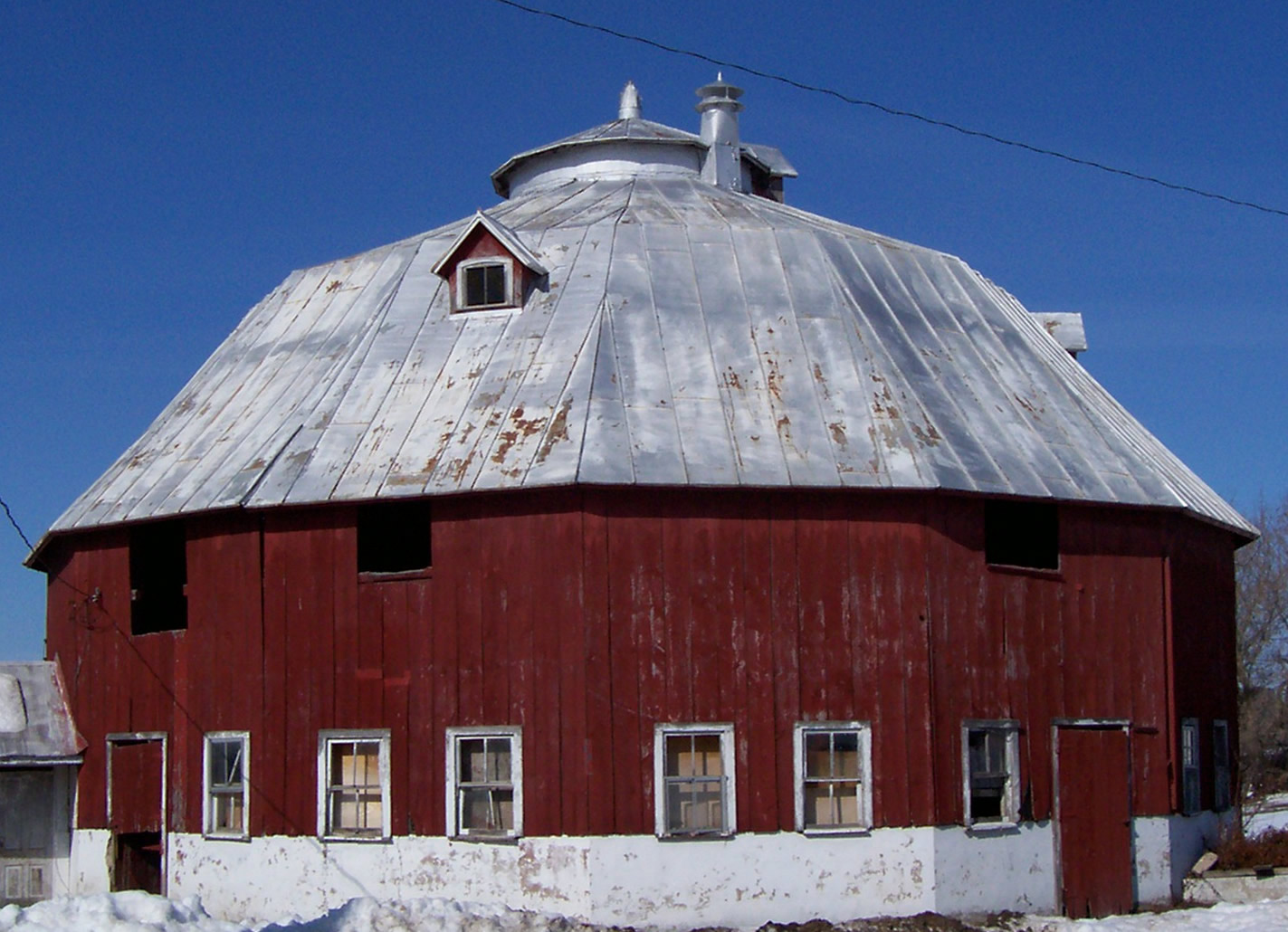
Ten-sided barn near Mauston, Wisconsin

Agricultural colleges began to promote the design technique as round barns came to prominence. However the provider of the initial impetus is the subject of some debate. In 1848 Orson Fowler published A Home For All: Of the Gravel Wall and Octagon Mode of Building, extolling the virtues of the octagonal shape in home construction. The book included a discussion on use of the shape in barns and other outbuildings. The book generated a flurry of octagonal home construction, especially in the New England and Middle Atlantic states. Some researchers have linked the earliest round barn constructions with Fowler's popular book because so many of the early round barns assumed the octagonal shape.

Other historians discount Fowler's influence on the beginning of the round barn era in the United States. Soike asserts that Fowler did not have any direct connection with any octagonal round barns. He noted that the octagon had ceased to be the basis for building constructions by the Civil War. In Indiana, for example, 219 round barns were constructed between 1850 and 1936; of those, 67 were polygonal, including 17 eight-sided barns built after 1900.

An old belief that the barns were round to keep the devil from hiding in the corners may have helped drive the popularity of round barn construction.

In the Midwest, especially in Illinois, the round barns at the University of Illinois led to an increase in the style's popularity statewide. This was partly due to the University of Illinois's Agricultural Experiment Station's publishing regular "Bulletins". The Agricultural Experiment Station Bulletin coupled with an article by H.C. Crouch touting round barns in the Illinois Agriculturalist led to the construction of round barns across the state. Anecdotal evidence of the impact of the University of Illinois round barns can be collected from farmers today. Stories about fathers and grandfathers recollect round barns being constructed on account of what was going on "over at the University".

Rochester, Indiana, county seat of Fulton County, hosts the annual Round Barn Festival in early June to assert Fulton County's status as the "Round Barn Capital of the World". The city also houses the Round Barn Golf Club at Mill Creek, whose clubhouse is in the renovated Gerig Round Barn.

== Distribution of round barns ==
There are about 20 surviving historic round barns in Canada. The United States has several hundred. In Europe, round barns are common, but there are some notable ones much older than those in North America.

== See also ==
- List of round barns
- Barn
