= Round barns in Illinois =

- Round Barns in Illinois TR
- U.S. National Register of Historic Places
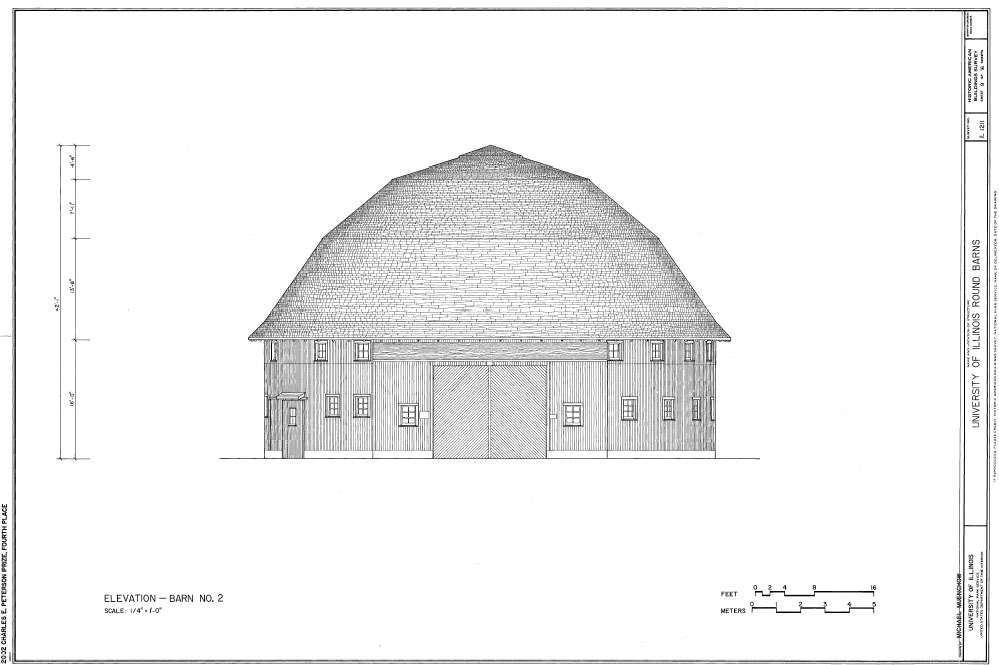
- This architectural drawing is of one of three University of Illinois round barns.
- Location: Illinois, United States
- Architectural style: Round barns
- MPS: MPL001 – Round Barns in Illinois Thematic Resources
- NRHP reference No.: 64000152,1982: 82000401, 82002536, 82002582, 82002586. 1983: 83000326. 1984: 84001150, 84001152, 84001155, 84001157, 84001164. 1992: 92001017. 1994: 94000030. 2003: 02000750.
- Added to NRHP: August 26, 1982; December 7, 1982; 1983; February 23, 1984; 1992; 1994; 2003.

Round barns in Illinois were the subject of a multiple property submission to the National Register of Historic Places in the U.S. state of Illinois. The submission consists of 18 Illinois round barns located throughout the state. The list had major additions in 1982 and 1984. In 1983, 1992 and 2003 one property was added to the submission and in 1994 a historic district at the University of Illinois, including three round barns, was added to the submission and the National Register of Historic Places. The highest concentration of round barns on the submission occurs in Stephenson County. Five Stephenson County round barns were added to the National Register on February 23, 1984.

== Significance ==
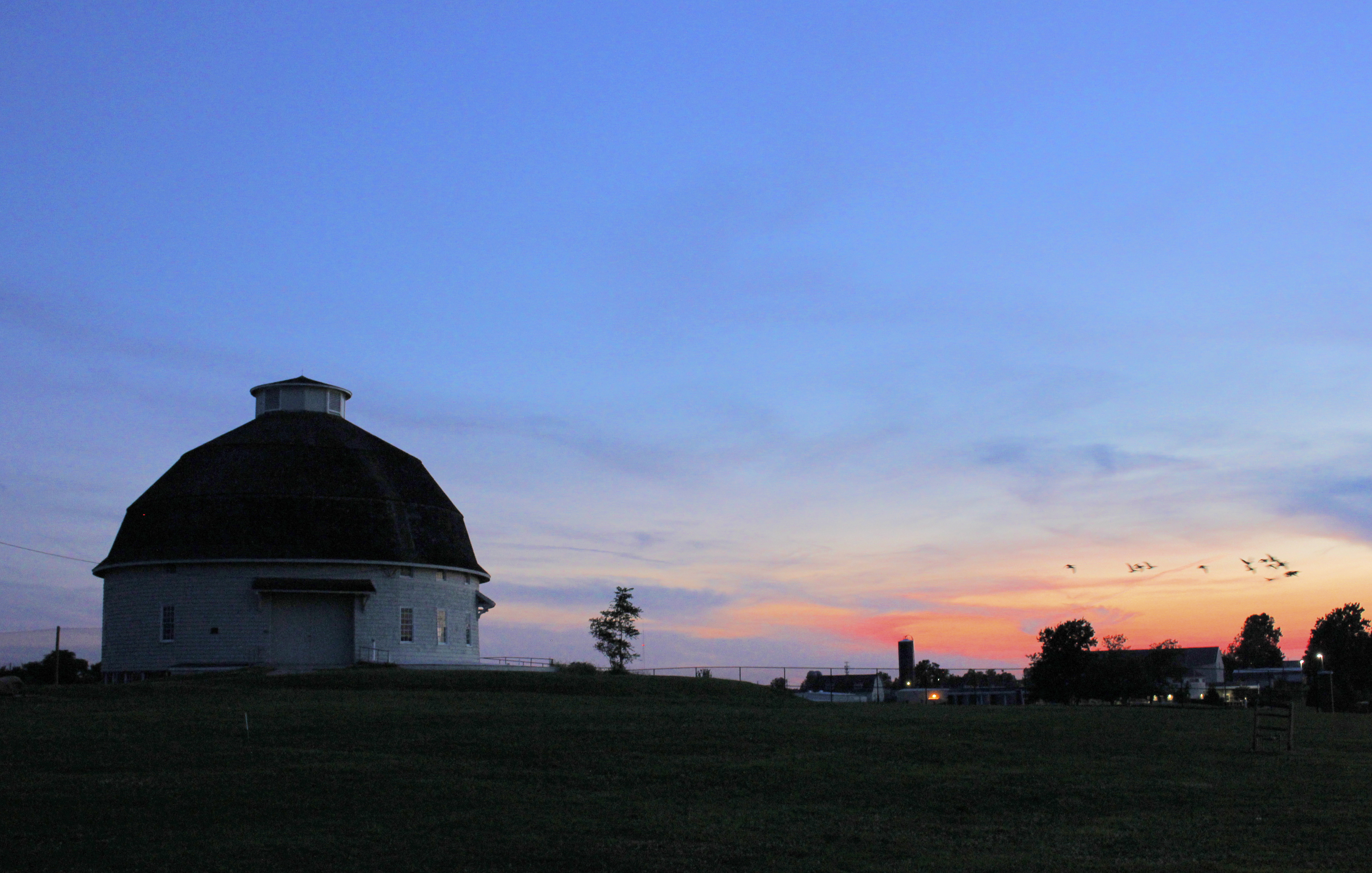
One of the barns on the University of Illinois' campus at sunset

Illinois, as home to the Agricultural Experiment Station at the University of Illinois, played a key role in promoting and popularizing the round barn design. The three round barns that are now part of the historic district at the experiment station helped influence Illinoisians and, in turn, other Midwesterners, to build round barns. In the case of the Raymond Schulz Round Barn, near Pontiac, Illinois, it was constructed specifically because its owner had viewed the round barns at the university.

The round barn was the last of five types of American barns to be built by carpenters, the others being the Dutch, English, connected and Pennsylvania barns. Collectively, they represent the foray of science into the field of agriculture.

== Barns ==
The round barn multiple property submission (MPS) in Illinois includes 18 round barns.

=== Original submission ===
Seven round barns were added to the National Register per the original MPS in 1982. At the time, just one other Illinois round barn was listed on the Register, the Ryan Round Barn in Henry County. Three of the 1982 round barns have since been removed from the Register, most likely due to demolition or destruction, the John McCarthy Round Barn, the Clyde Leek Round Barn and the Clarence Forehand Round Barn were removed from the listing in December 1995. The other barns listed in 1982 were: the Raymond Schulz Round Barn, Virginia Tillery Round Barn, Clarence Kleinkopf Round Barn and, in December, the Ron George Round Barn in Will County. The other three were added to the Register on August 26, 1982. An eighth round barn was determined eligible and nominated to the Register between December 1982 and February 1983, but the owner of the Willard White Round Barn in DeKalb County, near Hinckley, objected to the nomination, and the barn was not listed.

=== Lewis Round Barn ===
The Lewis Round Barn is located in Mendon, Illinois. The barn has been restored and relocated and is the latest addition to the Round Barn MPS. It was added to the National Register of Historic Places in 2003.

=== Stephenson County area ===
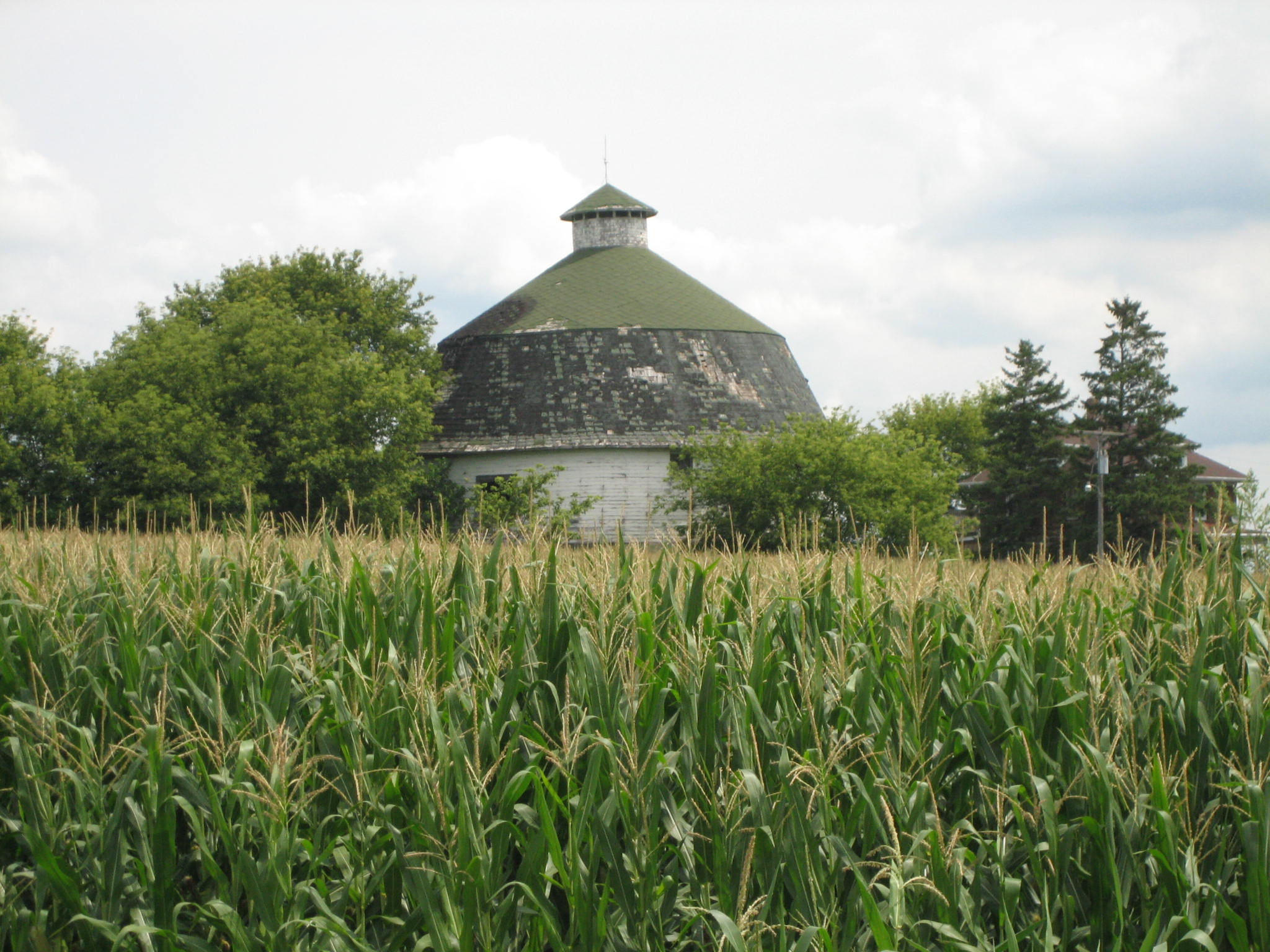
The James Bruce Round Barn near Freeport, Illinois

At the time of the 1984 addition to the Round Barn MPS Stephenson County, Illinois had more round barns than any other county in the United States. Of the 31 round barns constructed in the four county area that makes up the Stephenson County area for the purpose of the MPS, 21 are found within the borders of Stephenson County. The other ten are spread out over Winnebago County, Illinois, Green County, Wisconsin and Rock County, Wisconsin. The 21 barns in the county exceeds the 18 round barns in Vernon County, Wisconsin and the 12 round barns in Fulton County, Indiana. On the original January 1984 nomination seven round barns were included in the Stephenson County area, of those six were added to the MPS and, thus, the National Register of Historic Places. As of 2007 five of the six round barns listed in 1984 are still on the Register. They are the Dennis Otte Round Barn, the Gerald Harbach Round Barn, James Bruce Round Barn, Chris Jensen Round Barn and the Charles Fehr Round Barn. The Robert Weber Round Barn is in nearby Winnebago County.

=== Robert Buckles barn ===
The Buckles Round Barn, located in Logan County near Mount Pulaski, was added to the National Register of Historic Places, and the Round Barn MPS, on February 10, 1983. Its roof was damaged after a 1927 tornado and remained damaged until a $30,000 repair and restoration was undertaken in 1982. This round barn was built in 1917.

=== University of Illinois ===
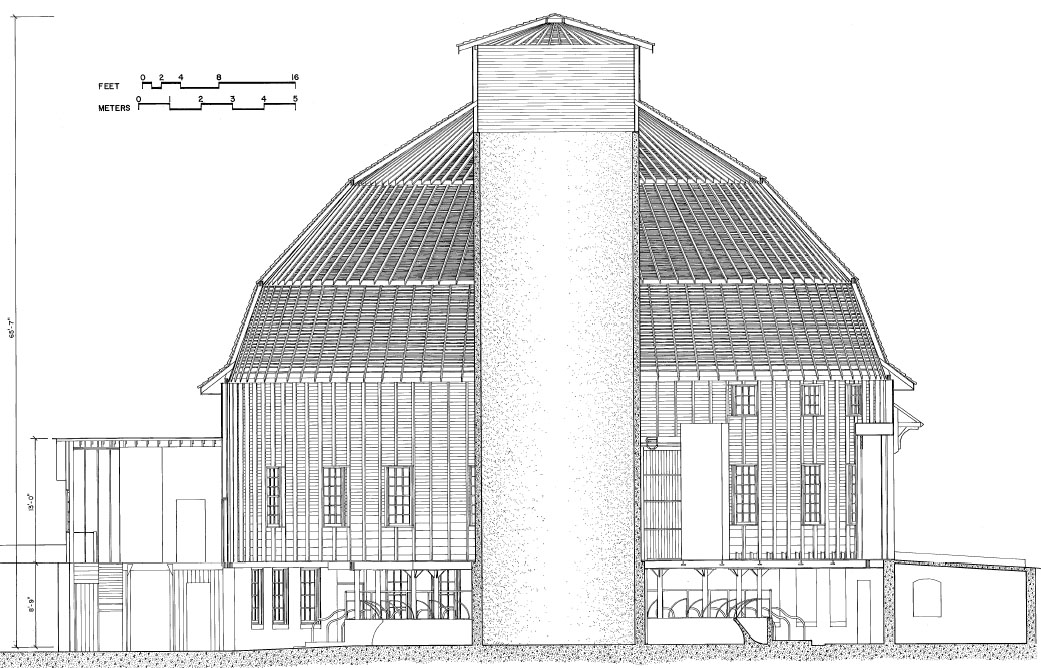
A to-scale cutaway of one of the U of I barns, note the center silo

Part of the 1994 National Register of Historic Places listing for the University of Illinois Experimental Dairy Farm Historic District includes three round barns. The barns were constructed every two years from 1908 thru 1912. The barns are known by the simple designations, Barn #1, Barn #2 and Building #857. Though all round barns, Building #857 includes a rectangular brick wing attached to main round section of the building.

=== Wheeler-Magnus Round Barn ===
The Wheeler-Magnus Round Barn is the only round barn listed on the National Register of Historic Places located in Cook County. The barn was added to both the Round Barn MPS and the Register in 1992.

== Other Illinois round barns ==
There are, certainly, dozens of additional round barns standing throughout Illinois. Of the round barns listed on the National Register of Historic Places just one was listed before the development of the MPS, the Ryan Round Barn north of Kewanee.

== See also ==
- List of round barns#Illinois, a tabulation of all known Illinois round barns
