= Robert Weber Round Barn =

- U.S. National Register of Historic Places
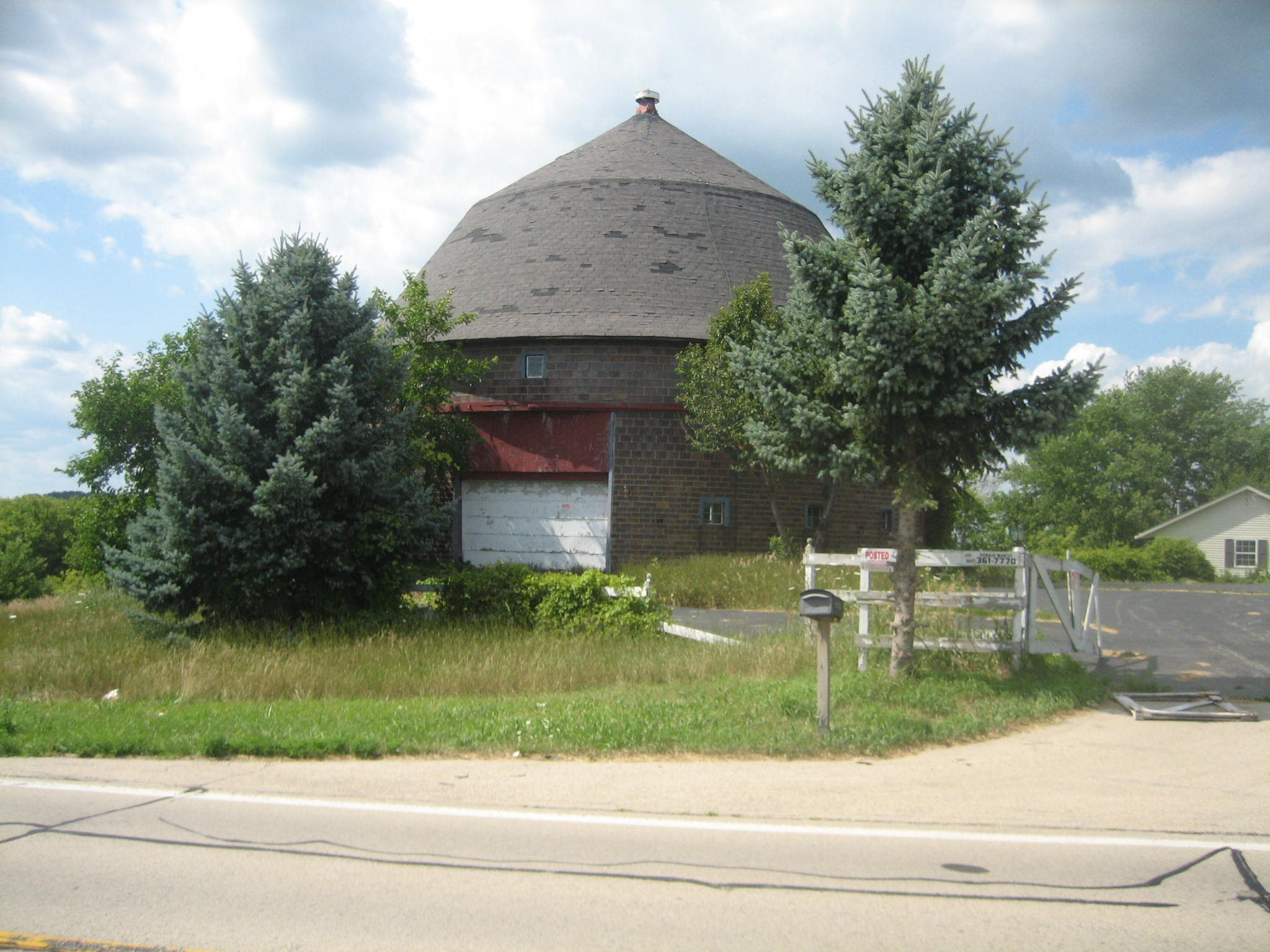

- Location within Illinois Location within the United States
- Location: Harrison Township Winnebago County, Illinois
- Nearest city: Durand
- Coordinates: 42°24′43″N 89°14′11″W
- Area: less than one acre
- Built: 1917
- Built by: Haar Brothers
- Architectural style: Round barn
- MPS: Round Barns in Illinois Thematic Resources
- NRHP reference No.: 84001172
- Added to NRHP: February 23, 1984

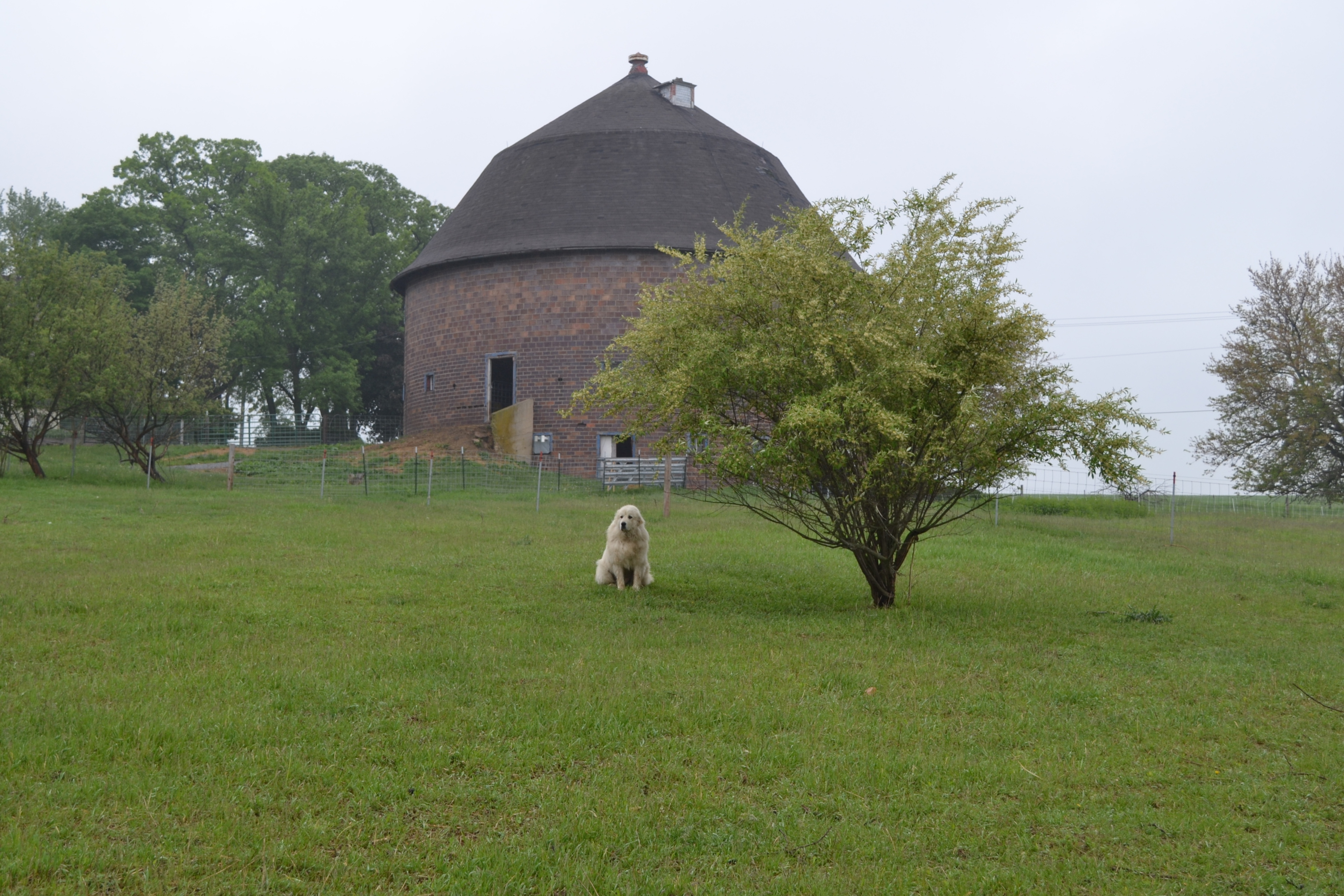

The Robert Weber Round Barn is a round barn located east of Durand, Illinois, United States along Illinois Route 75 in Harrison Township. The Weber barn was constructed in 1917 and features a roof designed and built by the Haas Brothers, who worked on other area round barns. The barn is 55 feet (17 m) in diameter and features a 24-foot (7.3 m) diameter central silo. The design of the Weber Round Barn stands out from other area round barns in its vitrified tile walls, a development used in later period American round barns. The Robert Weber Round Barn was added to the U.S. National Register of Historic Places in 1984.

== History ==
The Robert Weber Round Barn was built in 1917 east of Durand, Illinois in Harrison Township along Illinois Route 75. When the building was nominated for inclusion on the U.S. National Register of Historic Places in 1984 it was owned by Robert Weber.

== Design ==
The barn building has a diameter of 55 feet (17 m) and contains a central silo with a diameter of 24 feet (7.3 m). Both the barn and silo walls are constructed of brown, hollow vitrified tile; each tile measures 1-foot (0.30 m) by 4¾ inches. The Weber Round Barn was designed as a bank barn, its loft is entered on the north side via an earthen ramp that leads to a metal framed door. Livestock entry is made on the west side of the barn through another metal framed door, in addition, all windows are metal framed.

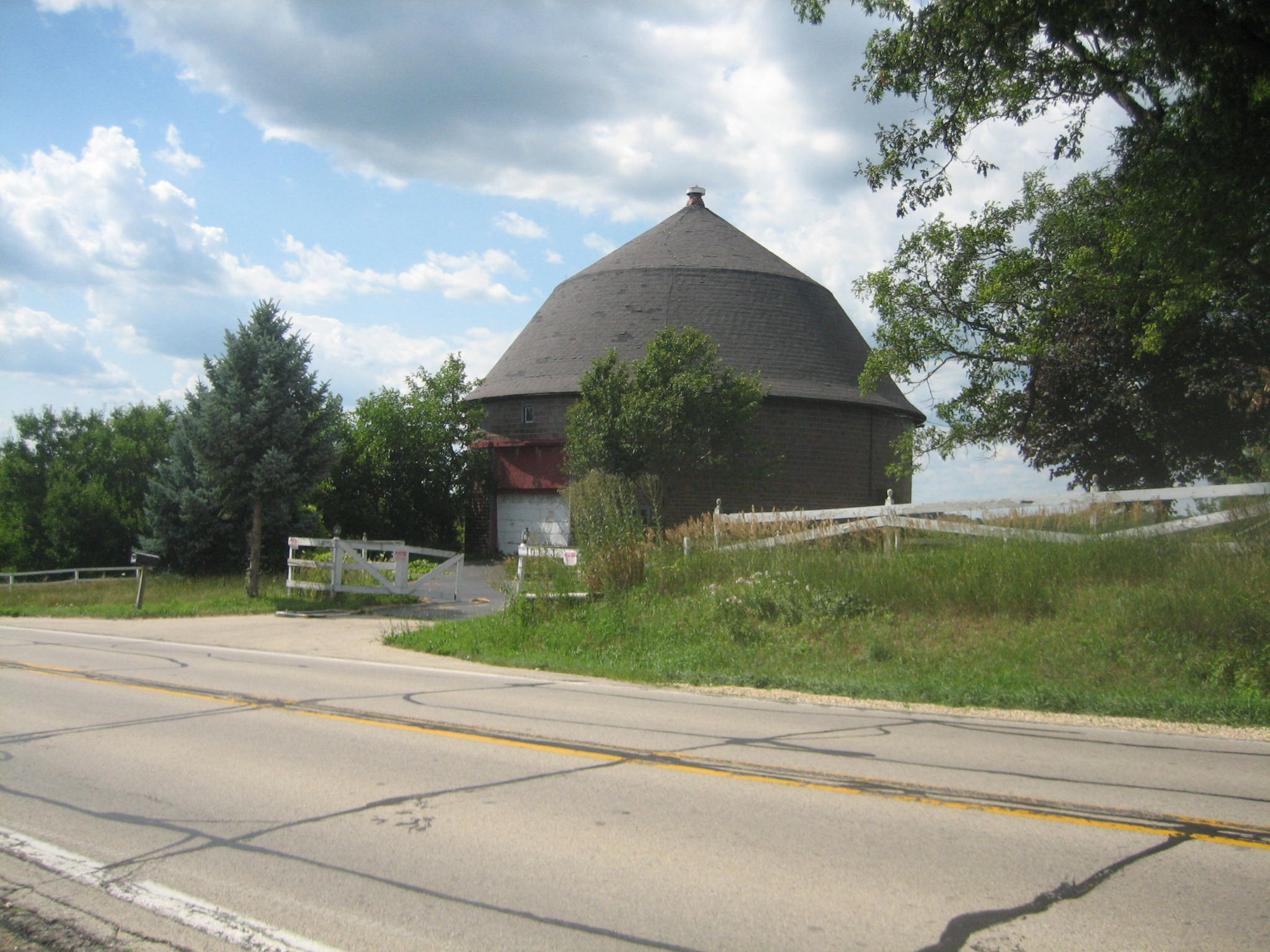
The round barn from a different angle

The single hip roof is supported by braces on either side of every rafter in a style promoted by the University of Illinois' Agricultural Experiment Station. The roof is covered in wooden shingles and capped by a small metal ventilator. The roof design and construction, by the Haas Brothers, connects it closely with round barns found in Stephenson County, Illinois that feature Haas Brothers construction. The Weber Barn was the last in the Stephenson County area that the Haas Brothers worked on. The Weber Round Barn does differ from the barns in neighboring Stephenson County in its vitrified tile wall. This type of tile wall demonstrates an important period in the evolution of round barn design. Vitrified tile was preferred by builders during the final period of American round barn construction.

The Weber Round Barn stands out from other round barns, such as those in Stephenson County, as well. Compared to those barns, the Dennis Otte Round Barn, the Gerald Harbach Round Barn, James Bruce Round Barn, Chris Jensen Round Barn and the Charles Fehr Round Barn, the Weber Round Barn has an air of sophistication. This is due to its masonry walls, specially braced hip roof and metal framed windows and doors.

== Significance ==
The Robert Weber Round Barn is one of 31 round barns that were constructed in a four county area, the Stephenson County area, that includes Winnebago County, Stephenson County and Rock and Green Counties in Wisconsin. Twenty one of those barns are within Stephenson County, just west of the Weber Barn. The Weber Barn is also significant for its tile walls which demonstrate a later period round barn preference.

The Weber Round Barn was nominated for the U.S. National Register of Historic Places in 1984 as part of the inaugural nomination through the Round Barns in Illinois Thematic Resources Multiple Property Submission. This means it met the criteria laid out beforehand for Illinois round barns. The building was listed on the National Register on February 2, 1984.

== See also ==
- Charles Fehr Round Barn
- Dennis Otte Round Barn
- Gerald Harbach Round Barn
- James Bruce Round Barn
