= Erin Township =

Erin Township may refer to:

== Canada ==
- Erin, Ontario, formerly Erin Township

== United States ==
- Erin Township, Stephenson County, Illinois
- Erin Township, Hancock County, Iowa
- Erin Township, Rice County, Minnesota
- Erin Township, Michigan, a former township in Macomb County
