= Illinois Route 70 =

State highway in Winnebago County, Illinois, US

Illinois Route 70
- Trask Bridge Road
- IL 70 highlighted in red

Route information
- Maintained by IDOT
- Length: 19.01 mi (30.59 km)
- Existed: 1924–present

Major junctions
- South end: US 20 Bus. in Rockford
- IL 75 in Durand
- North end: West Howard Street/Oak Street in Durand

Location
- Country: United States
- State: Illinois
- Counties: Winnebago

Highway system
- Illinois State Highway System; Interstate; US; State; Tollways; Scenic
| ← I-70 | → IL 71 |

Illinois Route 70 is a state road in far north-central Illinois. It runs from West Howard Street/Oak Street in Durand to Business U.S. Route 20 in Rockford. This is a distance of 19.01 miles (30.59 km).

== Route description ==
Illinois 70 is the main route northwest of Rockford, and is called Kilburn Avenue and Trask Bridge Road in this area. The route serves mainly rural areas and consists of two-lane undivided surface street for its entire length.

== History ==
SBI Route 70 ran from Durand to Rockford to Mendota, located about 60 miles (97 km) south of Rockford. In 1940, U.S. Route 51 replaced Illinois 70 from Mendota to Rockford, and Illinois 70 was pulled back to its current intersection with what was then U.S. 20.

== Major intersections ==
The entire route is in Winnebago County.

| Location | mi | km | Destinations | Notes |
|---|---|---|---|---|
| Rockford | 0.00 | 0.00 | US 20 Bus. | Southern terminus |
| | 17.9 | 28.8 | IL 75 (Freeport Road) | |
| Durand | 19.01 | 30.59 | West Howard Street/Oak Street | Northern terminus |
1.000 mi = 1.609 km; 1.000 km = 0.621 mi
