= Virginia Tillery Round Barn =

- U.S. National Register of Historic Places
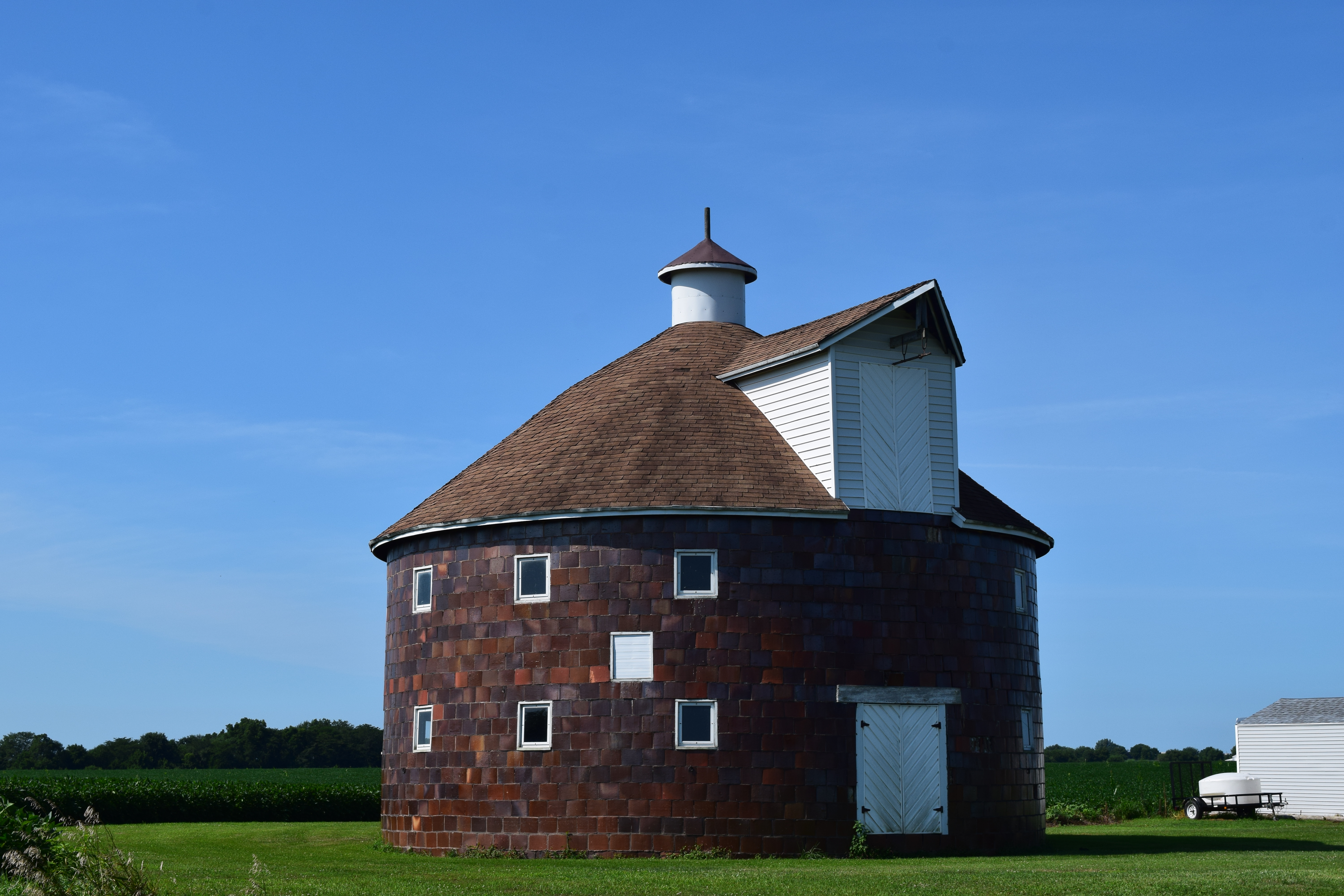

- Location within Illinois Location within the United States
- Location: County Road 738
- Nearest city: White Hall
- Coordinates: 39°26′26″N 90°26′37″W
- Built: 1912
- Architectural style: Round barns
- MPS: MPL001 - Round Barns in Illinois Thematic Resources
- NRHP reference No.: 82002536
- Added to NRHP: August 26, 1982

The Virginia Tillery Round Barn is a round barn located on County Route 738 west of White Hall in Greene County, Illinois. The barn was built in the fall of 1912 for farmer Harry C. Price. With a 36 feet 6 inches (11.13 m) diameter, the barn is relatively small for an Illinois round barn; the median diameter of Illinois round barns was 60 feet (18 m). Its size suggests that it served as a general-purpose barn, not a dairy barn like the state's larger round barns. Brown tile blocks were used to build the barn, which is topped by a wood shingle roof with a cupola.

Hay was taken in through the door above the barn's north entrance.

The barn was added to the National Register of Historic Places on August 6, 1982. It was one of several barns added as part of the Round Barns in Illinois Multiple Property Submission.
