= Gerald Harbach Round Barn =

- U.S. National Register of Historic Places
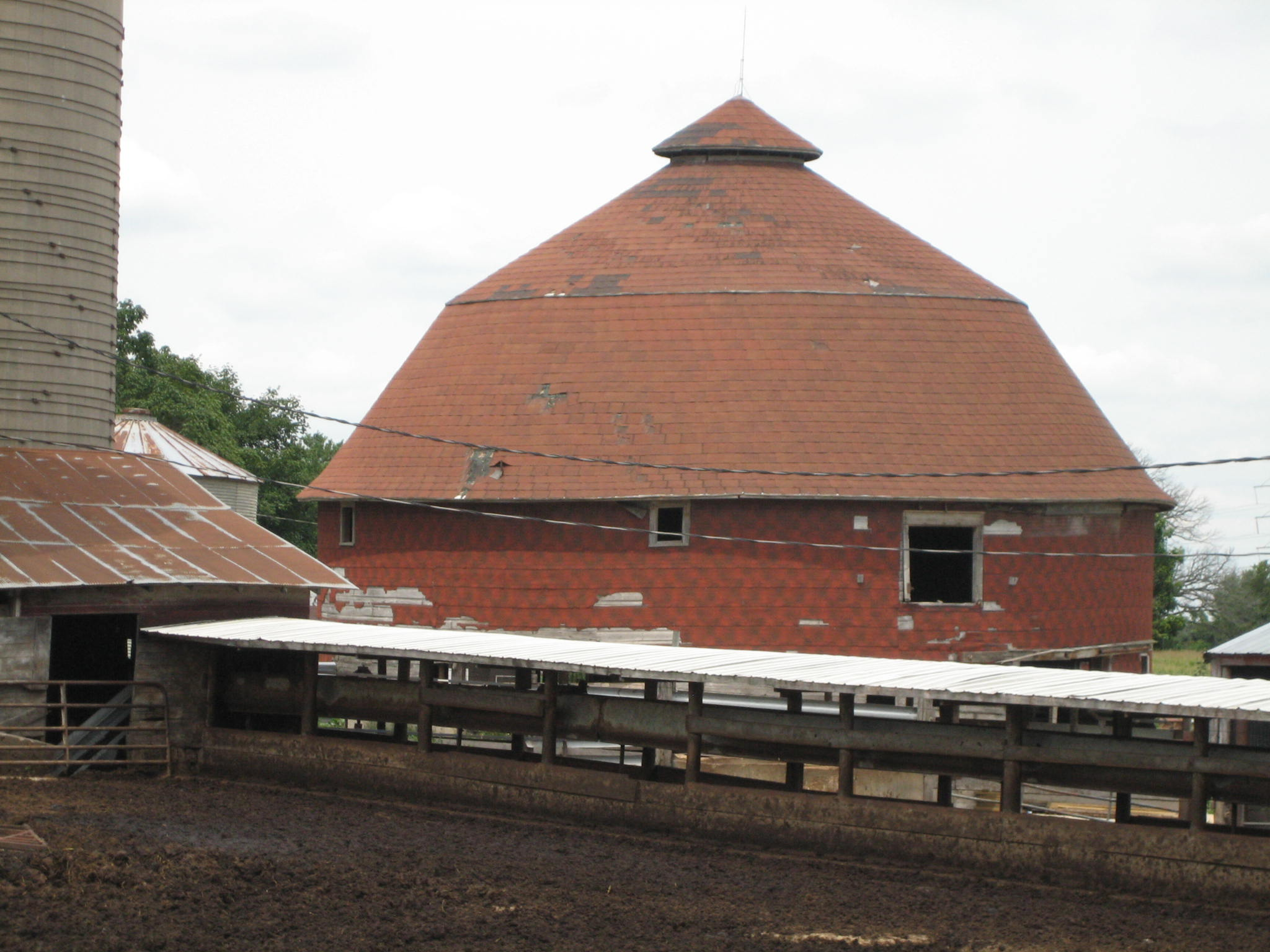

- Location within Illinois Location within the United States
- Nearest city: Eleroy, Stephenson County, Illinois
- Coordinates: 42°19′41″N 89°45′12″W
- Area: less than one acre
- Built: c. 1914
- Architectural style: Round barn
- MPS: Round Barns in Illinois TR
- NRHP reference No.: 84001155
- Added to NRHP: February 23, 1984

The Gerald Harbach Round Barn is a round barn near Eleroy, an unincorporated community in Stephenson County, Illinois, United States. The builder and designer of the building are unknown but it is very similar to round barns designed by the team of Jeremiah Shaffer and the Hass Brothers. It was probably built around the same time as the James Bruce Round Barn, erected in 1914, in Freeport. The Harbach Round Barn was added to the U.S. National Register of Historic Places in 1984.

== Architecture ==
The 55 foot (16.8 m) diameter Gerald Harbach Round Barn stands upon a poured concrete foundation near the unincorporated community of Eleroy in Stephenson County, Illinois, United States. The wood sided exterior has been covered in asphalt since the building's construction. The barn's main, ground level entrance, is in the west quadrant and over the entrance is the loft door which is a rectangular opening in the ceiling. Each rafter of the single hip roof is braced with a nailed beam four feet (1.2 m) above and four feet (1.2 m) below, on the opposite side, the roof hip. In addition, there are beams nailed diagonally between the studs in the loft to brace the building against strong winds. The roof exterior is capped with a short cupola.

Out of the extant barns in Stephenson County that have been listed on the National Register of Historic Places the Harbach Round Barn is the most altered from its original state. The two, interior loft plates have been replaced with steel beams, hoisted by steel jacks. The animal entrance, in the southeast quadrant of the barn, has also been sealed since the building is primarily used for storage.

The precise builder and designer of the Harbach Round Barn are unknown. The characteristics of the roof joints and studs suggest that the barn was built around the same time as the Charles Fehr Round Barn, near Orangeville, and the James Bruce Round Barn near Freeport, though, much like the designer, the exact date of construction is unknown. The Bruce Round Barn, a Shaffer and Haas structure was built in 1914. These characteristics also suggest that the barn was designed by the Haas Brothers–Jeremiah Shaffer team.

== Significance ==
The Gerald Harbach Round Barn is one of 31 round barns that were constructed in a four county area, the Stephenson County area, that includes Winnebago County, Stephenson County and Rock and Green Counties in Wisconsin. Twenty one of those barns, including the Harbach Round Barn are within Stephenson County.

The Harbach Round Barn is an example of a noteworthy design variation within round barn design, specifically because of its specially braced roof. It is not entirely unique; its cupola and roof make it very similar to the Fehr Round Barn. The main difference in the Fehr and Harbach Round Barns is the Harbach's lack of a central storage silo. The building was added to the U.S. National Register of Historic Places on February 23, 1984 as part of a Multiple Property Submission.

== See also ==
- Charles Fehr Round Barn
- Dennis Otte Round Barn
- James Bruce Round Barn
- Robert Weber Round Barn
