= Illinois Route 75 =

State highway in Illinois, US

Illinois Route 75
- Freeport Road
- IL 75 highlighted in red

Route information
- Maintained by IDOT
- Length: 41.64 mi (67.01 km)
- Existed: 1924–present

Major junctions
- West end: IL 26 in Freeport
- US 20 in Freeport; US 51 / IL 251 in South Beloit; I-39 / I-90 / US 51 in South Beloit
- East end: WIS 67 in South Beloit

Location
- Country: United States
- State: Illinois
- Counties: Stephenson, Winnebago

Highway system
- Illinois State Highway System; Interstate; US; State; Tollways; Scenic
← I-74	→ IL 76

Illinois Route 75 (IL 75) is an east–west state highway in north-central Illinois. It runs from downtown Freeport at Illinois Route 26 to WIS 67 at the Wisconsin state line southeast of Beloit, Wisconsin. This is a distance of 41.64 miles (67.01 km).

== Route description ==
Illinois 75 is the main route between Freeport and Beloit, and serves numerous rural areas along this alignment. It has two lanes and is an undivided surface street for its entire length, except at the interchange with U.S. Route 20 and the section east of Illinois Route 2.

== History ==
SBI Route 75 originally ran from Freeport to Rockton. It was extended in 1960 along Illinois Route 2 to U.S. Route 51 in South Beloit.

IL 75 was recently extended east past the former eastern terminus at I-39/I-90 (Jane Addams Tollway) to the Wisconsin state line and Wisconsin Highway 67.

== Major intersections ==
County	Location	mi	km	Destinations	Notes
Stephenson	Freeport	0.00	0.00	IL 26 (North West Avenue) – Forreston, Cedarville	Western terminus of IL 75.
Stephenson	Freeport	0.5	0.80	US 20 Bus. (Galena Avenue)	
Stephenson	Freeport	3.7	6.0	US 20 (Freeport Bypass) – Eleroy, Rockford	
Winnebago	Davis	17.9	28.8	CR 56 (Best Road)	
Winnebago	Durand	18.9	30.4	CR 18 south (Pecatonica Road)	
Winnebago	Durand	20.4	32.8	IL 70 (Center Road) – Rockford, Durand	
Winnebago	Durand	21.9	35.2	CR 47 south (Leech Road)	
Winnebago	Durand	22.9	36.9	CR 23 north (Wheeler Road)	Begin/end concurrency with CR 23.
Winnebago	Durand	23.5	37.8	CR 23 south (Moate Road)	Begin/end concurrency with CR 23.
Winnebago	Rockton	28.8	46.3	CR 24 (Meridian Road)	
Winnebago	Rockton	31.9	51.3	CR 13 south (Owen Center Road)	
Winnebago	Rockton	34.5	55.5	CR 64 south (Russell Street)	
Winnebago	South Beloit	36.1	58.1	IL 2 south – Rockford	Begin/end concurrency with IL 2.
Winnebago	South Beloit	36.5	58.7	CR 76 (Prairie Hill Road)	
Winnebago	South Beloit	38.4	61.8	IL 2 north (Blackhawk Boulevard)	Begin/end concurrency with IL 2.
Winnebago	South Beloit	39.3	63.2	US 51 north (Dearborn Avenue) / IL 251 south (North 2nd Street) – Roscoe	Begin/end concurrency with US 51; northern terminus of IL 251.
Winnebago	South Beloit	40.6	65.3	I-39 / I-90 / US 51 south – Chicago, Rockford, Madison	Begin/end concurrency with US 51; exit 1 (I-90).
Winnebago	South Beloit	41.64	67.01	WIS 67 north – Sharon	Eastern terminus of IL 75; Wisconsin state line.
1.000 mi = 1.609 km; 1.000 km = 0.621 mi: Concurrency terminus
