= Ron George Round Barn =

- U.S. National Register of Historic Places
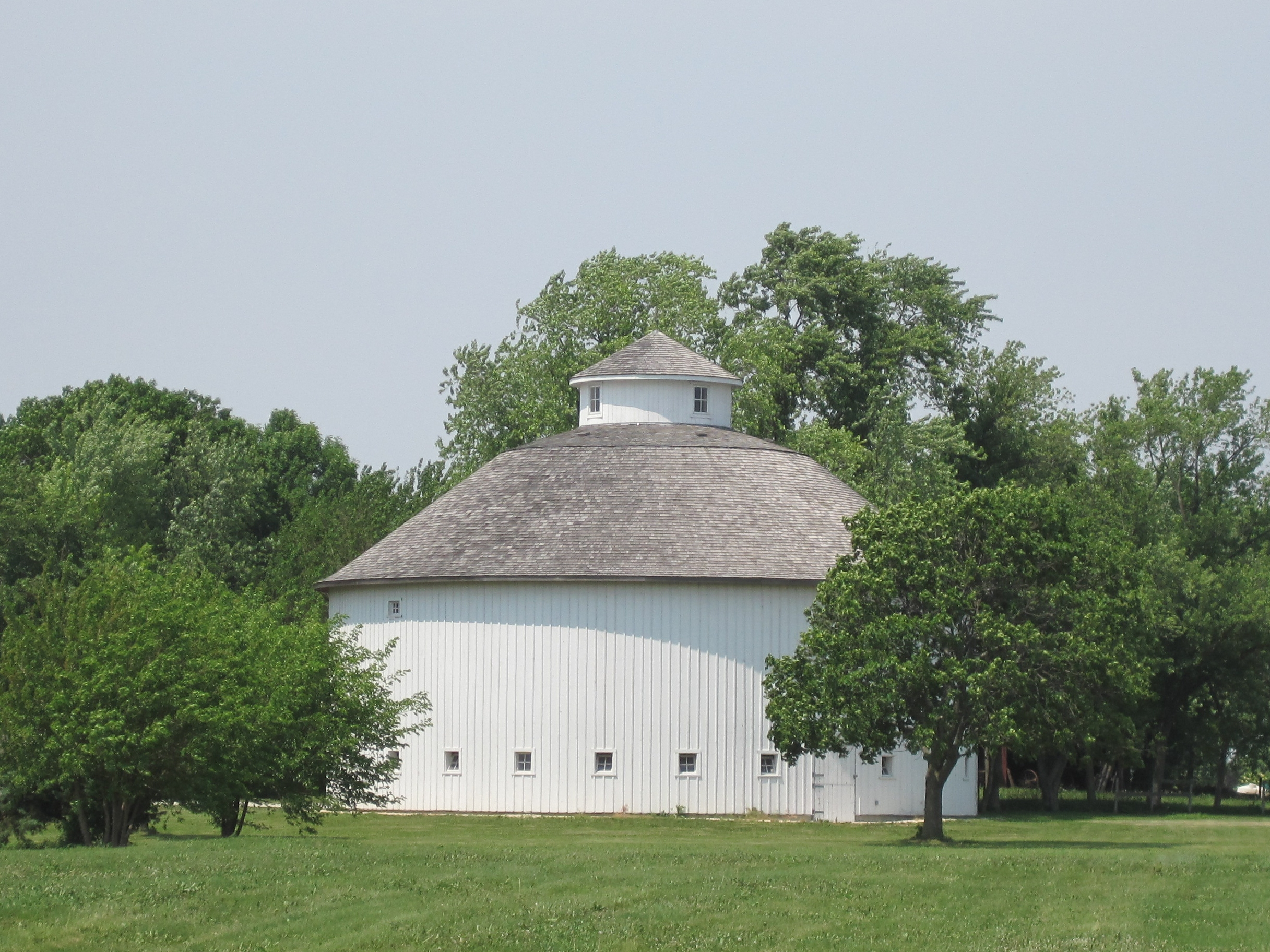
- Ron George Round Barn in 2011

- Location within Illinois Location within the United States
- Location: Will County, Illinois, USA
- Nearest city: Romeoville
- Coordinates: 41°38′26″N 88°6′10″W
- Architectural style: Round barns
- MPS: MPL001 - Round Barns in Illinois Thematic Resources
- NRHP reference No.: 82000401
- Added to NRHP: December 7, 1982

Ron George Round Barn is a round barn northeast of the U.S. village of Romeoville, Illinois. It was originally constructed for Frank Eaton c. 1912–13 in Bolingbrook, Illinois.

== History ==
Wilbur J. Fraser, who designed most of the round barns in Illinois, encouraged his brother-in-law Frank Eaton to construct such a barn. Eaton was living in the nearby settlement of Plainfield at the time. The $1,500 building served nine horse stalls and may have served cows as well. It was named after Eaton's young grandson Ron George. Ownership of the barn was later transferred to George, who maintained the property until the 1970s.

George Round Barn was listed on the National Register of Historic Places by the National Park Service in December 1982, four months after four other round barns joined the Register as part of the Multiple Property Submission (MPS), Round Barns in Illinois. In 1998, in an effort to prevent its demolition, the barn was dismantled and moved elsewhere in Bolingbrook. It was finally reconstructed in 2007.

== Architecture ==
The round barn in 60 feet (18 m) in diameter and sits on a poured concrete foundation. The single-hip roof has wooden shingles. The central silo is elliptical and is accessed from the loft. A wooden cupola is found 60 feet (18 m) above the ground. The main entrance was originally on the northwest side of the barn. The original building materials are still in use. At its original location, the barn abutted two large sheds, one to the east and one from the south. The round design was believed to be more efficient than the typical rectangular barn.
