= James Bruce Round Barn =

- U.S. National Register of Historic Places
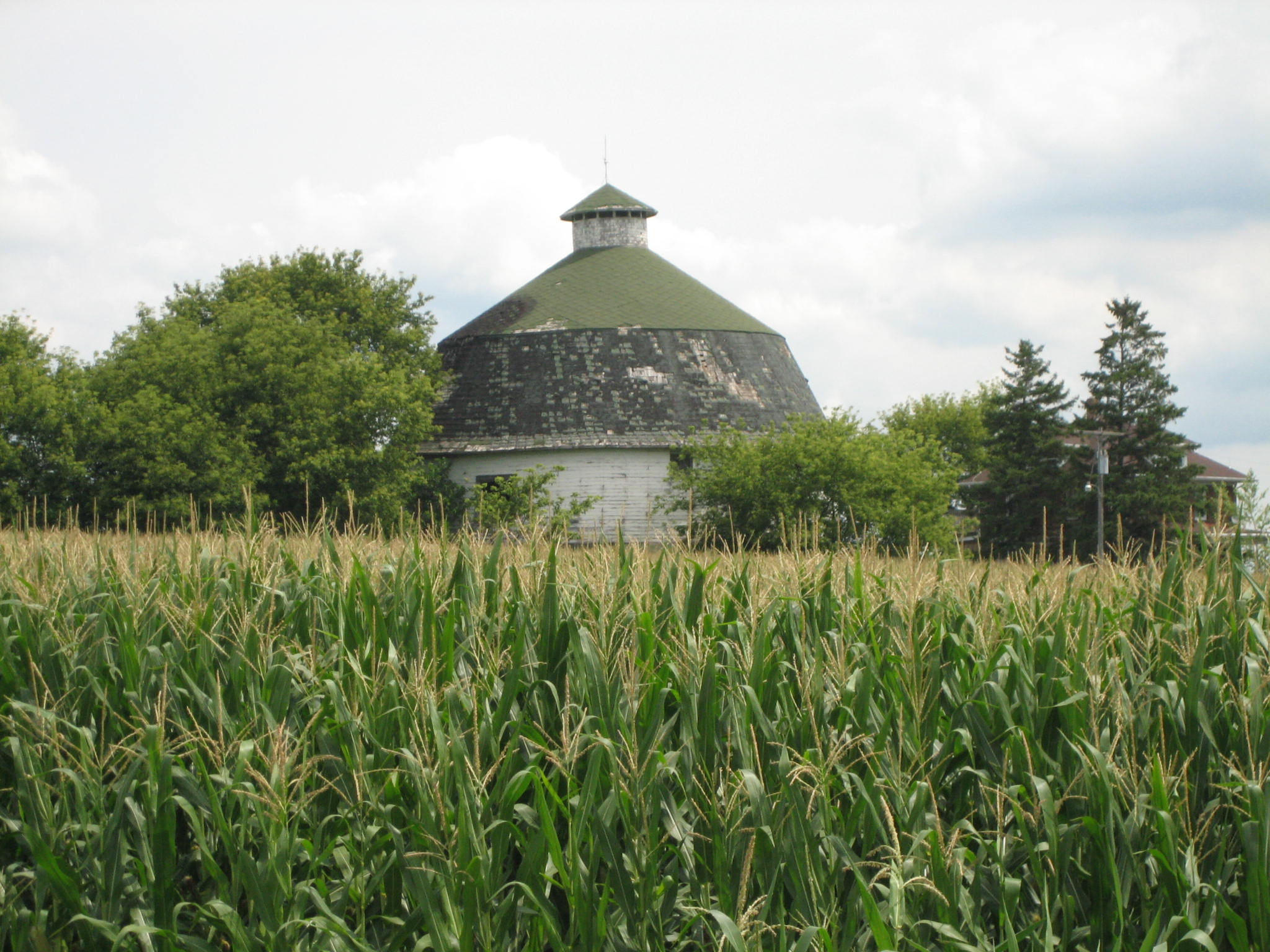

- Location within Illinois Location within the United States
- Location: Florence Township Stephenson County, Illinois
- Nearest city: Freeport
- Coordinates: 42°15′6″N 89°38′55″W
- Area: less than one acre
- Built: 1914
- Architect: Jeremiah Shaffer and the Haas Brothers
- Architectural style: Round barn
- MPS: Round Barns in Illinois TR
- NRHP reference No.: 84001157
- Added to NRHP: February 23, 1984

The James Bruce Round Barn is a round barn located near the Stephenson County, Illinois city of Freeport, United States. The barn was constructed in 1914 by the team of Jeremiah Shaffer and the Haas Brothers, who were responsible for at least a dozen round barns in the area. The barn features a single hip roof design which was probably influenced by the Agricultural Experiment Stations at the University of Illinois and the University of Wisconsin–Madison. The Bruce Round Barn was the last known round barn designed by the Shaffer–Haas team. The building was listed on the U.S. National Register of Historic Places as part of a multiple property submission in 1984.

== History ==
The James Bruce Round Barn is one of 31 round barns found in a four county area that includes Winnebago County, Stephenson County in Illinois, and Rock and Green Counties in Wisconsin. Twenty one of those barns are within Stephenson County. The Bruce Round Barn was constructed in 1914 for James Bruce by Jeremiah Shaffer and the Haas Brothers.

== Design ==
The barn was designed by the team of Jeremiah Shaffer and the Haas Brothers, Shaffer's five brothers-in-law. The Shaffer–Haas team built 12 of 13 round barns in the Stephenson–Winnebago County area that have had their carpentry positively attributed.

The diameter of the James Bruce Round Barn is 58 feet 8 inches (about 17.7 m). Its exterior is clad in wooden siding, known as "drop siding," and it stands on a poured concrete foundation. The single hip roof is supported by a series of braces and topped with a cupola. The stave silo has a diameter of 12 feet (3.7 m) and is accessed on the barn's northeast side via a banked entrance. Animals entered the barn at grade level on the south side of the building. Above the south and northeast entrances are overshoots which extend from the wall diagonally and were meant to compensate for the building's lack of overall storm protection.

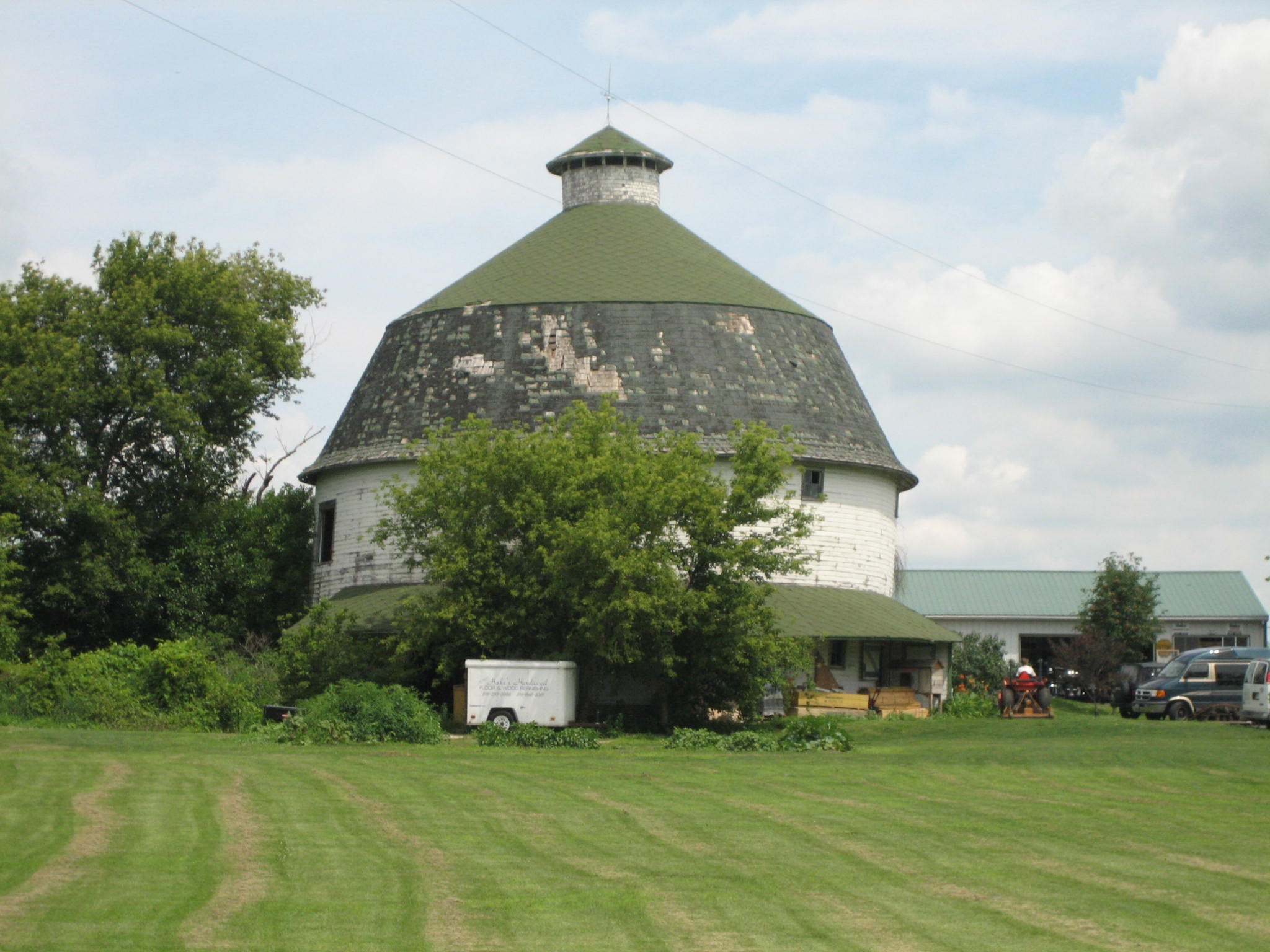
The Bruce Round Barn features a single hip roof and a wooden central silo.

The single hip roof design represents the evolution of round barn construction in northern Illinois and southern Wisconsin. Furthermore, the inclusion of a central wooden silo on the Bruce Barn may represent the cumulative influence from Agricultural Experiment Stations at the University of Illinois at Urbana-Champaign and the University of Wisconsin–Madison. Two of the three round barns designed at the University of Illinois experiment station feature the central silo.

In the days before mechanization, round barns were seen as being useful because of their labor-saving features: the livestock could be fed in one pass around the barn, using the hay stored in the loft above the stock and the grain in the central silo. Cleaning out the manure likewise could be done in one circuit, with fewer wasted steps. The coming of machinery, especially with the Rural Electrification program, obviated labor-saving designs that were more complicated to build, and round barns faded into history.

== Significance ==
The Bruce Round Barn is the last known round barn constructed by the team of Shaffer and the Haas Brothers. The design of the Bruce Barn is important in the evolution of general round barn design. The single hip roof construction, complete with a series of internal rafter braces for extra support are the result of the inability of some carpenters to complete the self-supporting roofs that round barns typically utilized. The Haas Brothers and Shaffer came up with two novel solutions to this problem. The first was to construct a conical roof, the second, which is exemplified in the Bruce Round Barn, was to construct a single hip roof. The University of Illinois Agricultural Experiment Station heavily influenced the roof style.

The James Bruce Round Barn was listed on the U.S. National Register of Historic Places on February 23, 1984. The Bruce Round Barn was part of the original National Register submission that accompanied the development of inclusion criteria for Illinois round barns. These types of specific inclusion criteria are known as multiple property submissions, and they outline basic criteria for National Register inclusion for properties of a certain type and attempt to put them into a historical context. Each property submitted under the auspices of a multiple property submission is listed on the National Register of Historic Places individually.

== See also ==
- Charles Fehr Round Barn
- Dennis Otte Round Barn
- Gerald Harbach Round Barn
- Robert Weber Round Barn
