= Wheeler-Magnus Round Barn =

- U.S. National Register of Historic Places
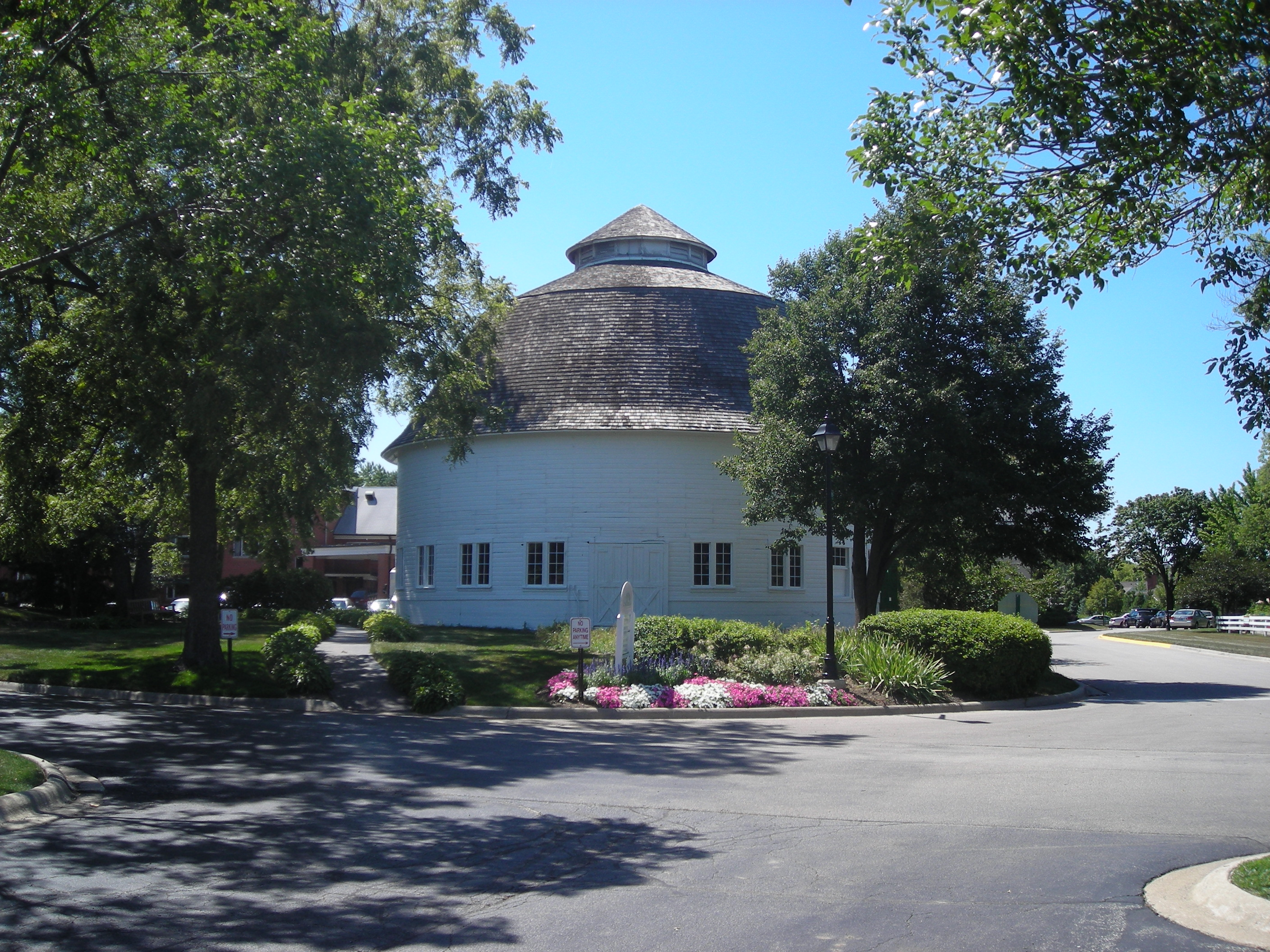

- Location within Illinois Location within the United States
- Location: 811 E. Central Rd., Arlington Heights, Illinois
- Coordinates: 42°5′42″N 87°58′51″W
- Built: c. 1910
- Architectural style: Round barns
- MPS: MPL001 – Round Barns in Illinois Thematic Resources
- NRHP reference No.: 92001017
- Added to NRHP: August 18, 1992

The Wheeler-Magnus Round Barn is located on the grounds of a retirement community in the Cook County village of Arlington Heights in the U.S. state of Illinois. It is a 50 feet (15 m) diameter barn built in approximately 1910.

It was listed on the National Register of Historic Places in 1992 when it joined the Round Barns in Illinois Multiple Property Submission (MPS). It is the only round barn in Cook County listed on the Register.
