= Dennis Otte Round Barn =

- U.S. National Register of Historic Places
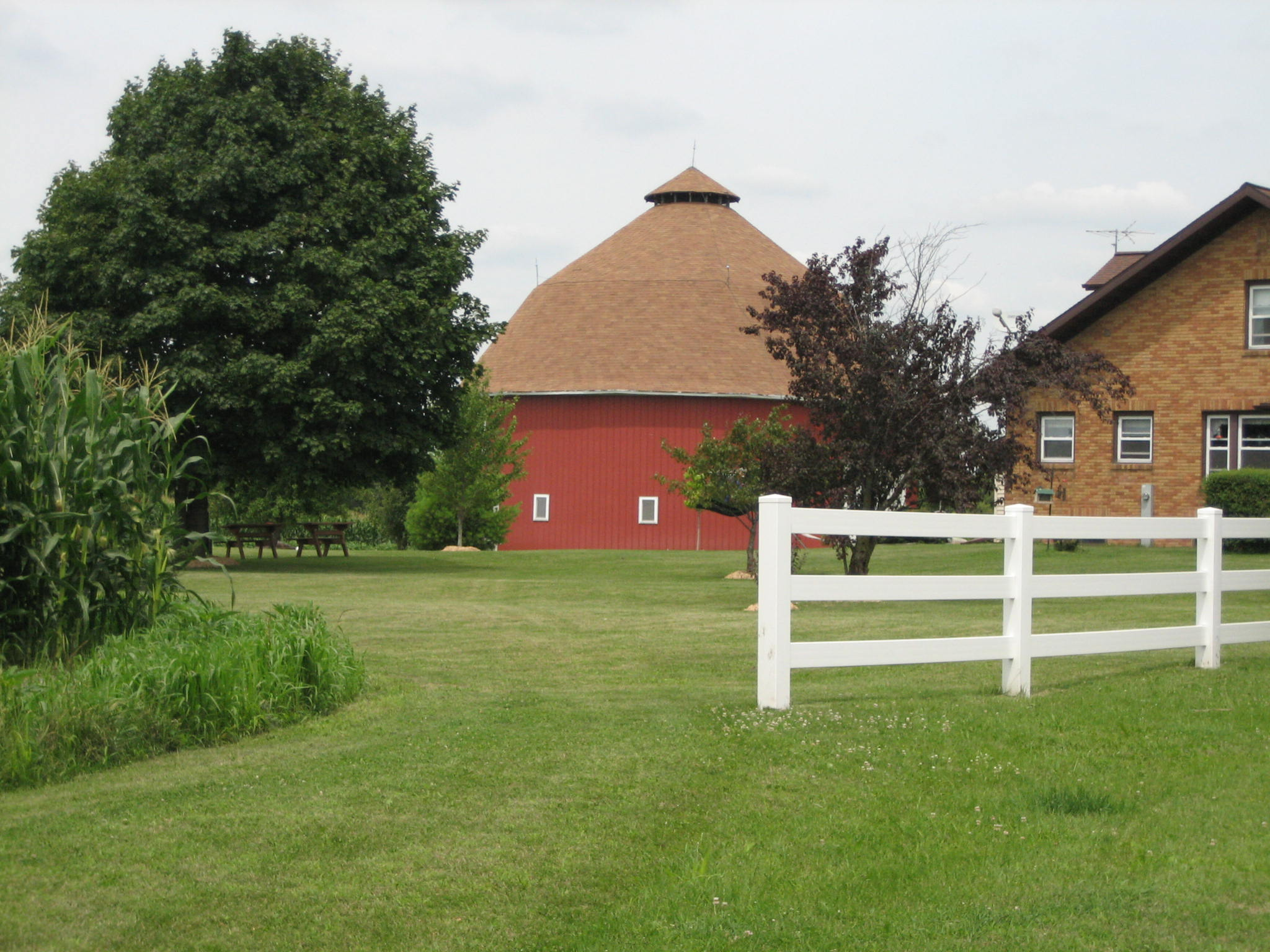

- Location within Illinois Location within the United States
- Location: Eleroy, Stephenson County, Illinois
- Coordinates: 42°19′59″N 89°44′58″W
- Area: less than one acre
- Built: 1930
- Architect: Herman Altenbern
- Architectural style: Round barn
- MPS: Round Barns in Illinois TR
- NRHP reference No.: 84001164
- Added to NRHP: February 23, 1984

The Dennis Otte Round Barn is a round barn in the U.S. state of Illinois near the unincorporated Stephenson County community of Eleroy. The barn was built in 1930 by Herman Altenbern and has a diameter of 54 feet (16.5 m). The barn is representative of the last round barn design variations that evolved. The Otte Round Barn was added to the U.S. National Register of Historic Places in 1984.

== History ==
The Dennis Otte Round Barn was built in 1930 by Herman Altenbern for Carl Richards near the community of Eleroy in Stephenson County, Illinois, United States. Richards' father had a round barn previously erected.

== Architecture ==
The Dennis Otte Round Barn is 54 feet (16.5 m) in diameter and stands upon a poured concrete foundation. The barn's main entrance is found in its east quadrant, where it faces due east. The door opens into a central crib which bisects the building. Animal stalls are arranged on either side of the crib in a semi circular pattern, they are divided with hewn and sawed posts which support a concentric loft plate with a radius of about 27 feet (8.2 m). The single hip roof is supported by a 2 by 6 inch (5.1 by 15.2 cm) beam nailed to each rafter four feet (1.2 m) above, and four feet (1.2 m) below on the opposite side, the roof hip. This is similar to the nearby Gerald Harbach Round Barn. The wooden shingled roof is capped by a short, squat cupola. The loft plate, the flooring and the loft piers were all constructed from previously used materials.

== Significance ==
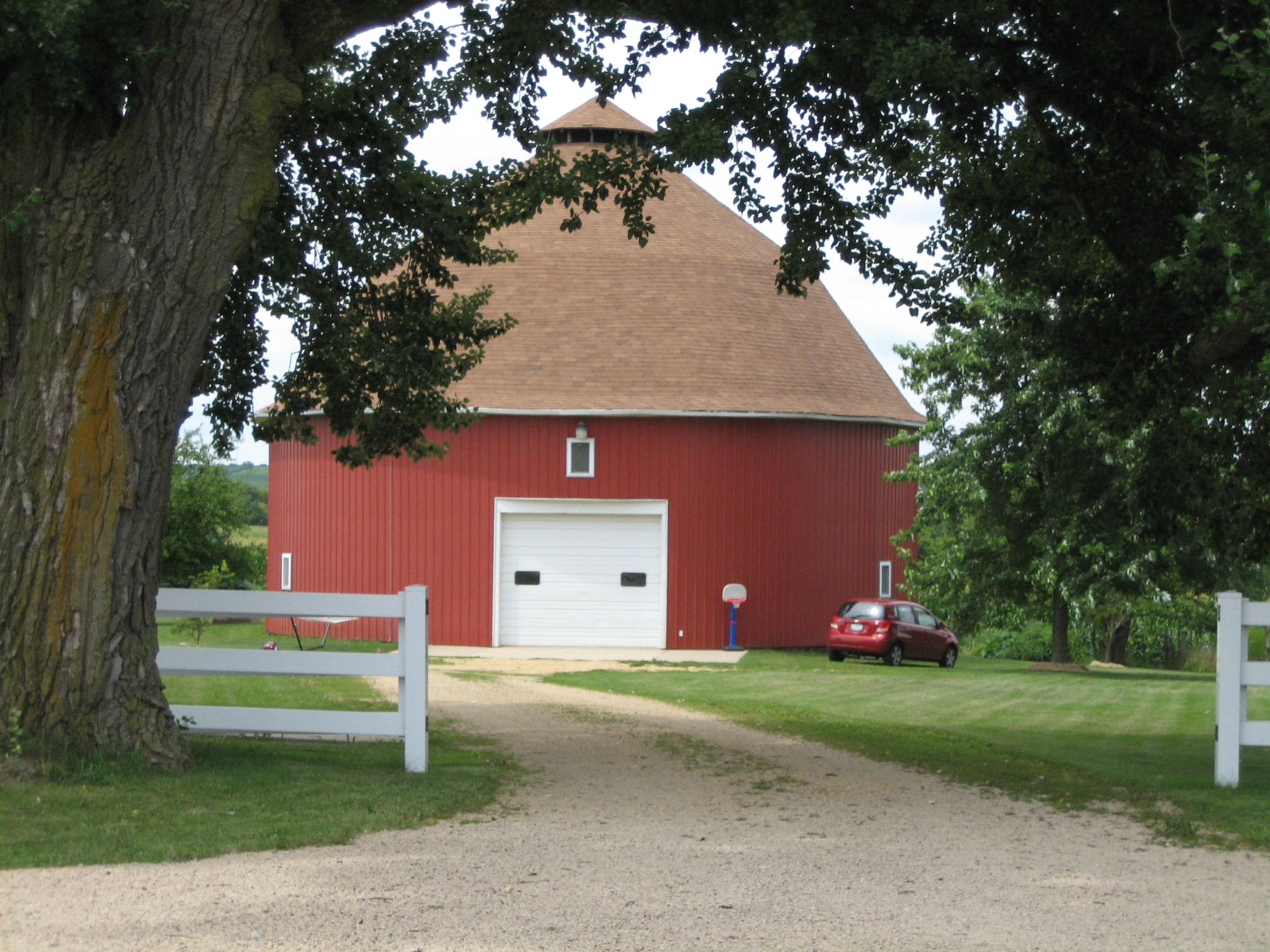
The Otte Round Barn's main entrance faces due east.

The Dennis Otte Round Barn is one of 31 round barns that were constructed in a four county area, the Stephenson County area, that includes Winnebago County, Stephenson County and Rock and Green Counties in Wisconsin. Twenty one of those barns, including the Otte Round Barn are within Stephenson County.

While the design of the Otte Round Barn is consistent with the designs found during the second phase of Stephenson County, Illinois round barn construction it does have key differences which set it apart from other similar barns. Similarities are found in the single hip roof, the squat cupola and the special rafter bracing technique. The use of salvaged materials reflects the Depression era economy during which the Otte Round Barn was constructed. These characteristic reflect the last design variation found in Stephenson County round barns. The Otte Round Barn was added to the U.S. National Register of Historic Places on February 23, 1984 as part of a Multiple Property Submission.

== See also ==
- Charles Fehr Round Barn
- Gerald Harbach Round Barn
- James Bruce Round Barn
- Robert Weber Round Barn
