= Illinois Route 2 =

State highway in northern Illinois, US

Illinois Route 2
- IL 2 highlighted in red

Route information
- Maintained by IDOT
- Length: 73.91 mi (118.95 km)
- Existed: November 5, 1918–present

Major junctions
- South end: IL 40 in Sterling
- US 52 / IL 26 in Dixon; IL 64 in Oregon; IL 72 in Byron; US 20 in Rockford; IL 75 in South Beloit
- North end: WIS 213 at South Beloit

Location
- Country: United States
- State: Illinois
- Counties: Whiteside, Lee, Ogle, Winnebago

Highway system
- Illinois State Highway System; Interstate; US; State; Tollways; Scenic
← IL 1	→ IL 3

Illinois Route 2 (IL 2) is a north–south state highway in northern Illinois. It currently starts at Illinois Route 40 in Sterling and ends at the Wisconsin state line in South Beloit, very near the intersection with U.S. Route 51, Illinois Route 75 and Illinois Route 251. Illinois 2 is 73.91 miles (118.95 km) long.

== Route description ==
Illinois 2 used to follow the Rock River from Rock Island to South Beloit. It was used in the 19th century as a primary trading route from Rockford to Rock Island, The Rock River was not used as a trading route for boats as it is only navigable west of Rock Falls.

Illinois 2 has since been superseded by Interstate 39 and Interstate 88 for most ground transportation, but the original route remains.

In Sterling, IL 2 begins as a one-way pair. Near the Sinnissippi Mounds, the two one-way roads merge into a two-way road. From Sterling to Dixon, IL 2 largely follows a portion of Lincoln Highway but with one exception. Lincoln Highway branches off northeast to Palmyra and then back southeast to IL 2 just northwest of Dixon. Just north of Dixon, both routes run concurrently with US 52 and IL 26. They then cross the Rock River to get to downtown. In downtown, IL 2 branches off northeast from the other two routes.

At Grand Detour, IL 2 transitions from following the south/east bank of Rock River to the north/west bank via a bridge. Further north, it passes through Castle Rock State Park, IL 64 at the Ogle County Courthouse in Oregon, and IL 72 in Byron (runs concurrently with IL 2). North of the Chicago Rockford International Airport, IL 2 turns north. At this point, it largely parallels IL 251 for the rest of the route which is east of the river. It then meets US 20 at a diamond interchange (formerly a cloverleaf interchange).

As IL 2 gets closer to downtown Rockford, another split occurs. Northbound traffic continues on Main Street, then east on Chestnut Street (US 20 Business), then north on Wyman Street, then west on Park Avenue near the site of Beattie Park Mound Group, and then back north on Main Street before merging. Southbound traffic has to turn west onto John Street, then south on Church Street, and then east on Cedar Street before merging.

In Rockton, IL 2 transitions from the west side of the river to the east side again. Further north, IL 75 runs concurrently with IL 2 from Rockton to South Beloit. One third of a mile from the Wisconsin state line, IL 75 leaves this concurrency to travel East while IL 2 continues North over a railroad grade crossing and Turtle Creek before reaching its Northern terminus at a junction with WIS 213.

== History ==
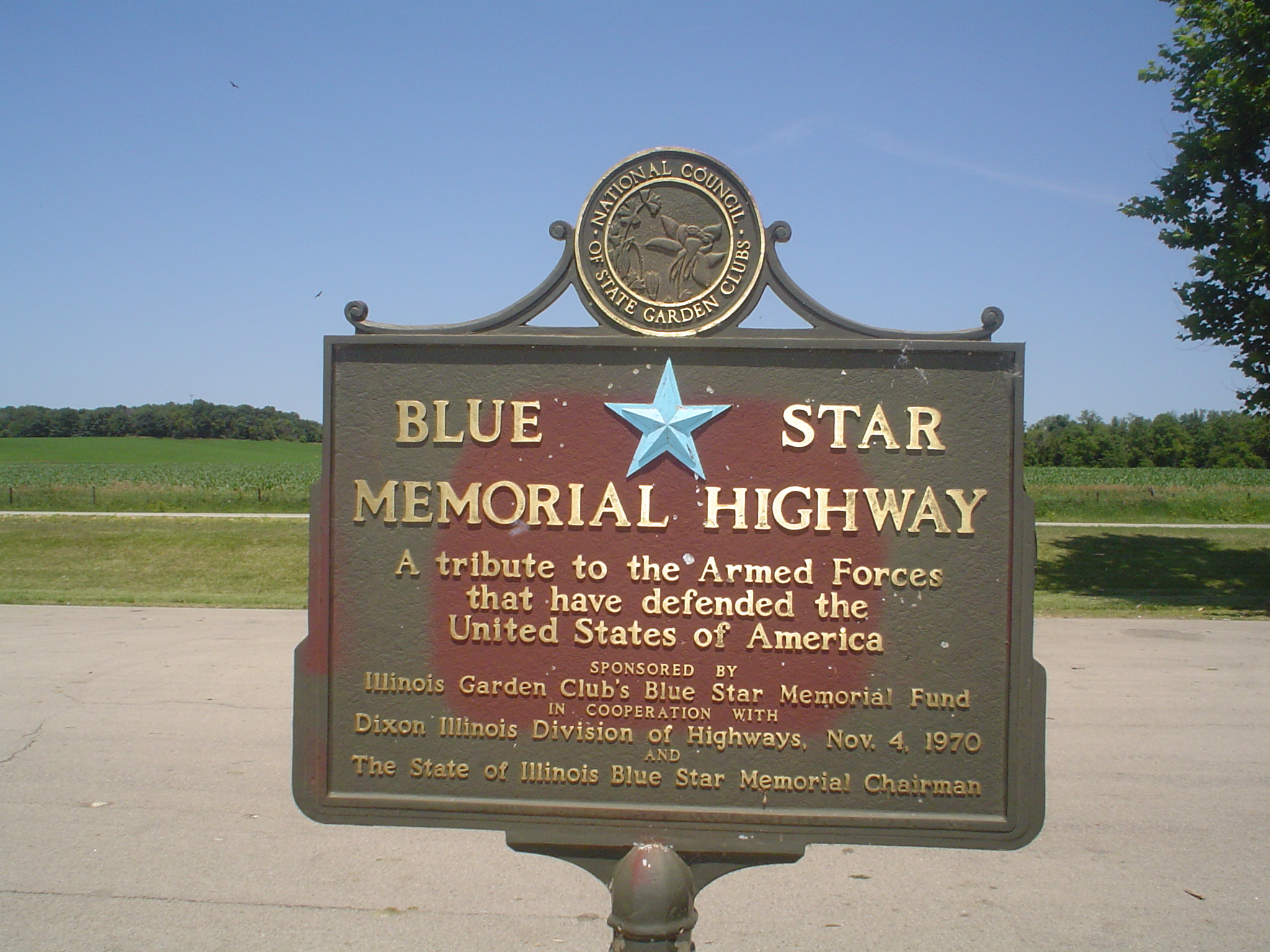
Sign located in Ogle County

SBI Route 2 originally ran from South Beloit to Cairo. It followed a part of current IL 2 from South Beloit to Dixon. It then followed south on (roughly) present-day US 52, IL 251, and US 51. In 1935, US 51 supplanted IL 2 south of Mendota. With the appearance of US 52 in 1936, IL 2 was removed south of Dixon. Then, in 1938, IL 2 was briefly extended to Muscatine, Iowa, replacing IL 84 and IL 86 in the process. It soon got cut back to Rock Island in 1939 after IL 92 was extended to Muscatine. By 1979, IL 2 was removed west of Sterling as Illinois Route 5 (now I-88 east of I-80) was extended to Rock Island. To this day, exit 2 on I-88 is designated as "Old IL 2", referencing the pre-1979 routing of IL 2.

IL 2 was designated a Blue Star Memorial Highway on November 4, 1970. The sign can be found in a wayside just west of the Winnebago County line in Ogle County along the Rock River.

== Major intersections ==
County	Location	mi	km	Destinations	Notes
Whiteside	Sterling	0.0	0.0	IL 40 south (Locust Street) to I-88 / US 30 – Peoria, Moline, Dekalb	
Whiteside	Sterling			IL 40 north / Lincoln Highway west (1st Avenue) – Mt. Carroll	South end of Lincoln Highway overlap
Whiteside	Sterling			Freeport Road - Polo	State maintained (outside Sterling)
Whiteside	Sterling			Lincoln Highway east (Prairieville-Palmyra Road) – Prairieville, Gap Grove	North end of Lincoln Highway overlap; state maintained
Lee	Dixon			Lincoln Highway west (Palmyra Road) – Gap Grove, Prairieville	South end of Lincoln Highway overlap; state maintained
Lee	Dixon	12.3	19.8	US 52 west / IL 26 north (Galena Avenue) – Savanna, Freeport	South end of US 52 / IL 26 overlap
Lee	Dixon	12.7	20.4	US 52 east / IL 26 south / Lincoln Highway east (Galena Avenue) – Mendota, Princeton	North end of US 52 / IL 26 / Lincoln Highway overlap
Ogle	Oregon	28.6	46.0	IL 64 (Washington Street) – Mt. Carroll, Sycamore	
Ogle	Oregon	31.5	50.7	CR 31 west (Mud Creek Road)	
Ogle	Byron	37.9	61.0	IL 72 west – Leaf River, Forreston	South end of IL 72 overlap
Ogle	Byron	39.2	63.1	IL 72 east (Union Street) – Genoa	North end of IL 72 overlap
Ogle	Byron	41.6	66.9	CR 34 north (Kennedy Hill Road)	
Ogle–Winnebago county line	Rockford	45.9	73.9	CR 24 north (Meridian Road)	
Winnebago	Rockford	50.6	81.4	US 20 to I-39 / I-90 Toll – Freeport, Belvidere	Interchange
Winnebago	Rockford	51.9	83.5	CR 41 north (Harrison Avenue, Springfield Avenue)	
Winnebago	Rockford			US 20 Bus. east (Chestnut Street) to I-90 – Belvidere	One-block overlap with US 20 Bus. east, northbound only
Winnebago	Rockford			US 20 Bus. west (Jefferson Street) – Freeport	
Winnebago	Rockford	59.3	95.4	CR 66 west (Elmwood Road)	
Winnebago	Rockford	59.5	95.8	CR 25 east (Bauer Parkway)	
Winnebago	Rockford	61.8	99.5	CR 17 (Latham Road)	
Winnebago	Rockford	63.9	102.8	CR 71 (Gleasman Road)	
Winnebago	Rockton	64.9	104.4	CR 63 (Roscoe Road)	
Winnebago	Rockton	69.1	111.2	IL 75 west (Blackhawk Boulevard) – Freeport	South end of IL 75 overlap
Winnebago	South Beloit	69.5	111.8	CR 76 (Prairie Hill Road)	
Winnebago	South Beloit	71.4	114.9	IL 75 east (Gardner Street) to I-39 / I-90 / US 51	North end of IL 75 overlap
Winnebago	South Beloit	71.6	115.2	WIS 213 north – Beloit	Wisconsin state line
1.000 mi = 1.609 km; 1.000 km = 0.621 mi: Concurrency terminus
