= Ryan Round Barn =

- U.S. National Register of Historic Places
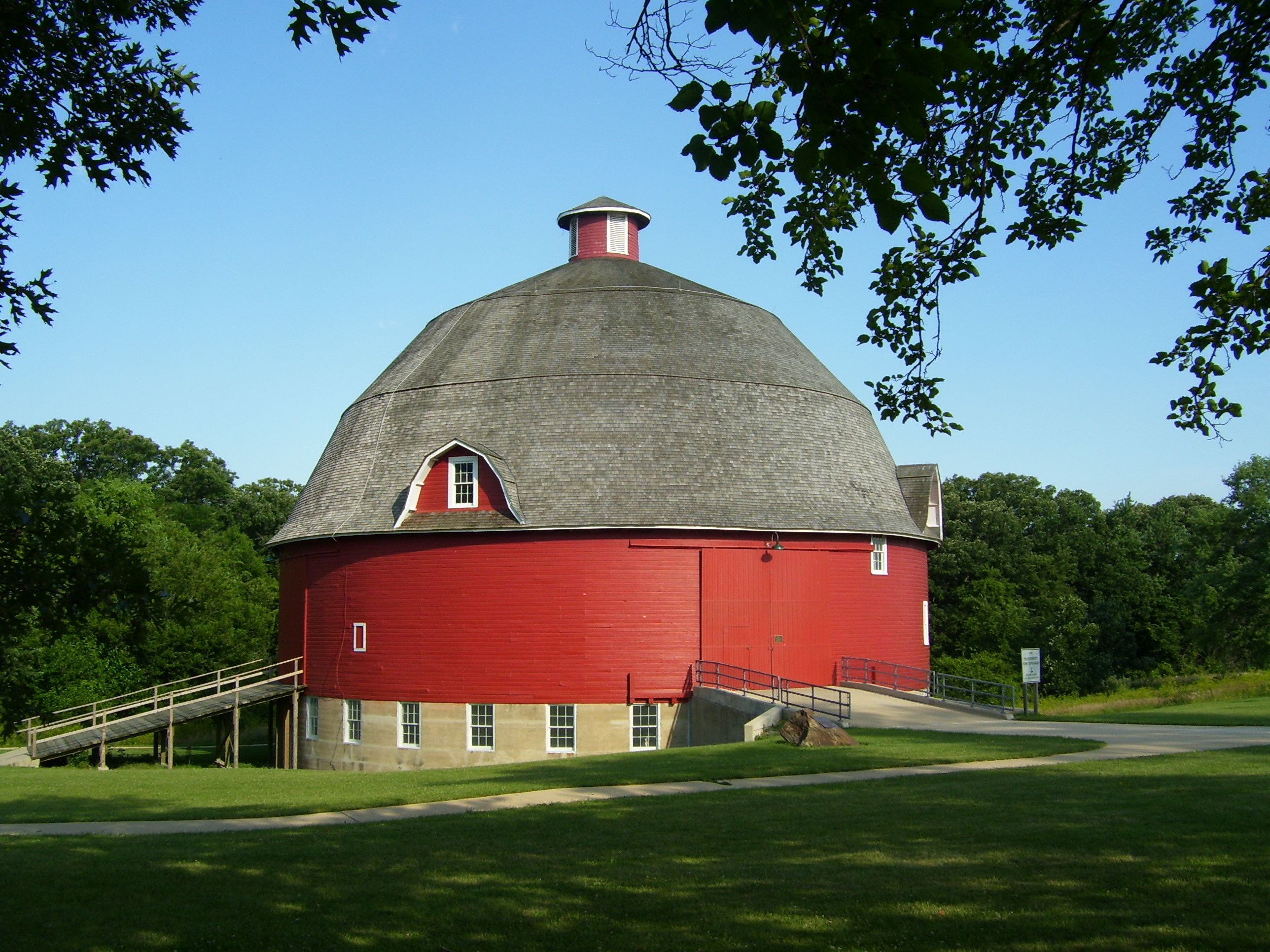

- Location within Illinois Location within the United States
- Location: Henry County, Illinois, USA
- Nearest city: Kewanee
- Coordinates: 41°14′28″N 89°55′32″W
- Built: 1910
- Architectural style: Round barns
- NRHP reference No.: 74000762
- Added to NRHP: December 31, 1974

The Ryan Round Barn is a historic round barn located about six miles north of the city of Kewanee, Illinois in Johnson-Sauk Trail State Park.

== History ==
The Ryan Round Barn was built for Laurence Ryan and completed in 1910 by German immigrant named Feurst. Ryan was a well-known brain surgeon in Chicago who was from Kewanee. He attended medical school at Loyola University and trained in Berlin and Vienna, later becoming the dean of the Medical School at Loyola. In 1908, he purchased 320 acres of land for a retreat from Chicago and the medical world and to explore his hobby of raising Black Angus cattle. The barn was intended to be where the cattle housed, fed and groomed under one roof. After Ryan's death in 1939, the barn was sold to E. A. Johnson of Annawan until it was sold to the state in 1967.

The barn was added to the National Register of Historic Places on December 31, 1974; it was the first round barn in the state to be added to the Register. In 1984, the Friends of Johnson Park Foundation was founded for the express purpose of saving the Round Barn. Currently, the barn features a display of antique farm machinery and implements, and is open to visitors seasonally.

== Design ==
The barn is 61 feet (19 m) tall and 74 feet (23 m) in diameter, making it the largest round barn in Illinois. The interior of the barn has three and a half levels and a central silo. The roof features four gambrel dormers spaced evenly around the edge and a cupola at the top. The side board are constructed horizontally to form continuous circles.

== See also ==
- Round barns in Illinois
- List of round barns#Illinois
