= Carrie Ashton Johnson =

American suffragist, editor, and author

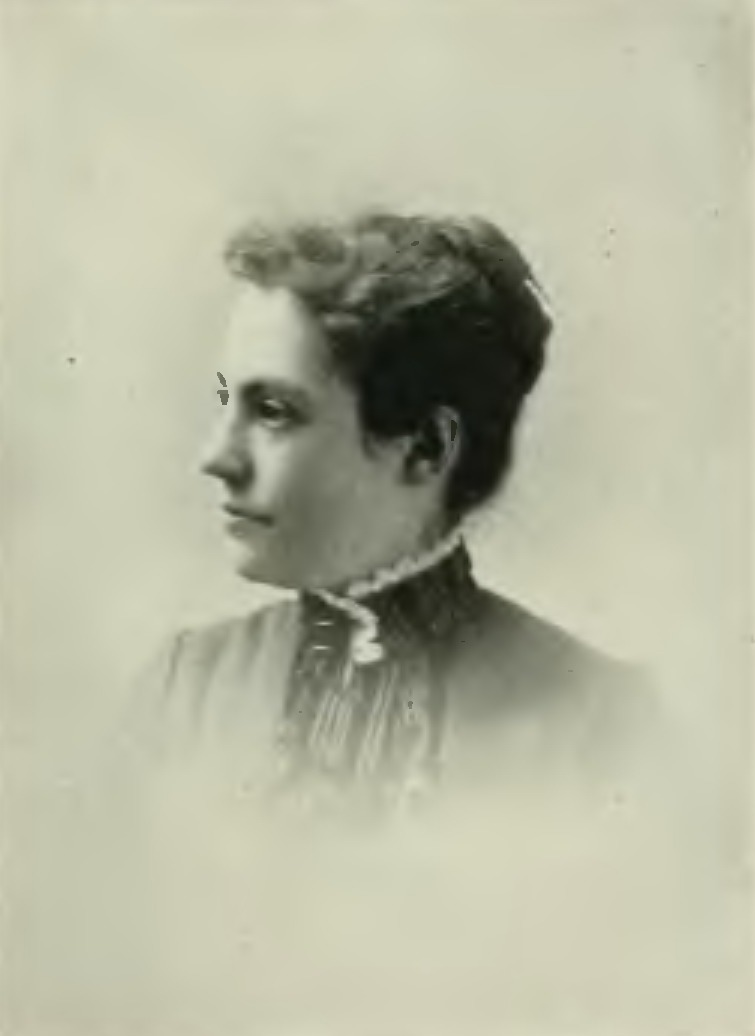
- Photo in A Woman of the Century
- Born: Carrie May Ashton; August 24, 1863 Durand, Illinois, U.S.
- Died: March 3, 1949 (aged 85) Rockford, Illinois, U.S.
- Resting place: Willwood Burial Park, Rockford, Illinois
- Occupation: suffragist; editor; author
- Language: English
- Subject: suffrage and temperance movements
- Spouse: Harry Melancthon Johnson (m. 1889; died 1928)

Carrie Ashton Johnson (née, Ashton; August 24, 1863 – March 3, 1949) was an American suffragist, editor, and author. Through her writing, she was involved in the suffrage and temperance movements of the day. Johnson was affiliated with the Illinois Woman's Press Association for five decades. She was also a co-founder of the Children's Home of Rockford, Illinois.

== Early life and education ==
Carrie May Ashton was born in Durand, Illinois, August 24, 1863. Her parents were Andrew, a dry goods merchant, and Mary A. Ashton. She had a sister, Bertha, and a brother, Willard.

When she was fifteen years old, her parents moved to Rockford, where she attended the high school and private schools for several years. Then she took a course in the business college and was graduated there.

== Career ==
"Do I want full franchise? Most assuredly, yes. Why do I want it?
First — Because I believe it is right and just for women to have it.
Second — Because woman's influence is needed to purify the body politic.
Third — When women have a voice in making the law, we will have better and more just laws on the statute books.
Fourth – When women are given the ballot, there will be equal pay for equal work."
–C. A. Johnson, 1895

She was an active member of the Young Woman's Christian Temperance Union (WCTU) and of the Equal Suffrage Association. She served as State secretary of the Illinois Equal Suffrage Association in the early 1890s. In 1889, she published Glimpses of Sunshine, a volume of sketches and quotations on suffrage work and workers. She was a contributor to the Cottage Hearth, the Housewife, Table Talk, the Ladies' Home Companion, the Household, the Housekeeper, the Modern Priscilla, Godey's Magazine, Home Magazine, the Decorator and Furnisher, Interior Decorator, and other journals. She wrote mainly on domestic topics, interior decorations, suffrage and temperance subjects.

For more than three years, Johnson was in charge of the woman's department of the Farmer's Voice, of Chicago, called "The Bureau for Better Halves," and afterwards conducted a like page for the Spectator, a family magazine published in Rockford. After Harry's death, January 19, 1928, the widow and her sons, Willard Ashton Johnson and Donald B. Johnson, held ownership of the Republican, until 1928, when they sold it to Ruth Hanna McCormick. In 1940, she was honored for her fifty-year membership in the Illinois Woman's Press Association.

== Personal life ==
On November 27, 1889, she married Harry Melancthon Johnson, managing editor of the Rockford Morning Star. The Johnsons made their home in Rockford. She died in Rockford, March 3, 1949. Interment was at Willwood Burial Park, Rockford. He went on to become the owner of the Rockford Republican.
