= Erin Township, Illinois =

Erin Township
- Township
- Location in Stephenson County
- Coordinates: 42°19′59″N 89°46′37″W
- Country: United States
- State: Illinois
- County: Stephenson

Government
  - Supervisor: Brian Diddens

Area
  - Total: 18.15 sq mi (47.0 km^{2})
  - Land: 18.15 sq mi (47.0 km^{2})
  - Water: 0 sq mi (0 km^{2}) 0%
- Elevation: 1,017 ft (310 m)

Population (2010)
  - Estimate (2016): 396
  - Density: 22.6/sq mi (8.7/km^{2})
- Time zone: UTC-6 (CST)
  - Summer (DST): UTC-5 (CDT)
- FIPS code: 17-177-24413

Erin Township is located in Stephenson County, Illinois. As of the 2010 census, its population was 410 and it contained 177 housing units. The unincorporated community of Eleroy is located in the township.

== Geography ==
Erin is Township 27 North, Range 6 (part) East of the Fourth Principal Meridian.

According to the 2010 census, the township has a total area of 18.15 square miles (47.0 km^{2}), all land.

=== Stagecoach inns ===
The Stage Inn (Section 14) was built along the Old State Road number 2, now U.S. Route 20, ½ mile east of Eleroy. The stone inn was a stop for the Frink, Walker & Company stage line that operated from Chicago to Galena 1839–1854. A stone barn across the road from the inn was demolished.

== Demographics ==
Historical population
Census	Pop.	Note	%±
2016 (est.)	396
U.S. Decennial Census
