= Charles Fehr Round Barn =

- U.S. National Register of Historic Places
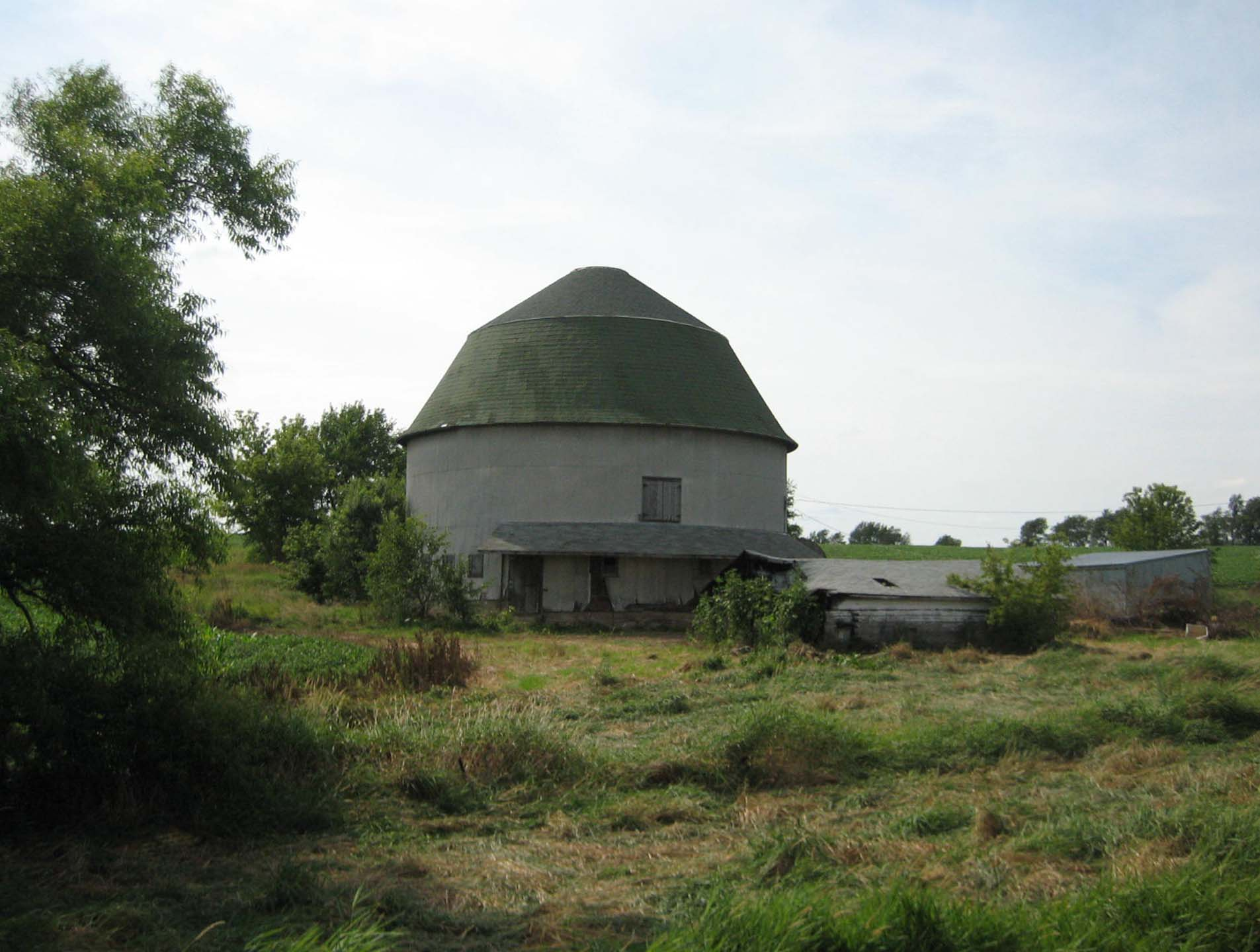

- Location within Illinois Location within the United States
- Nearest city: Orangeville, Illinois
- Coordinates: 42°29′34″N 89°31′20″W
- Area: less than one acre
- Built: 1912
- Architect: Jeremiah Shaffer and the Haas Brothers
- Architectural style: Round barn
- MPS: Round Barns in Illinois TR
- NRHP reference No.: 84001152
- Added to NRHP: February 23, 1984

The Charles Fehr Round Barn is a round barn in the U.S. state of Illinois near the Stephenson County village of Orangeville. The barn was built in 1912 by the team of Jeremiah Shaffer and the Haas Brothers about one half mile from the Illinois–Wisconsin state border. The building is the first round barn in the Stephenson County area, home to 31 round barns, with a hip roof. The building was added to the U.S. National Register of Historic Places in 1984.

== History ==
The Charles Fehr Round Barn was built in 1912 for Walter Knott. The building stands on a concrete foundation near the Stephenson County village of Orangeville, about one half mile from the Illinois–Wisconsin state border.

== Architecture ==
The original design of the 56 foot (17.1 m) diameter round barn included a rooftop cupola as well as a silo on the barn's southeast quadrant. Both of these features are no longer extant, the barn is otherwise in unaltered condition. The structure was built and designed by the team of Jeremiah Shaffer and the Haas Brothers. The loft is supported by a central concrete shaft, at its apex joists radiate outward from it. Access to the loft is obtained through an earthen ramp on the building's west side and the animal entrance is found on the barn's southeast side. Both entrances are covered by an overhang. The single hip roof is braced on its interior by a 2 by 6 inch (5.1 by 15.2 cm) beam nailed to each rafter four feet (1.2 m) above, and four feet (1.2 m) below on the opposite side, the roof hip. The exterior wooden roof is covered with asphalt shingles and the barn's original siding has been covered with sheet metal.

== Significance ==
The Charles Fehr Round Barn is one of 31 round barns that were constructed in a four county area, the Stephenson County area, that includes Winnebago and Stephenson Counties as well as Rock and Green Counties in Wisconsin. Twenty one of those barns, including the Fehr Round Barn are within Stephenson County.

The Fehr Round Barn illustrates the evolution of round barn design, especially in the Stephenson County area. The barn was the first in the area to be built with a hip roof. This roof style set the structure's design apart from the typical round barn designed based on recommendations from the University of Illinois' and the University of Wisconsin–Madison's Agricultural Experiment Stations. The building represents the ability of local builders and designers to create their own ideas without the station's influence. The Fehr Round Barn was added to the U.S. National Register of Historic Places on February 23, 1984 as part of a Multiple Property Submission.

== See also ==
- Dennis Otte Round Barn
- Gerald Harbach Round Barn
- James Bruce Round Barn
- Robert Weber Round Barn
