= Harrison Township, Illinois =

Harrison Township
- Township
- Location in Winnebago County
- Coordinates: 42°24′35″N 89°13′52″W
- Country: United States
- State: Illinois
- County: Winnebago
- Established: November 6, 1849

Government
  - Supervisor: Steven Wilke

Area
  - Total: 24.73 sq mi (64.1 km^{2})
  - Land: 24.61 sq mi (63.7 km^{2})
  - Water: 0.12 sq mi (0.31 km^{2}) 0.49%
- Elevation: 794 ft (242 m)

Population (2010)
  - Estimate (2016): 651
  - Density: 27.2/sq mi (10.5/km^{2})
- Time zone: UTC-6 (CST)
  - Summer (DST): UTC-5 (CDT)
- FIPS code: 17-201-33188

Harrison Township is located in Winnebago County, Illinois. As of the 2010 census, its population was 670 and it contained 273 housing units.

== Geography ==
According to the 2010 census, the township has a total area of 24.73 square miles (64.1 km^{2}), of which 24.61 square miles (63.7 km^{2}) (or 99.51%) is land and 0.12 square miles (0.31 km^{2}) (or 0.49%) is water.

== Demographics ==
Historical population
Census	Pop.	Note	%±
2016 (est.)	651
U.S. Decennial Census
