= Durand, Illinois =

Durand
- Village
- Village of Durand
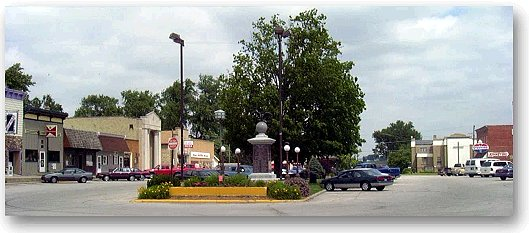
- Downtown Durand
- Nickname: Village of Volunteers
- Location of Durand in Winnebago County, Illinois.
- Coordinates: 42°26′02″N 89°19′36″W
- Country: United States
- State: Illinois
- County: Winnebago
- Township: Durand

Government
  - Mayor: Shiela Hoffman

Area
  - Total: 0.92 sq mi (2.38 km^{2})
  - Land: 0.92 sq mi (2.38 km^{2})
  - Water: 0 sq mi (0.00 km^{2})
- Elevation: 774 ft (236 m)

Population (2020)
  - Total: 1,390
  - Density: 1,512.6/sq mi (584.02/km^{2})
- Time zone: UTC-6 (CST)
  - Summer (DST): UTC-5 (CDT)
- ZIP code: 61024
- Area code: 815
- FIPS code: 17-21280
- GNIS ID: 2398762
- Website: villageofdurand.com

Durand is a village in Winnebago County, Illinois, United States. It is part of the Rockford, Illinois Metropolitan Statistical Area The population was 1,390 at the 2020 census.

== History ==
Its township's beginnings initiated originally in a no longer existing settlement called Elton, an area South of Durand and including parts of the Pecatonica and Rock Run townships and settled in 1835 by Nelson Salisbury, Harvey Lower, and Scott Robb. They and nine other families settled the Southwest portion of modern Durand, Pecatonica, and Rock Run area. Durand gave birth to Illinois' first tax-supported volunteer fire department. Since its settlement, Durand has been prone to devastating fires. Durand's early flourishings were closely linked to the development of the Racine-Mississippi Railroad later absorbed into Western Union. The line reached Durand in 1857, en route to Freeport, paving the shift from the Elton community into modern Durand and deriving its name from the railroad's first president, H.S. Durand. At this time, Durand saw the beginning of its prosperity which entailed the demise of the Elton settlement.

== Geography ==
Durand is located 14 miles by road north of US Route 20 on Illinois Route 70. Illinois Route 75 also runs south of town.

According to the 2010 census, Durand has a total area of 0.94 square miles (2.43 km^{2}), all land.

== Demographics ==
Historical population
Census	Pop.	Note	%±
1880	530		—
1890	489		−7.7%
1900	571		16.8%
1910	527		−7.7%
1920	549		4.2%
1930	554		0.9%
1940	592		6.9%
1950	679		14.7%
1960	797		17.4%
1970	972		22.0%
1980	1,073		10.4%
1990	1,100		2.5%
2000	1,081		−1.7%
2010	1,443		33.5%
2020	1,390		−3.7%
U.S. Decennial Census

=== 2020 census ===
As of the 2020 census, Durand had a population of 1,390. The median age was 42.3 years. 23.8% of residents were under the age of 18 and 21.2% of residents were 65 years of age or older. For every 100 females, there were 98.9 males, and for every 100 females age 18 and over, there were 93.2 males age 18 and over.

0.0% of residents lived in urban areas, while 100.0% lived in rural areas.

There were 562 households in Durand, of which 31.9% had children under the age of 18 living in them. Of all households, 45.9% were married-couple households, 19.0% were households with a male householder and no spouse or partner present, and 27.6% were households with a female householder and no spouse or partner present. About 32.2% of all households were made up of individuals, and 15.3% had someone living alone who was 65 years of age or older.

There were 588 housing units, of which 4.4% were vacant. The homeowner vacancy rate was 0.0% and the rental vacancy rate was 6.0%.

Racial composition as of the 2020 census
Race	Number	Percent
White	1,306	94.0%
Black or African American	9	0.6%
American Indian and Alaska Native	3	0.2%
Asian	4	0.3%
Native Hawaiian and Other Pacific Islander	0	0.0%
Some other race	19	1.4%
Two or more races	49	3.5%
Hispanic or Latino (of any race)	40	2.9%

=== 2000 census ===
As of the census of 2000, there were 1,081 people, 441 households, and 288 families residing in the village. The population density was 1,200.9 inhabitants per square mile (463.7/km^{2}). There were 468 housing units at an average density of 519.9 per square mile (200.7/km^{2}). The racial makeup of the village was 97.22% White, 0.56% African American, 0.28% Native American, 0.09% Pacific Islander, 0.65% from other races, and 1.20% from two or more races. Hispanic or Latino of any race were 1.02% of the population.

There were 441 households, out of which 34.9% had children under the age of 18 living with them, 53.1% were married couples living together, 9.5% had a female householder with no husband present, and 34.5% were non-families. 32.2% of all households were made up of individuals, and 15.6% had someone living alone who was 65 years of age or older. The average household size was 2.45 and the average family size was 3.10.

In the village, the population was spread out, with 28.9% under the age of 18, 6.9% from 18 to 24, 28.8% from 25 to 44, 21.8% from 45 to 64, and 13.6% who were 65 years of age or older. The median age was 36 years. For every 100 females, there were 92.0 males. For every 100 females age 18 and over, there were 86.7 males.

The median income for a household in the village was $43,988, and the median income for a family was $51,042. Males had a median income of $41,016 versus $23,068 for females. The per capita income for the village was $19,211. About 5.5% of families and 5.6% of the population were below the poverty line, including 5.1% of those under age 18 and 8.4% of those age 65 or over.

== Education ==
It is in the Durand Community Unit School District 322.

== Notable person ==
- Carrie Ashton Johnson (1863–1949), editor, author
