= Eleroy, Illinois =

Eleroy
- Unincorporated community
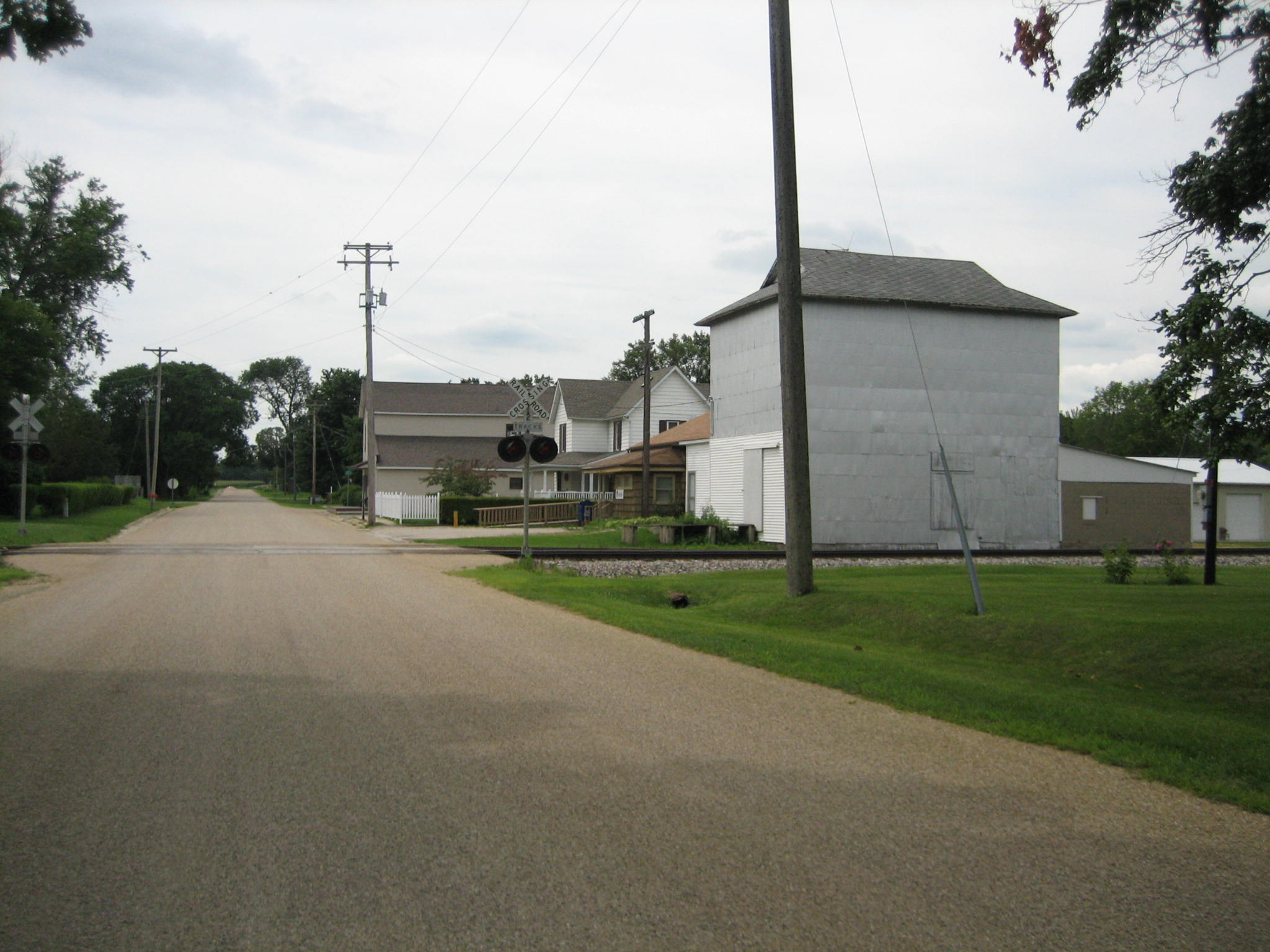
- A view toward buildings in Eleroy including the U.S. Post Office.

- Location of Eleroy within Illinois Eleroy (the United States)
- Coordinates: 42°19′57″N 89°45′38″W
- Country: United States
- State: Illinois
- County: Stephenson
- Township: Erin
- Elevation: 909 ft (277 m)

Population (2000)
  - Total: 85
- Time zone: UTC-6 (CST)
  - Summer (DST): UTC-5 (CDT)
- Postal code: 61027
- Area code: 815
- GNIS feature ID: 407857

Eleroy is an unincorporated community in Stephenson County, Illinois. The population was 85 at the 2000 census.

== History ==
Eleroy was founded in 1846. The community was named for E. LeRoy, son of the community's first settler Hiram Jones.
