= List of botanical gardens and arboretums in Illinois =

This list of botanical gardens and arboretums in Illinois is intended to include all significant botanical gardens and arboretums in the U.S. state of Illinois.

Name	Image	Affiliation	City	Coordinates
Anderson Japanese Gardens			Rockford	42°17′21.12″N 89°3′29.16″W
Bethalto Arboretum			Bethalto	38°54′45″N 90°02′00″W
Cantigny			Wheaton	41°51′17″N 88°09′21″W
Century Park Arboretum			Vernon Hills	42°14′49.81″N 87°57′42.58″W
Chicago Botanic Garden			Glencoe	42°8′54″N 87°47′24″W
Downers Grove Park District			Downers Grove	41°48′24.78″N 88°2′41.78″W
The Elmhurst Arboretum			Elmhurst	41°53′45.38″N 87°56′41.4″W
Evanston Township High School Arboretum		Evanston Township High School	Evanston	42°2′47.61″N 87°42′2.44″W
Fell Arboretum		Illinois State University	Normal	40°30′38.88″N 88°59′36.6″W
The Gardens at SIUE		Southern Illinois University	Edwardsville	38°48′32″N 89°59′34″W
Garfield Park Conservatory			Chicago	41°53′11″N 87°43′2″W
Hazel Crest Openlands			Hazel Crest	41°34′45.15″N 87°40′44.59″W
Heritage Gardens		Midway Village Museum	Rockford	42°16′47″N 88°59′10″W
Kaskaskia College Arboretum		Kaskaskia College	Centralia	38°33′45″N 89°11′34″W
Illinois Central College Arboretum		Illinois Central College	East Peoria	40°42′37.11″N 89°30′59.45″W
Illinois Wesleyan University Arboretum		Illinois Wesleyan University	Bloomington	40°29′24.72″N 88°59′38.2″W
Klehm Arboretum and Botanic Garden			Rockford	42°14′40.56″N 89°6′44.64″W
Kuechmann Arboretum			Lake Zurich	42°12′18.29″N 88°5′49.52″W
La Paloma Gardens			Rockford	42°17′36.0″N 89°02′06.6″W
Ladd Arboretum			Evanston	42°3′24.48″N 87°42′2.16″W
Lewis and Clark Community College		Lewis and Clark Community College	Godfrey	38°56′58.53″N 90°11′26.21″W
Lilacia Park			Lombard	41°53′6.72″N 88°1′13.8″W
Abraham Lincoln Memorial Garden			Springfield	39°41′50″N 89°35′50″W
Lincoln Park Conservatory			Chicago	41°55′26.4″N 87°38′7.08″W
Longview Park Conservatory and Gardens			Rock Island	41°29′42.36″N 90°34′27.48″W
George L. Luthy Memorial Botanical Garden			Peoria	40°43′3.36″N 89°34′30.36″W
Mabery Gelvin Botanical Garden			Mahomet	40°12′13.68″N 88°23′39.48″W
Marberry Arboretum		Southern Illinois University	Carbondale	37°41′57.2″N 89°12′35.3″W
Moraine Valley Community College		Moraine Valley Community College	Palos Hills	41°41′30.29″N 87°50′11.9″W
Morton Arboretum			Lisle	41°48′58″N 88°04′13″W
Nicholas Conservatory & Gardens			Rockford	42°16′55.3″N 89°04′17.4″W
North Central College		North Central College	Naperville	41°46′23.63″N 88°8′33.51″W
Oak Park Conservatory			Oak Park	41°52′17″N 87°47′22″W
Don Opel Arboretum		Highland Community College	Freeport	42°16′58.08″N 89°40′23.88″W
Proksa Park			Berwyn	41°50′14.3″N 87°47′55.12″W
Quad City Botanical Center			Rock Island	41°30′35.28″N 90°33′51.12″W
Sinnissippi Gardens			Rockford	42°17′02.5″N 89°04′04.4″W
Standish Park Arboretum			Galesburg	40°56′42″N 90°22′19″W
Starhill Forest Arboretum			Petersburg	39°56′6″N 89°48′6″W
Timothy Christian Schools Arboretum			Elmhurst	41°52′1.4″N 87°56′33.34″W
Tinker Swiss Cottage and Gardens			Rockford	42°15′55″N 89°6′7″W
University of Chicago Botanic Garden		University of Chicago	Chicago	41°47′22.5″N 87°35′58.7″W
University of Illinois Arboretum		University of Illinois	Urbana	40°5′38.04″N 88°13′1.2″W
University of Illinois Conservatory and Plant Collection		University of Illinois	Urbana	40°6′8.64″N 88°13′21″W
Village of Homewood Arboretum			Homewood	41°33′46.54″N 87°39′56.96″W
Village of River Forest			River Forest	41°53′15.13″N 87°49′12.43″W
Washington Park			Springfield	39°46′58.8″N 89°39′0″W
Western Illinois School of Agriculture Greenhouse		Western Illinois University	Macomb	40°28′34.48″N 90°41′11.91″W
Wilder Park Conservatory			Elmhurst	41°53′41.28″N 87°56′38.4″W

== See also ==
- List of botanical gardens and arboretums in the United States
