= Richard Mulcahey =

American politician and educator (1935–2026)

Member of the Illinois House of Representatives from the 69th district
- In office 1974

Member of the Illinois House of Representatives from the 74th district
- In office 1992–1993
- Succeeded by: Ron Lawfer

Personal details
- Born: March 22, 1935 Rockford, Illinois, U.S.
- Died: September 24, 2026 (aged 91)
- Party: Democratic
- Education: Wisconsin State University; University of Illinois

Richard Thomas Mulcahey (March 22, 1935 – September 24, 2026) was an American politician and educator who served as a Democratic member of the Illinois House of Representatives from 1975 until 1993.

== Life and career ==
Richard Thomas Mulcahey was born in Rockford, Illinois, on March 22, 1935. He earned a bachelor of science degree with a history major from Wisconsin State University and later did graduate work at the University of Illinois. Mulcahey served in the United States Marine Corps from 1954 to 1956 with the 1st Marine Division. He then became a teacher and taught at schools in Galena and Durand.

In 1974, Mulcahey was elected to the Illinois House of Representatives along with Democratic incumbent Robert E. Brinkmeier and Republican Harlan Rigney. In 1982, after the passage of the Cutback Amendment, which eliminated multi-member House districts, Mulcahey was elected to represent the 69th district, which included all of Jo Daviess and Stephenson counties along with western Winnebago County. During the 1980s, Mulcahey chaired the Education Committee.

In 1992, the Republican controlled redistricting committee renumbered the district the 74th and drew it to include all of Jo Daviess and Stephenson counties along with portions of Carroll, Ogle, and Whiteside counties. Mulcahey initially planned to retire and lost re-election to Ron Lawfer, a Republican member of the Jo Daviess County Board, after changing those plans and running for reelection.

Mulcahey died on September 24, 2026, at the age of 91.
