= Rigney =

Rigney may refer to:

- Rigney, Doubs, Bourgogne-Franche-Comté, France
- Flagey-Rigney, Bourgogne-Franche-Comté, France

== People with the surname ==
- Alitya Rigney (1942–2017), Australian Aboriginal scholar
- Ann Rigney (born 1957), Irish/Dutch cultural scholar
- Anne Rigney, Irish visual artist and sculptor
- Bill Rigney (1918–2001), American baseball infielder and manager
- Brian Rigney (born 1963), Irish former rugby union player
- Colm Rigney (born 1978), Irish rugby union player and coach
- Dorothy Comiskey Rigney (1916–1971), American businesswoman
- Ed Rigney (1893–1975), Australian rugby league footballer
- Frank Rigney (1936–2010), Canadian football offensive tackle
- Harlan Rigney (1933–1994), American farmer and politician
- Harriet Rigney (born 1939), American editor
- Hubert Rigney (born 1971), Irish former sportsperson
- Hugh M. Rigney (1873–1950), U.S. Representative from Illinois
- Jackson A. Rigney (1913–1998), American professor
- James Oliver Rigney, Jr. (1948–2007), American author better known by his pen name Robert Jordan
- Johnny Rigney (1914–1984), American baseball starting pitcher
- Layne Rigney, head of American outdoor equipment company Osprey Packs
- Niall Rigney (born 1969), Irish former hurling manager and player
- Stephen A. Rigney (1870–1947), American farmer and politician
- Tara Rigney (born 1999), Australian representative rower
- Tom Rigney, American musician
- Topper Rigney (1897–1972), American professional baseball player
- Tracey Rigney, writer on the 2022 Australian-New Zealand film We Are Still Here
- Wal Rigney (1898–1965), Australian rugby union player
