= Robert E. Brinkmeier =

American politician, businessman and educator

Robert E. Brinkmeier (May 20, 1922 – March 9, 2007) was an American politician, businessman and educator who served as a Democratic member of the Illinois House of Representatives from 1967 to 1977.

== Biography ==
Brinkmeier was born on a farm near Pearl City in Stephenson County, Illinois. He attended Shannon High School in Carroll County, Illinois. He served in the United States Army Air Forces during World War II. He received his bachelor's degree from Bradley University and his master's degree from Northern Illinois University. He was a teacher, coach, and athletic director at several high schools. Brinkmeier was also in the insurance business and lived in Freeport, Illinois.

In 1964, he ran for the United States House of Representatives in Illinois's 16th congressional district against Republican incumbent John B. Anderson. Brinkmeier lost receiving 43.6% of the vote to Anderson's 56.4%. Two years later, Brinkmeier was elected to the Illinois House of Representatives in 1966 as one of three members from the 35th district along with Republicans Merle K. Anderson and Robert Law.

In 1976, he was appointed to the Advisory Committee on the Compensation of General Assembly. That same year, Brinkmeier was unable to secure reelection losing to Republican incumbent Harlan Rigney, Democratic incumbent Richard Mulcahey, and Republican candidate Harold Adams.

After his loss, he was appointed a motor carrier auditor with the Illinois Secretary of State. He held this job, which involved auditing books of Illinois trucking companies who do business outside of the state, until 1979 when he became assistant superintendent of the Illinois State Fair. In 1983, Neil Hartigan hired Brinkmeier to serve as Legislative Director in the Office of the Illinois Attorney General.

Brinkmeier died at Memorial Health Center in Springfield, Illinois in 2007.
