= William Buckley Peck =

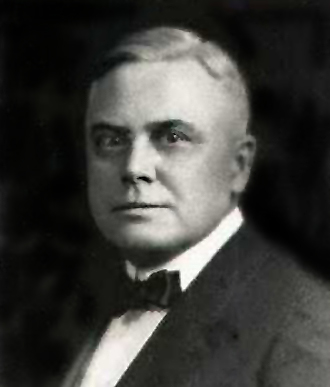
- Born: October 11, 1870; Freeport, Illinois, U.S.
- Died: August 20, 1941 (aged 70); Freeport, Illinois, U.S.
- Resting place: Oakland Cemetery, Freeport, Illinois
- Education: Willamette University in Portland, Oregon - BA; Rush Medical College in Chicago, Illinois - MD; Royal London Hospital in London, England
- Occupations: physician and surgeon
- Spouse: Alvina E. Weber

William Buckley Peck Jr. (October 11, 1870 - August 20, 1941) was a prominent physician and surgeon who founded, and for 25 years, served as the managing director of the Inter-State Postgraduate Medical Association of North America, became widely known locally and internationally because of his efforts in continuing education of medical professionals by leading groups of physicians to seminars at European centers of advanced medicine through the Association.

== Early life ==
Dr. Peck was born in Freeport, Illinois on October 11, 1870. At the age of 2, Peck's family moved to a homestead in western Nebraska, receiving his education in the distinct schools several miles from the homestead. At the age of 12 the family moved to Aurora, Nebraska, where Peck's father, an attorney, became Aurora's first mayor.

== Education ==
At the age of 17 Peck entered Willamette University in Salem, Oregon receiving a B. A. degree in 1893. At the age of 27 Peck graduated with a medical degree from Rush Medical College in Chicago in 1897.

In 1907 and 1908 Peck continued his education in Europe with additional post-graduate work in Vienna and Berlin. In 1909 Peck was invited to take a prestigious temporary position as assistant to the chief of surgery at the Royal London Hospital in London, England for four months.

== Return to Freeport ==
Peck returned to Freeport, Illinois, serving for a time as Stephenson County Coroner during his early career, and serving as a member of the Stephenson County Medical Examining Board during World War I.

== Inter-State Postgraduate Medical Association of North America ==
In 1916 Peck organized what was then known as the Tri-State Medical Society when a small group of area physicians met at the Freeport Country club. At the next society meeting held in the Masonic Temple in Freeport, as many as 400 physicians were in attendance from Illinois, Iowa and Wisconsin.

Peck then recognized that there was a need for an organization that could offer service through keeping medical professionals abreast of the advances in western medicine, many of which were coming from Europe at that time. Peck was elected as the first president of the body. The organization soon grew into the Inter-State Postgraduate Medical Association of North America.

In 1935 Peck was honored by members of his profession at a convention in Detroit, Michigan by recognizing Peck's success as the organizer and managing director of the Inter-State Postgraduate Medical Association of North America where one of the principal speakers acknowledging Peck's accomplishments was Dr. William James Mayo (1861–1939), one of the founders of the Mayo Clinic. Peck also had a handwritten personal note from Thomas Edison congratulating Peck on his accomplishments with the Inter-State Postgraduate Medical Association.

Peck's duties as managing director of the association, accompanied by his wife, often took members to all the leading medical centers in Europe and South America. Since 1925 there were 15 trips to Europe. On a trip to Moscow Peck lead his delegation to meet with Dr.Nikolai Nilovich Burdenko, a Russian and Soviet surgeon, founder of Soviet neurosurgery, chief surgeon of the Red Army from 1937 to 1946, statesman and public figure, Academician of the USSR Academy of Sciences, Chief surgeon of the Red Army (1941-1946), President of the Academy of Medical Sciences, Honorary Member of the International Society of Surgeons - Royal Society of London, Member of the USSR Central Executive Committee, Laureate of the Stalin Prize.

The Tri-State Medical society that Peck founded in 1916, continues today, going by the moniker IPMA (Interstate Postgraduate Medical Association) in Madison Wisconsin, as a physician-led 501(c)(3) organization providing independent educational services for medical professionals.

== Organizations/Affiliations ==
- Managing Director Inter-State Postgraduate Medical Association of North America
- District surgeon for the Chicago and North Western Railroad
- Fellow of the American Medical Association
- Fellow of the American College of Surgeons
- Member of the Illinois State Medical Society
- Member of the Stephenson County Medical Society
- Member of the American Medical Association of Vienna, Austria
- Member of the Anglo-American Society of Berlin
- Member of the Association Pour be Development des Relations Medicals, Paris, France
- Member of the Surgical Club of the London Hospital
- Member of all Masonic lodges in Freeport, Illinois
- Member of the Mystic Shrine in Rockford, Illinois

== Personal life ==
Peck married Alvina E. Weber of Merrill, Wisconsin on September 26, 1912. The couple had no children.
