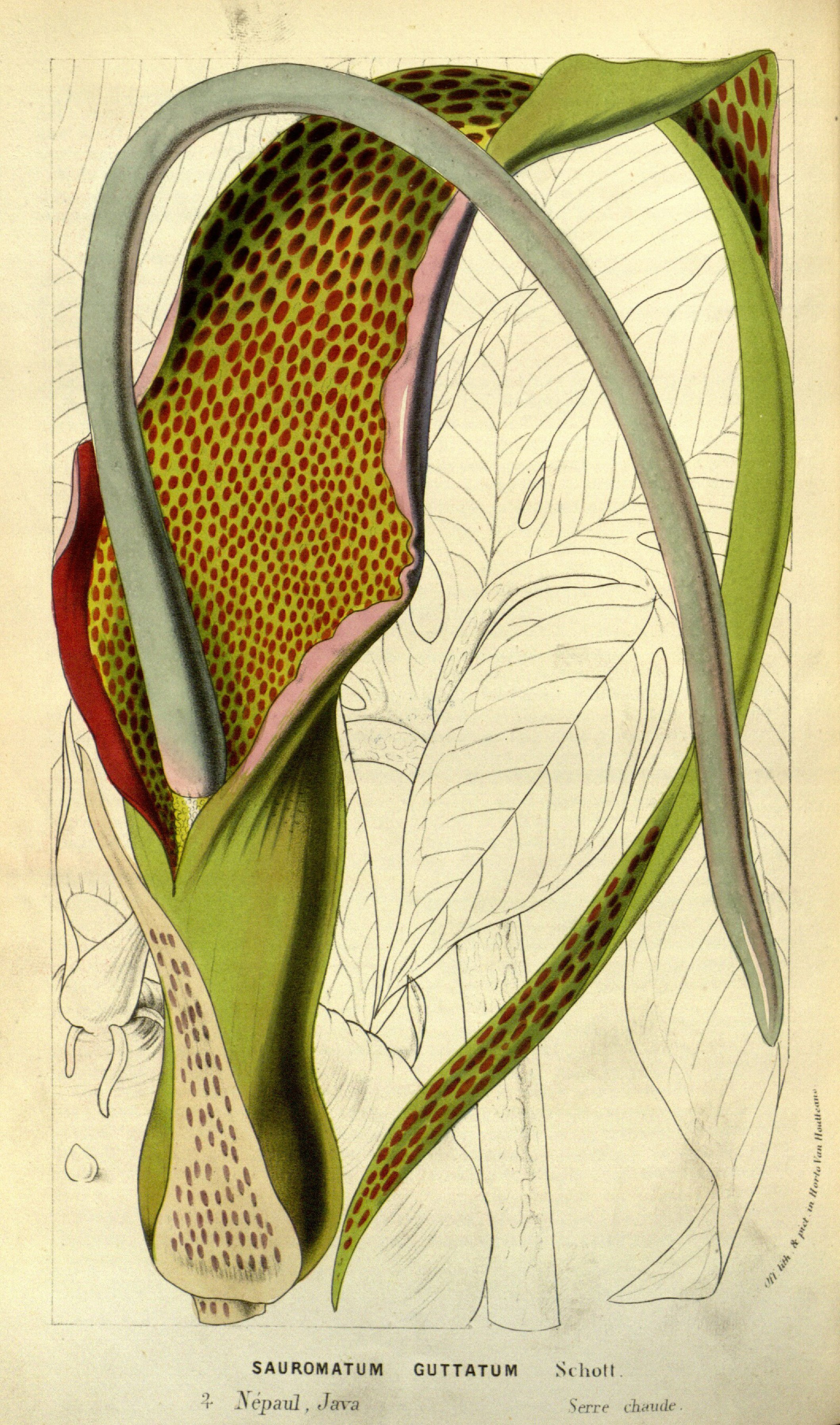

Conservation status
- Least Concern (IUCN 3.1)

Scientific classification
- Kingdom: Plantae
- Clade: Tracheophytes
- Clade: Angiosperms
- Clade: Monocots
- Order: Alismatales
- Family: Araceae
- Genus: Sauromatum
- Species: S. venosum

Binomial name
- Sauromatum venosum (Dryand. ex Aiton) Kunth

Synonyms
- Arum venosum Dryand. ex Aiton (1789); Arisaema venosum (Dryand. ex Aiton) Blume (1836); Desmesia venosum (Dryand. ex Aiton) Raf. (1837); Typhonium venosum (Dryand. ex Aiton) Hett. & P.C.Boyce (2000)

= Sauromatum venosum =

Voodoo lily

Species of flowering plant

Sauromatum venosum is a species of plant in the arum family (Araceae). It is native to Asia and Africa, where it grows in forests and riparian meadows.

It is grown as an ornamental plant. Its common names include voodoo lily and monarch of the East.

== Description ==
This species grows from a corm, producing an inflorescence with a yellowish spathe covered in large purple spots and a purple spadix. The green leaf appears after the inflorescence develops. It has 9 to 11 pedate leaflets each up to 40 centimeters long borne on a tall petiole. The mature flowers emit an odor described as "putrid" and compared to rotting meat. The odor is attractive to insects such as flies, which pollinate the plant. Like some other aroids it is a thermogenic plant, generating its own heat.

== In cultivation ==
This is a readily cultivated plant, popular as an ornamental. The Missouri Botanical Garden suggests growing it far away from windows and walkways "where the brief but overpowering odor from the spadices will be found objectionable".

== Gallery ==
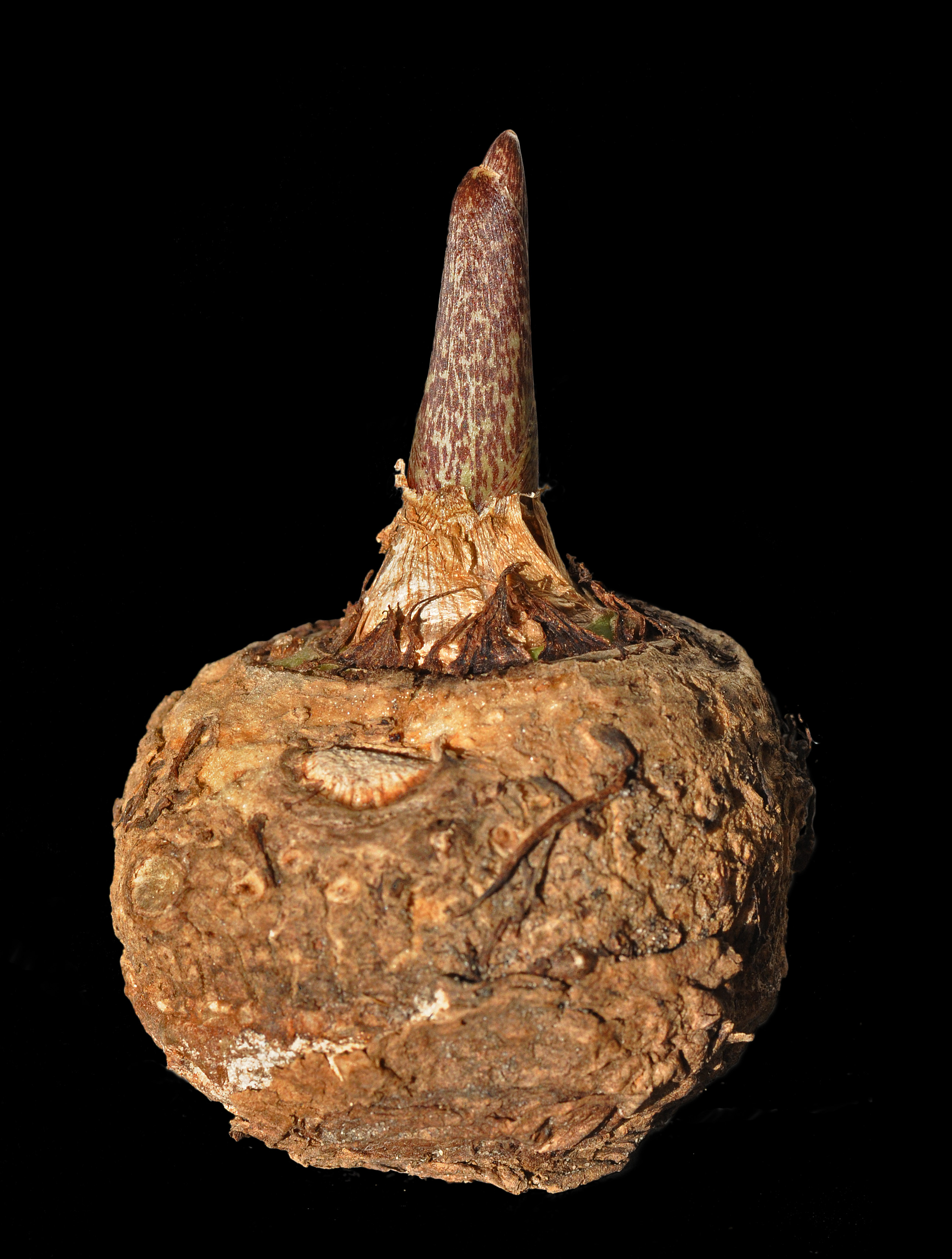
Corm

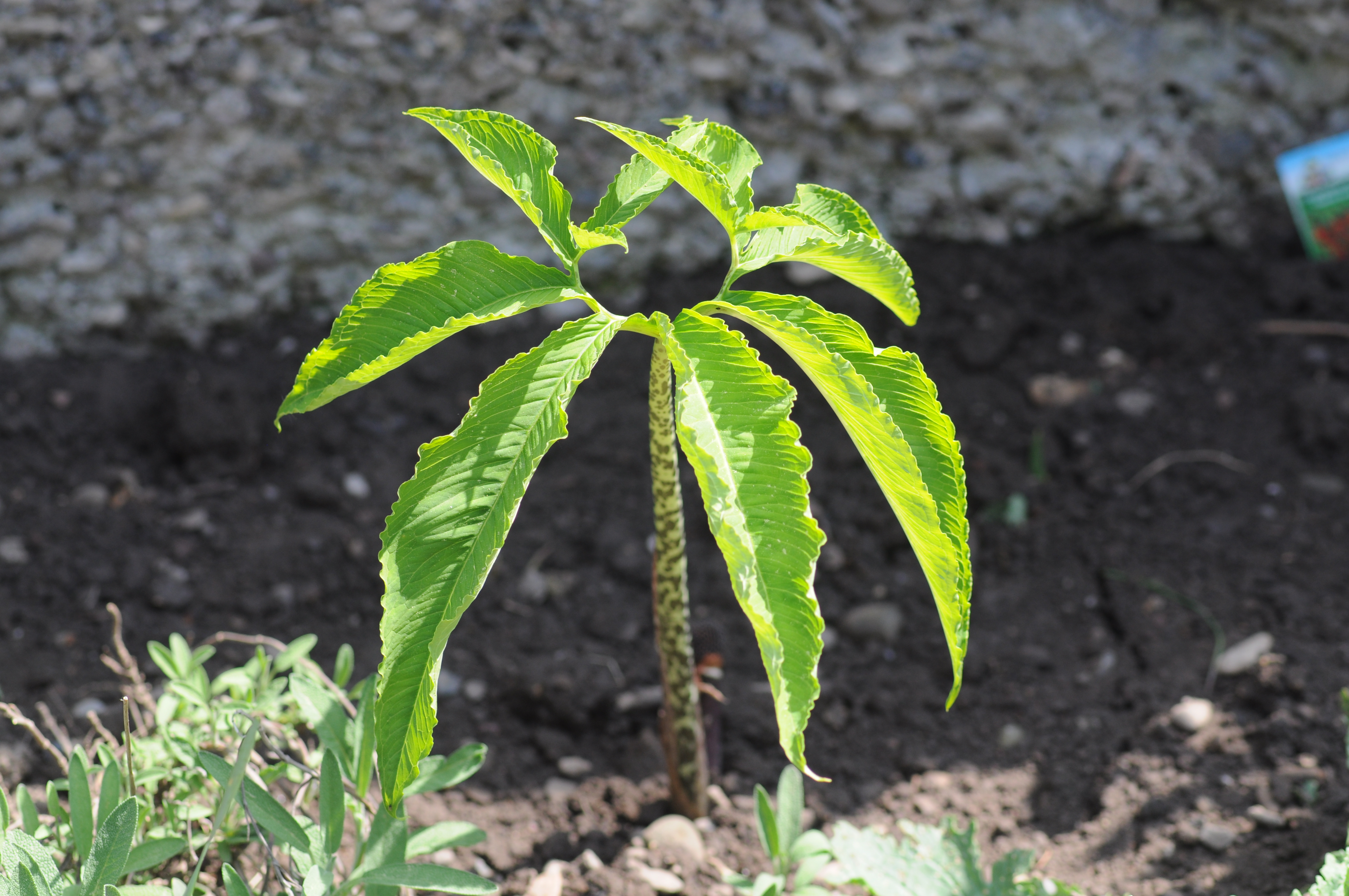
Stem

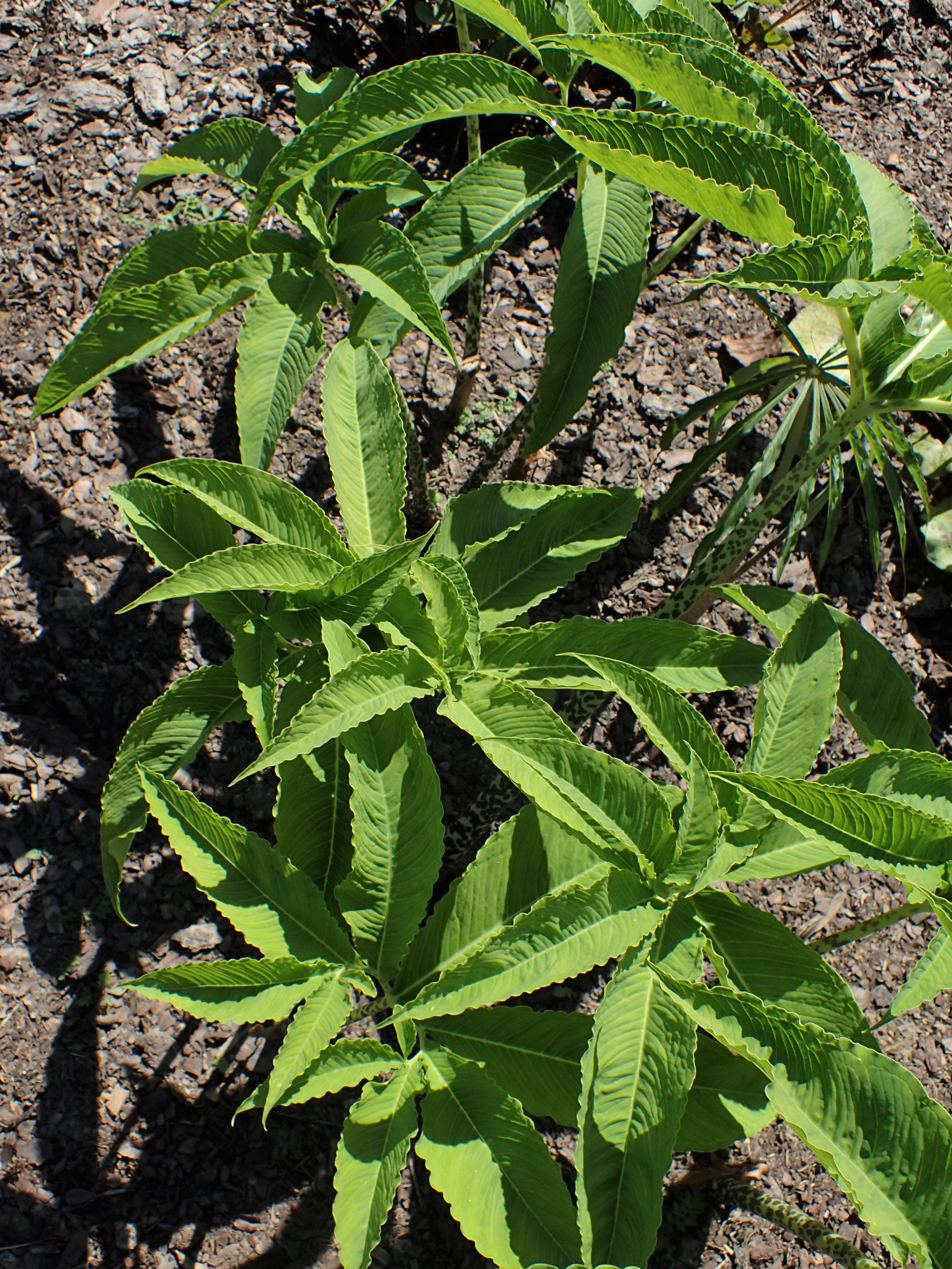
Leaves

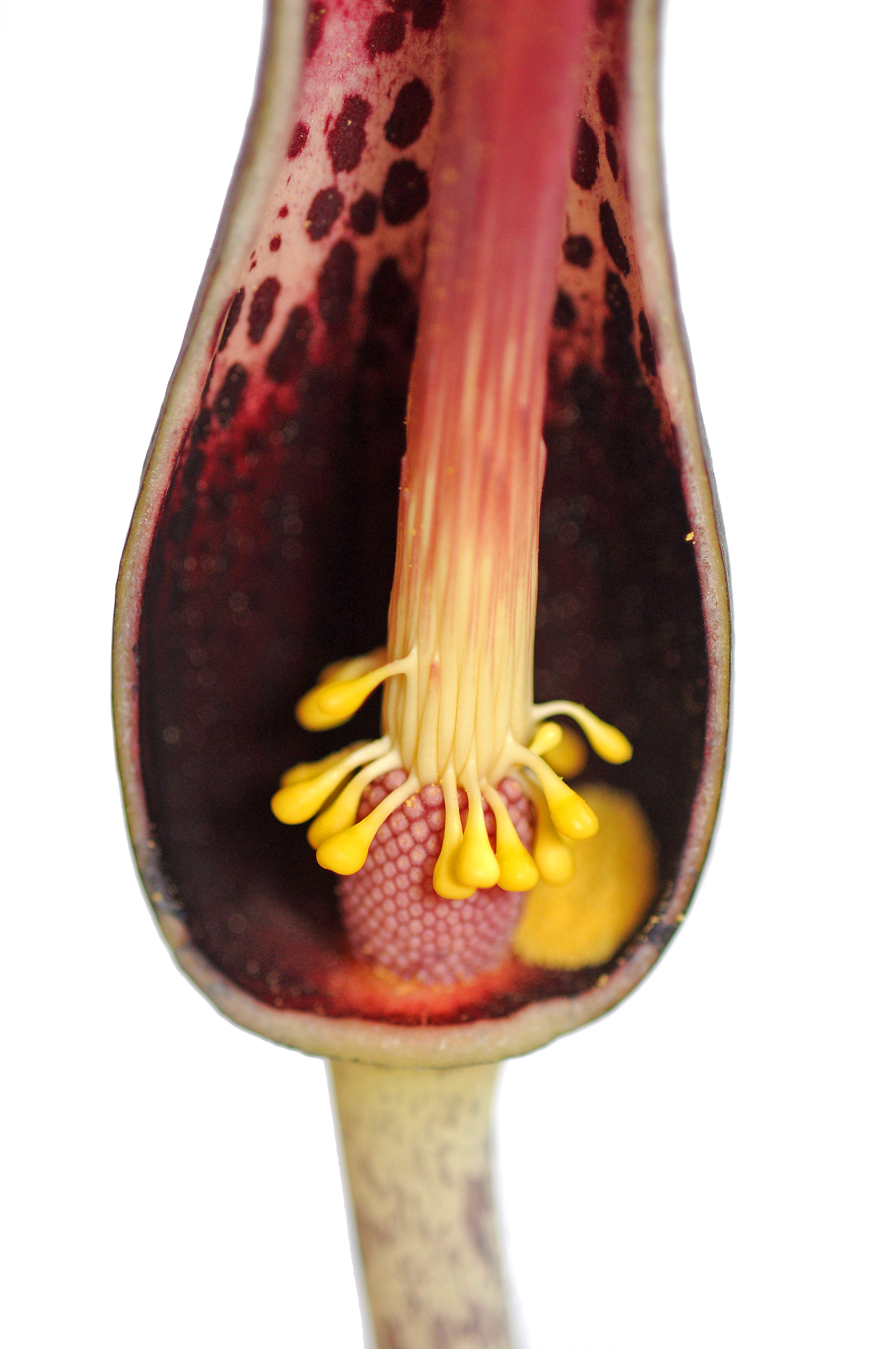
Flower cross-section

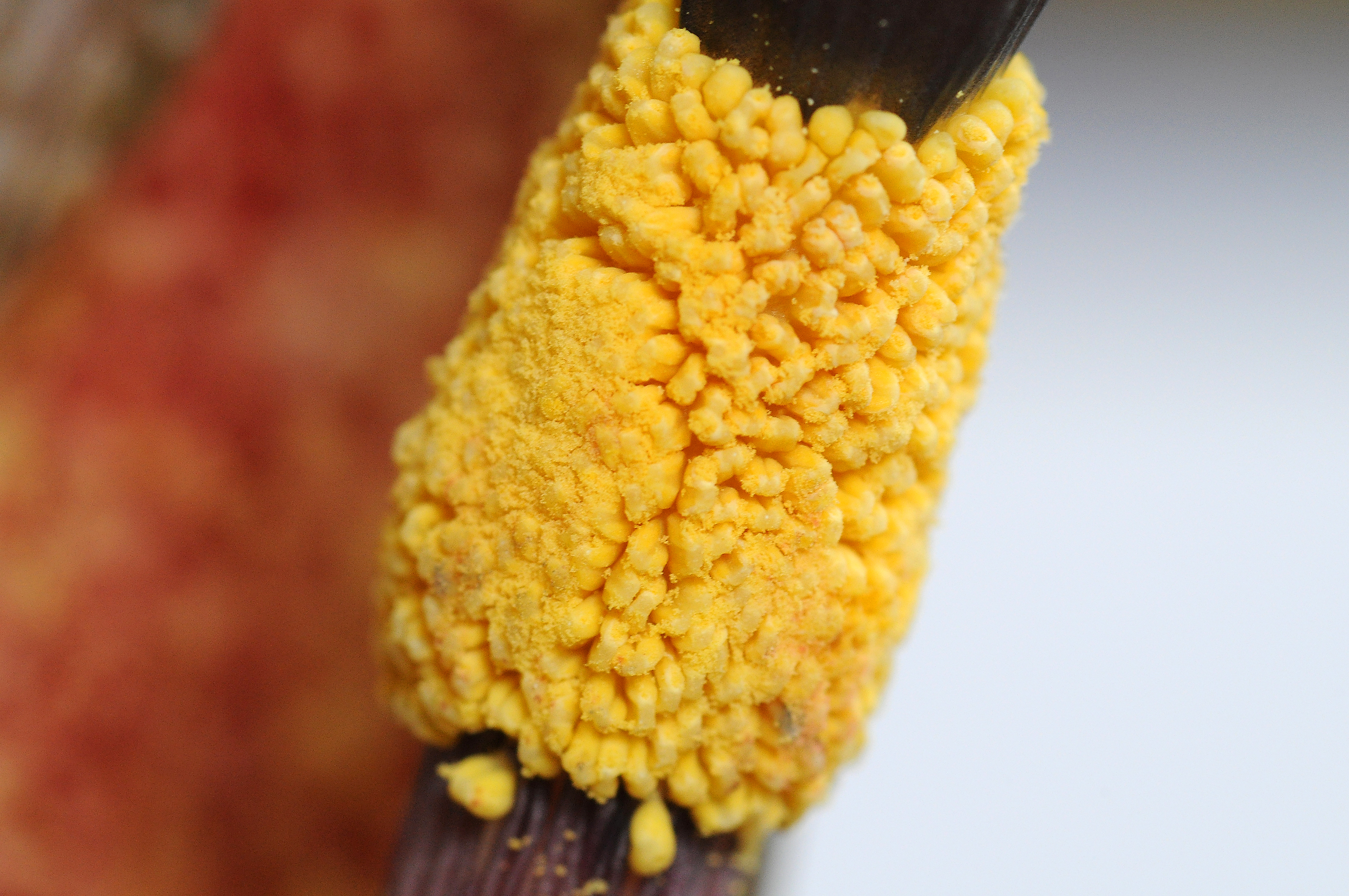
Pollen

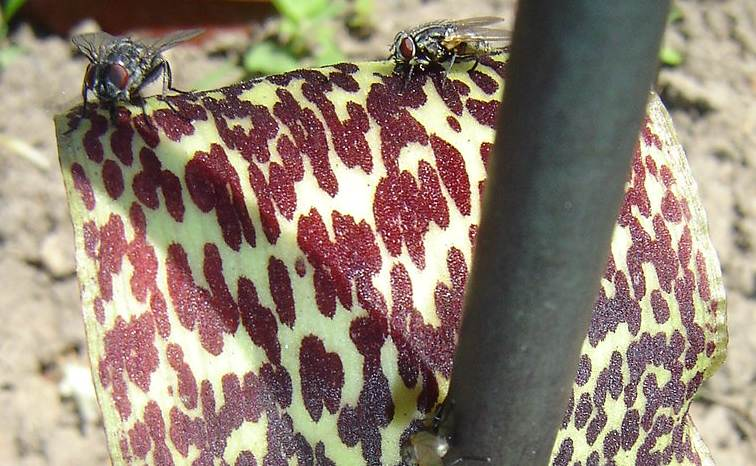
Spathe with pollinators

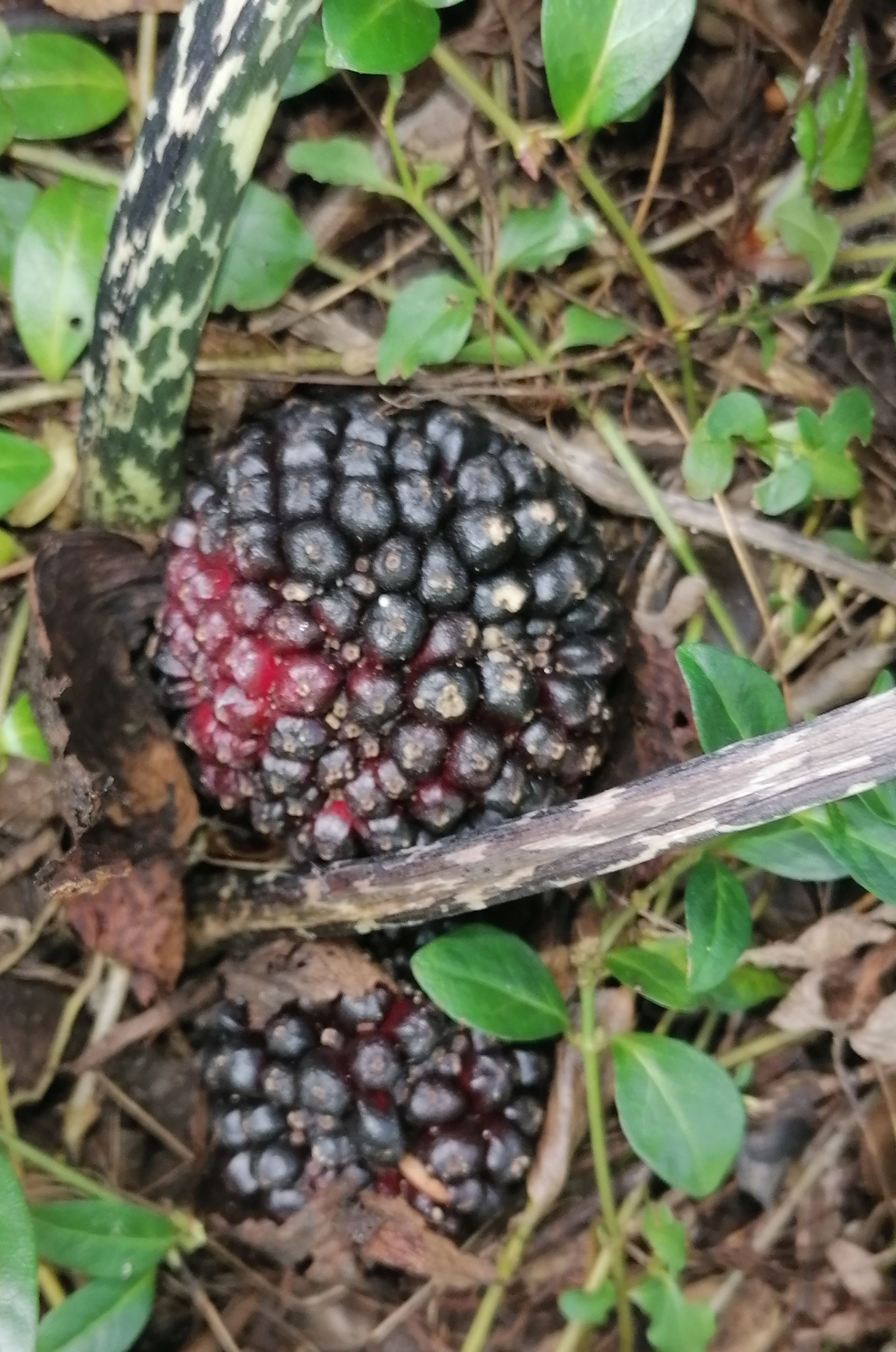
Fruit (immature)

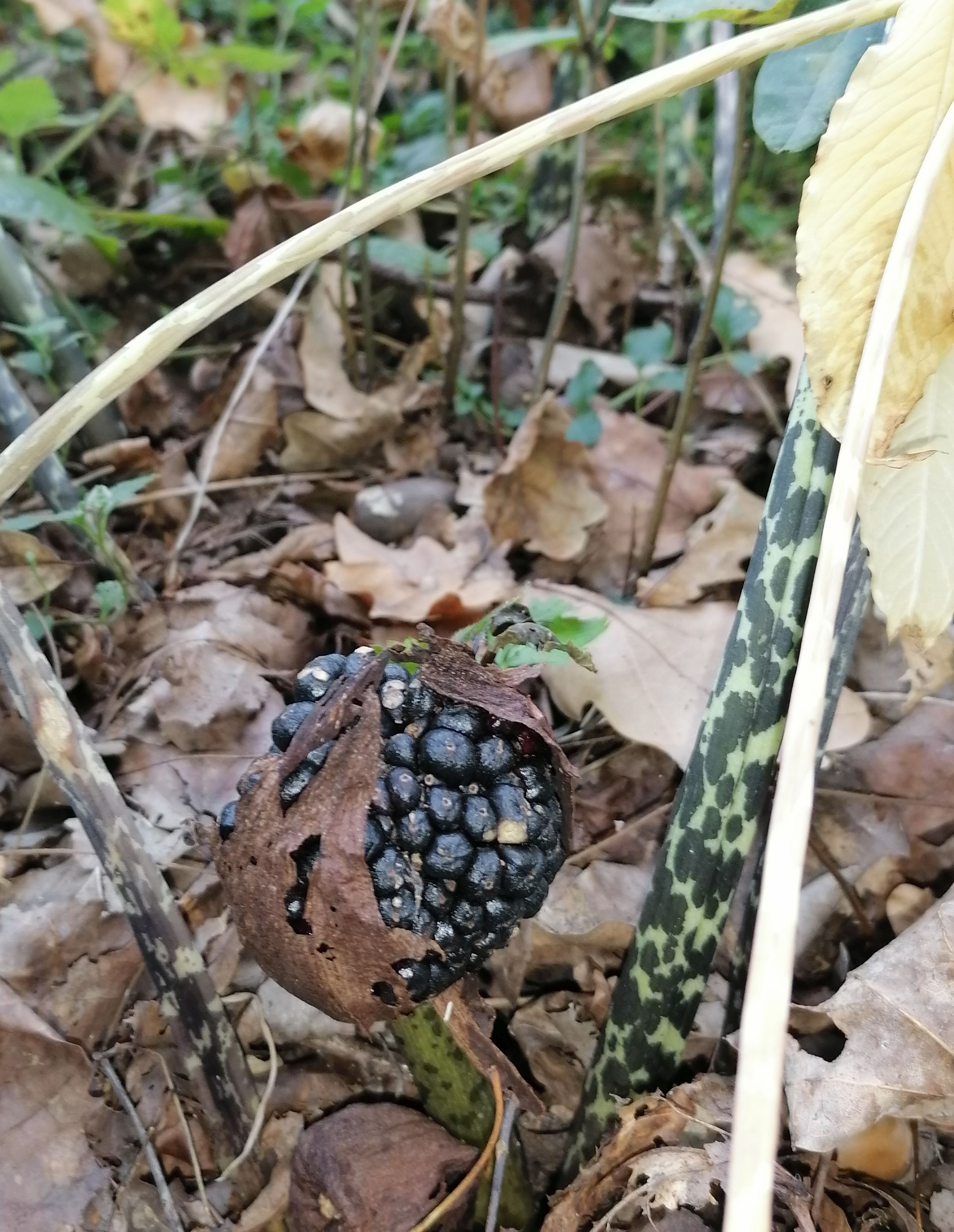
Fruit (mature)
