= Red Oak, Illinois =

- Unincorporated community
- Location within Illinois Location within the United States
- Coordinates: 42°23′32″N 89°40′18″W
- Country: United States
- State: Illinois
- County: Stephenson
- Elevation: 791 ft (241 m)
- Time zone: UTC-6 (Central (CST))
  - Summer (DST): UTC-5 (CDT)
- Zip code: 61066
- Area codes: 815 & 779
- GNIS feature ID: 416454

Red Oak is an unincorporated community located along Richland Creek in Buckeye Township, Stephenson County, Illinois, United States. Red Oak is in Orangeville Community School District.

== History ==
Stephen A. Rigney (180–1947), Illinois state representative and farmer, was born near Red Oak.
