= University of Illinois Conservatory and Plant Collection =

Conservatory and botanical garden in Urbana, Illinois

Coordinates: 40.1024°N 88.2225°W

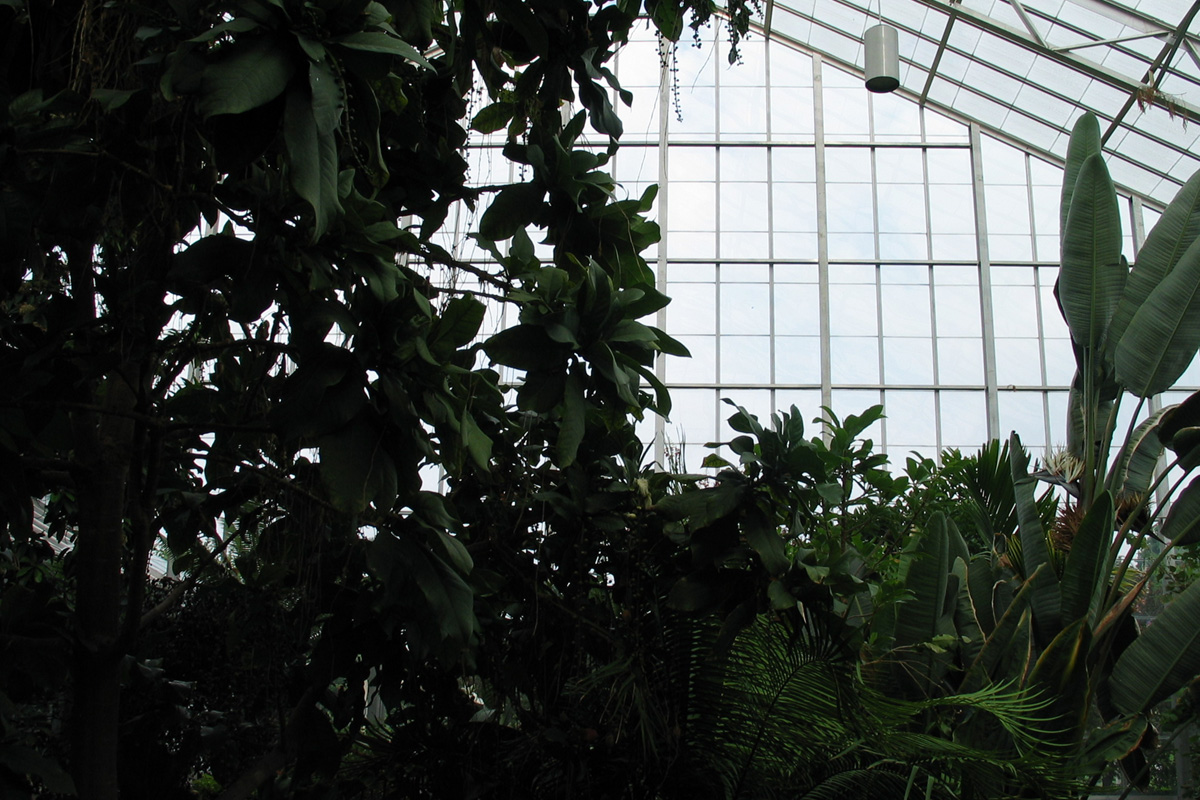
- Plant Sciences Laboratory conservatory
- Interactive map of University of Illinois Conservatory and Plant Collection
- Location: University of Illinois at Urbana–Champaign, 1201 South Dorner Drive, Urbana, Illinois
- Area: 2,000-square-foot (190 m^{2})
- Website: Official website

The University of Illinois Plant Biology Greenhouse and Conservatory is on the University of Illinois at Urbana–Champaign campus. It is a 2,000-square-foot (190 m^{2}) conservatory and botanical garden located in the Plant Sciences Laboratory Greenhouses at 1201 South Dorner Drive, Urbana, Illinois. The conservatory is generally open to the public daily when the university is in session, though it may be closed for classes, research, or special events.

The conservatory houses over 200 species and 60 families of tropical and subtropical plants selected for their botanical interest or economic importance. Separate greenhouses contain ferns, bromeliads, cycads, orchids, carnivorous plants, herb and spice plants, and cacti, euphorbia, and other succulents. There is also an outdoor butterfly garden.

Plants of special interest include Brighamia insignis, Lebronnecia kokioides, and Sauromatum venosum.

== Access ==
In 2005, The Daily Illini reported that the Plant Biology Conservatory had very few visitors due to lack of awareness that it was open to the public, calling it "a secret garden – the hidden green gem of the University of Illinois".

== See also ==
- List of botanical gardens in the United States
- David Gottlieb
