= Tutty Baker =

American pioneer (1793–1855)

William "Tutty" Baker (1793–1855) was an American pioneer credited as the founder of Freeport, Illinois. Originating from the southern United States, he claimed the land which would become Freeport, then occupied by the Ho-Chunk tribe, in 1827, though he did not immediately build a homestead. He received the nickname "Tutty" from the tribe, which he was on good terms with, on account of his stutter. He built a trading post on the banks of the Pecatonica River. A generous man, Baker began operating a free ferry across the river and even invited travelers into his home for meals and lodging. According to one story, Freeport earned its name after Baker's wife, Elizabeth Phoebe Baker, asked him if his river port was a "Free Port", because of the number of people he didn't charge to ferry across the river.

A monument to him was erected in Freeport by the Daughters of the American Revolution.
