= William Thomas Rawleigh =

American politician

W.T. Rawleigh
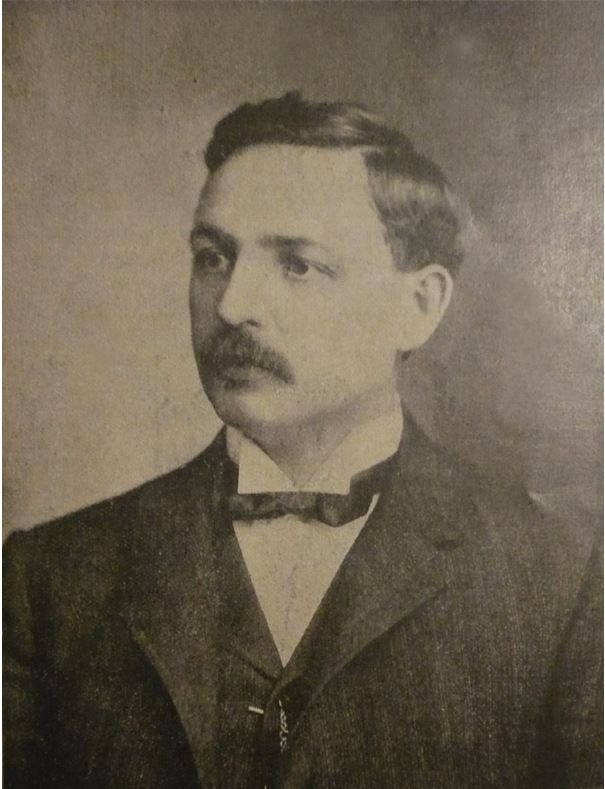
- W.T. Rawleigh c. 1900
- Born: December 3, 1870; Mineral Point, Wisconsin, U.S.
- Died: January 23, 1951 (aged 80); Freeport, Illinois, U.S.
- Occupation: Business magnate
- Known for: Door-to-door salesman of "Good Health Products"
- Spouses: Minnie Belle Trevillian (m. 1890; div. 1917) M. Marguerite Schneider (m. 1923; died 1942)
- Children: 3

William Thomas Rawleigh (December 3, 1870 – January 23, 1951) was a businessman and politician in the state of Illinois.

== Early life ==
W.T. Rawleigh was born on the family farm, near Mineral Point, Wisconsin, on December 3, 1870. As the oldest of a family of three boys and four girls born to Charles David and Sarah Malinda Rawleigh, it was necessary for Rawleigh to take on adult responsibilities at a young age in order to help provide income beyond the daily chores that a life in agriculture required. Rawleigh's restless and inquisitive mind was not really interested in the endless and repetitive chores associated with living on a farm. It would take some time to work out exactly what he was interested in, but it had something to do with bringing a little bit of civilization to those who lived remotely in rural areas. Whatever the cause, his first notable achievement was at the age of nine when he began selling ink to his schoolmates and country storekeepers. Most importantly was that he not only made the ink himself but he also bottled and labeled it. Proudly, the name he printed on the label was Rawleigh's Mineraline Ink, which not only identified himself as the manufacturer but also where he came from, Mineral Point.

Rawleigh was very cognizant of the variety of salesmen who stopped at his home selling farm medicines, inspiring him to the overall potential that this type of operation provided. The combination of his incredible imagination, coupled with his natural organizational skills, pushed him to persuade his father to let him work for a neighbor as a farmhand for $20 a month in order to make money so he could get started selling farm medicines. By the end of the summer he had earned $120 and gave $100 of it to his parents. His father still objected to the idea of selling door-to-door, but by spring finally gave permission, though he refused to provide Rawleigh with money for freight and other starting expenses. He did, however; let him use a horse and helped him to buy a rig. Inspired by the selling methods of the J.R. Watkins Medical Company, Rawleigh packed his clothes and departed to Stephenson County, Illinois.

== The W T Rawleigh Company ==
=== Salesman ===
Rawleigh's life as an independent salesman began on April 6, 1889, when he was 18 years old. Initially he turned his mother's kitchen into a part-time factory in order to produce liniment, until he could get enough money together to rent a small building. Many medicines were made, bottled and labelled in the Rawleigh family home. His first products were functional and filled the needs of the rural population. They included an antiseptic salve, a liniment that was labeled; For the internal and external use for man or beast!, a medicated ointment, and a product named External AP (anti-pain) Oil. All of these products were manufactured by Rawleigh and sold from farmhouse to farmhouse in a buggy drawn by a horse named Bill that he borrowed from a neighbor. It's clear that he had found a ready market for the products he was offering and, in his travels, he also heard from the wives of farmers about what else they would like him to bring the next time he called. Rawleigh secured a large number of customers with his dependable service, honest methods, and free trials. He would leave products on "time and trial" knowing that the products would sell themselves. Beyond the previously listed items, the company also sold sewing machine oil, cough syrup, mustard, chewing gum hog mixture and even farm machinery (hit-and-miss engines) as well as cosmetics. Rawleigh also distributed spices such as vanilla, peppermint and many others in his stock of consumer offerings.

By 1892, Rawleigh was successful enough to start advertising and soon after that, he mortgaged his home, borrowed money from all available sources, and started his first small factory and laboratory in a rented building in downtown Freeport, Illinois. Advertising was a major influence for Rawleigh, in 1892 he put together a booklet explaining his products and distributed it widely. This booklet was to be the forerunner of the famous Rawleigh Good Health Guide, Almanac and Cookbook, a book that continued to be published until 1960, nine years after his death. It was a guide for the whole family with the range of Rawleigh products accommodating the different needs of both sexes. In 1895, Rawleigh founded the Dr. Blair Medical Company which, in 1902, became known as the W. T. Rawleigh Medical Company. In 1896 his company became incorporated and trademarked the name, "Rawleigh's". Two years later, in 1898, he built his first factory building, located on Douglas Avenue in the residence district of Freeport. In a laboratory in that building, Mr. J.R. Jackson, his brother-in-law, under Rawleigh's supervision, made careful tests and established new standards of strength and uniformity. Rawleigh focused on manufacturing medicinal products and non-medicinal products that had health-promoting qualities. The importance of scientifically tested products and the "try before you buy" approach, was a hallmark of the Rawleigh's brand. To meet the need of scientific advancement, Rawleigh built the company's first Analytical Laboratory in 1898 and, as the company grew, the laboratory was enlarged numerous times.

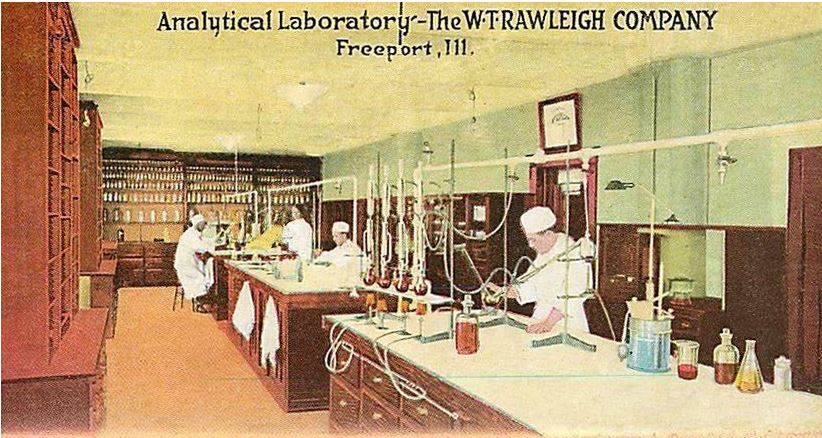
Postcard of the Rawleigh Analytical Laboratory in Freeport, Illinois.

=== Manufacturer ===
By 1914 The W T Rawleigh Medical Company was recognized as one of the greatest manufacturers and distributors of over 100 household products and in 1916 changed the company name to "The W T Rawleigh Company". Based on need, the Freeport factory was not enough for Rawleigh and by the start of World War I there were almost 1,000 Rawleigh dealers, and factories in Memphis, Tennessee; Chester, Pennsylvania; Oakland, California; and two branches in Canada, based in Winnipeg and Montreal.

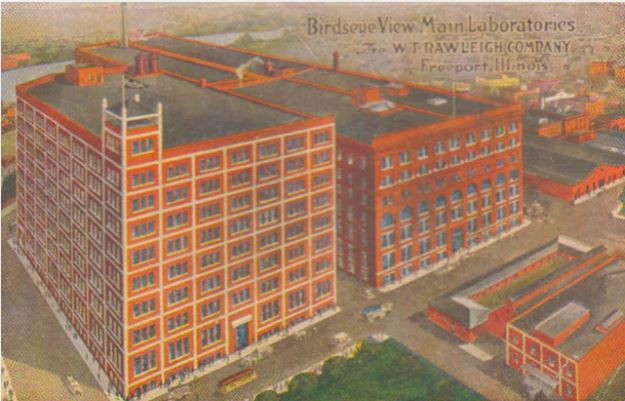
Postcard of the Rawleigh manufacturing building in Freeport, Illinois.

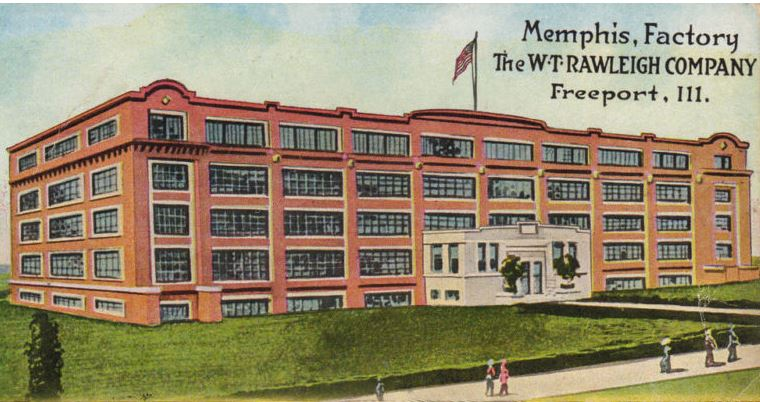
Postcard of the Rawleigh manufacturing building in Memphis, Tennessee.

Rawleigh's expansion continued after the war with factories established in Melbourne, Australia, in 1928 and in Wellington, New Zealand, in 1931. He also established warehouses in Zanzibar, Madagascar and Sumatra, where raw materials such as vanilla, cloves, pepper, ylang-ylang and oil of geranium were assembled before being shipped to his factories. Rawleigh opened a vanilla office in Tamatave and began to cultivate, cure and buy vanilla. He did this because at that time the vanilla industry was highly inflated, closely controlled and manipulated and prices were about double what they should have been. To ensure the quality of his products, Rawleigh personally visited most of the countries where he sourced raw materials, including stops in Indonesia, Singapore, Japan, and China.

=== The Rawleigh Man ===
By 1915, an estimated 2,000 "Rawleigh men" distributed Rawleigh products while visiting approximately 20,000 customers daily. The Rawleigh company did not do expensive advertising or newspaper ads, instead it relied on the products their benefits, and the Rawleigh man going into homes to sell their products. By 1922 over twenty million customers had admitted the Rawleigh man into their homes. Rawleigh's business was involved in the total supply chain from sourcing raw materials to distribution of manufactured products. Rawleigh's manufactured its own packaging and labeling materials, had a bottle manufacturing factory in Freeport, and even produced carriages that his future salesmen would use to sell his merchandise. Despite his early entry into the toilet goods field he did not seek to protect most of his products through trademarks, other than the Rawleigh name.

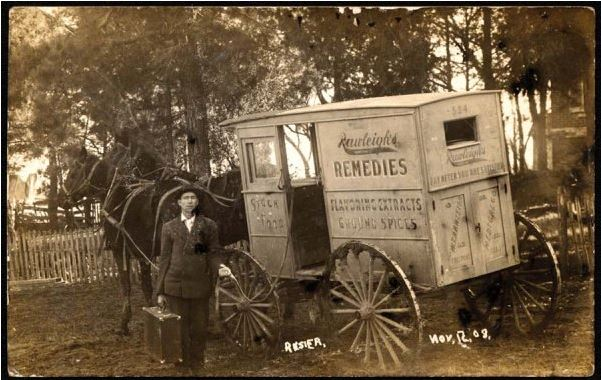
The Rawleigh Man, 1909

The "Rawleigh Man" was helped in reaching out to his clientele by following the detailed practices and scripts in the 542 page book "Rawleigh Methods, A Guide Book for Rawleigh Dealers" published in 1938.

== Personal life ==
Rawleigh married twice, first to Minnie B. Trevillian on November 16, 1890, and second to M. Marguerite Schneider on March 14, 1923. He had three children, Anna May born June 6, 1892, Wilber Thomas, born April 6, 1896, and Lucille, born 1907, all with his first wife. By 1910, Rawleigh was the most prominent citizen of Freeport. Not only did he build his business from the ground up, but he was involved in community service as well as becoming the acting mayor from 1909 to 1911 and later served as a member of the Illinois House of Representatives in 1911 and 1912. He was a presidential elector in 1916. He also was a delegate to the 1932 Republican National Convention.

Through all of his travels, Rawleigh took it upon himself to collect a variety of art forms that, in his opinion, would bring culture back to his hometown. This collection is the basis of what is now the Freeport Art Museum. Rawleigh's premier collection contains pottery from the Pueblo cultures of the Southwest. He has a collection of 19th-century academic masters, a form of European painting. The collection contains an anonymous 17th-century portrait as well as a unique and extensive collection of pietra dura, stone mosaic paintings of the early 20th century, and a series of paintings from the natives of Madagascar. Particular Asian items in the collection include a 19th-century palace screen and a set of Hindu hand painted temple banners, known as kalamkari, from India. His collection also includes sculptures, including 19th-century marbles and bronzes from Italy, France and Belgium, and a 17th-century Spanish polychromed wood statue of St. Anthony of Padua.

Rawleigh died January 23, 1951, in Freeport. He is buried in Oakland Cemetery.
