= Standish Park Arboretum =

Park in Downtown Galesburg, Illinois

Coordinates: 40°56′42″N 90°22′19″W

- Interactive map of Standish Park Arboretum
- Location: 42 W Tompkins St
- Nearest city: Galesburg, Illinois
- Area: 3.3 acres (1.3 ha)

Standish Park Arboretum is a 3.3-acre park located in Downtown Galesburg, Illinois. Located just north of Knox College, Standish Park Arboretum has a collection of 137 trees of 67 different species. The park is used by the Galesburg community for many events such as the annual Art in the Park festival.

Walkways criss-cross the park and along all four sides of its perimeter. A gazebo used to be at the center which served as the focal point. Surrounding the Standish Park Arboretum are sites such as, to the south, Old Main (on the Knox College campus) which was the location of one of the Lincoln-Douglas debates (1858), the Knox County, Illinois Courthouse (erected in 1884–1886) to the east, and the Galesburg City Hall to the north.

== History ==
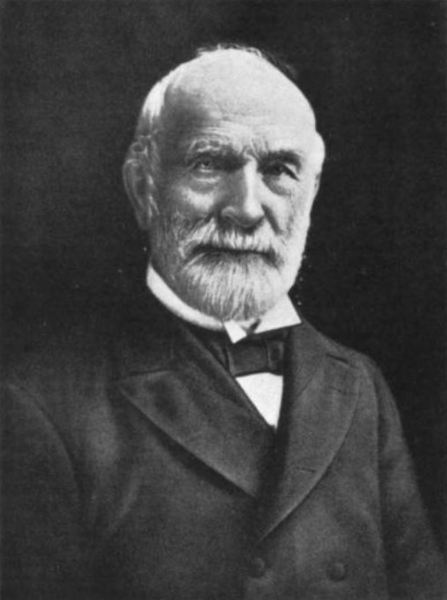
John Van Ness Standish (1825–1919)

Standish Park Arboretum was founded by Dr. John Van Ness Standish, direct descendant of Miles Standish of the Mayflower Colony, in 1873. Dr. Standish was a horticulture specialist and personally oversaw the plantings of 122 trees and 115 shrubs. He was involved with the establishment of the Galesburg Horticultural Society in 1873 and the Park Commission Board in 1876. He helped shape the policy of the park and transformed it into a park of exceeding beauty. He nurtured the park until his death in 1919.

In the 1950s, Knox College classes in advanced taxonomy re-identified and tagged trees. In the 1970s, the Ray Brown Restoration Project set out to identify original trees and shrubs. They planted 37 trees and 6 shrubs in addition to their inventory work. In 1989, the SPRUCE committee (Standish Park Restoration Undertaking with Creative Enthusiasm) formed to replant and nurture Standish Park. As a result of their work, 38 trees and 3 shrubs were planted. In 2003, Standish Park was designated an Arboretum by the Galesburg City Council., and concurrently, the University of Illinois Extension Master Gardener volunteers re-identified the inventory of trees and shrubs in Standish Park Arboretum. Subsequently, the inventory was also re-tagged and efforts are underway to encourage more visitors to the Arboretum.

From 2004 to 2012, the park was used as the site of the Galesburg Scarecrow Festival, an artisan festival and market occurring in the early fall. The park, since 2003, has also been the location for the city's "Art-in-the-park" festival.
