= Quad City Botanical Center =

Set of botanical gardens in Rock Island, Illinois, United States

Coordinates: 41.5098°N 90.5642°W

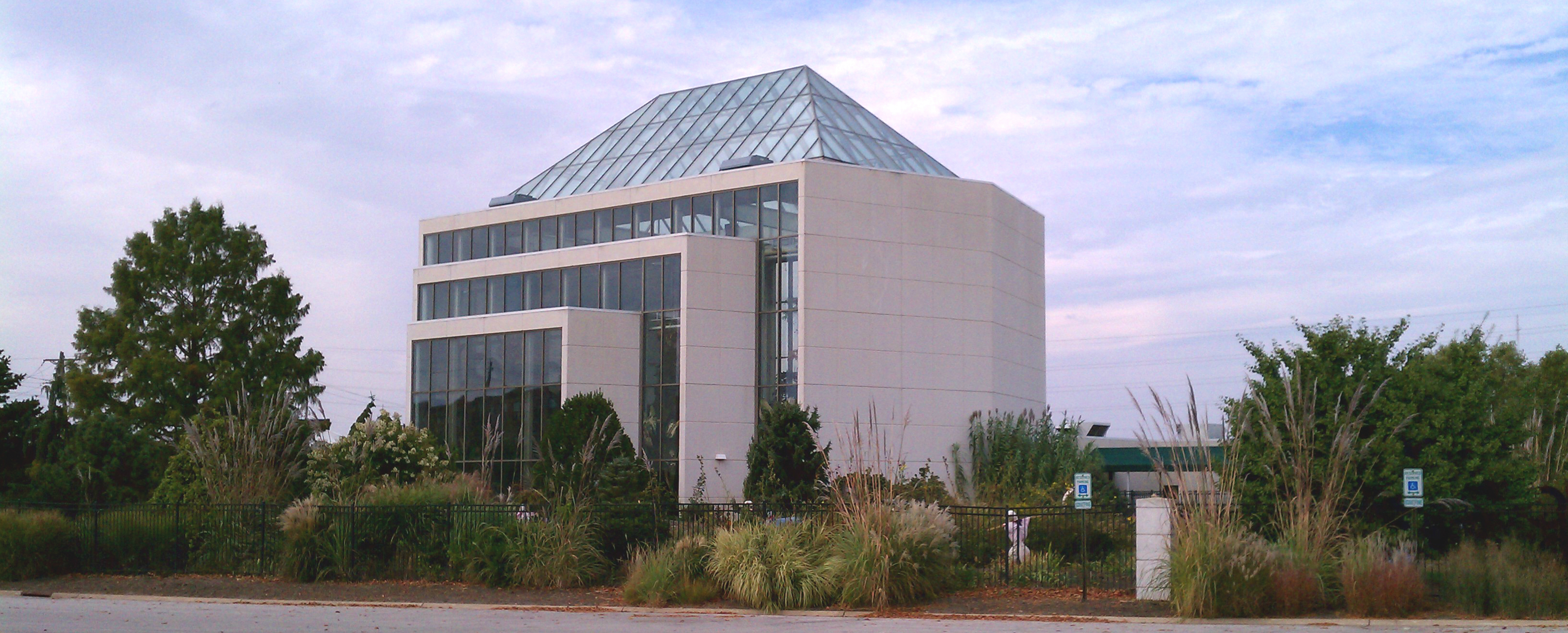
- Interactive map of Quad City Botanical Center
- Website: www.qcgardens.com

The Quad City Botanical Center is a set of botanical gardens located next to the Mississippi River at 2525 4th Avenue, Rock Island, Illinois. The center is open daily except major holidays; an admission fee is charged. The center opened on June 20, 1998.

== Gardens ==
Gardens include:

- Sun Garden conservatory (6,444 square feet) - includes sweet acacia, allspice, arrowhead, bamboo, banana, bird of paradise, bromeliads, cacao, cardamom, cassava, coconut, coffee, ferns, frangipani, Arabian jasmine, lychee, orchids, palms, papaya, papyrus, pineapple, sapodilla, vanilla, and ylang-ylang, as well as a 14-foot (4.3 m) waterfall, reflecting pools with koi, and a 70-foot (21 m) skylight.
- Scott County Regional Authority Conifer Garden (established 2001) - over 40 conifers from the collection of Justin C. Harper, including cultivars such as Ginkgo biloba 'Todd's Broom', Taxus cuspidate 'Fastigiate Aurea', and Thuja standishii.
- Physically Challenged Garden (established July 2003) - planting beds at varying heights for gardeners with physical limitations.
- Scrambled Alphabet Garden - for children.

== Other programs ==
In 2024, the Quad City Botanical Center introduced a mobile Plant Discovery Bus to bring its educational programs and garden to local students.

== See also ==
- List of botanical gardens in the United States
