= Don Opel Arboretum =

Arboretum in Freeport, Illinois

Coordinates: 42.2828°N 89.6733°W

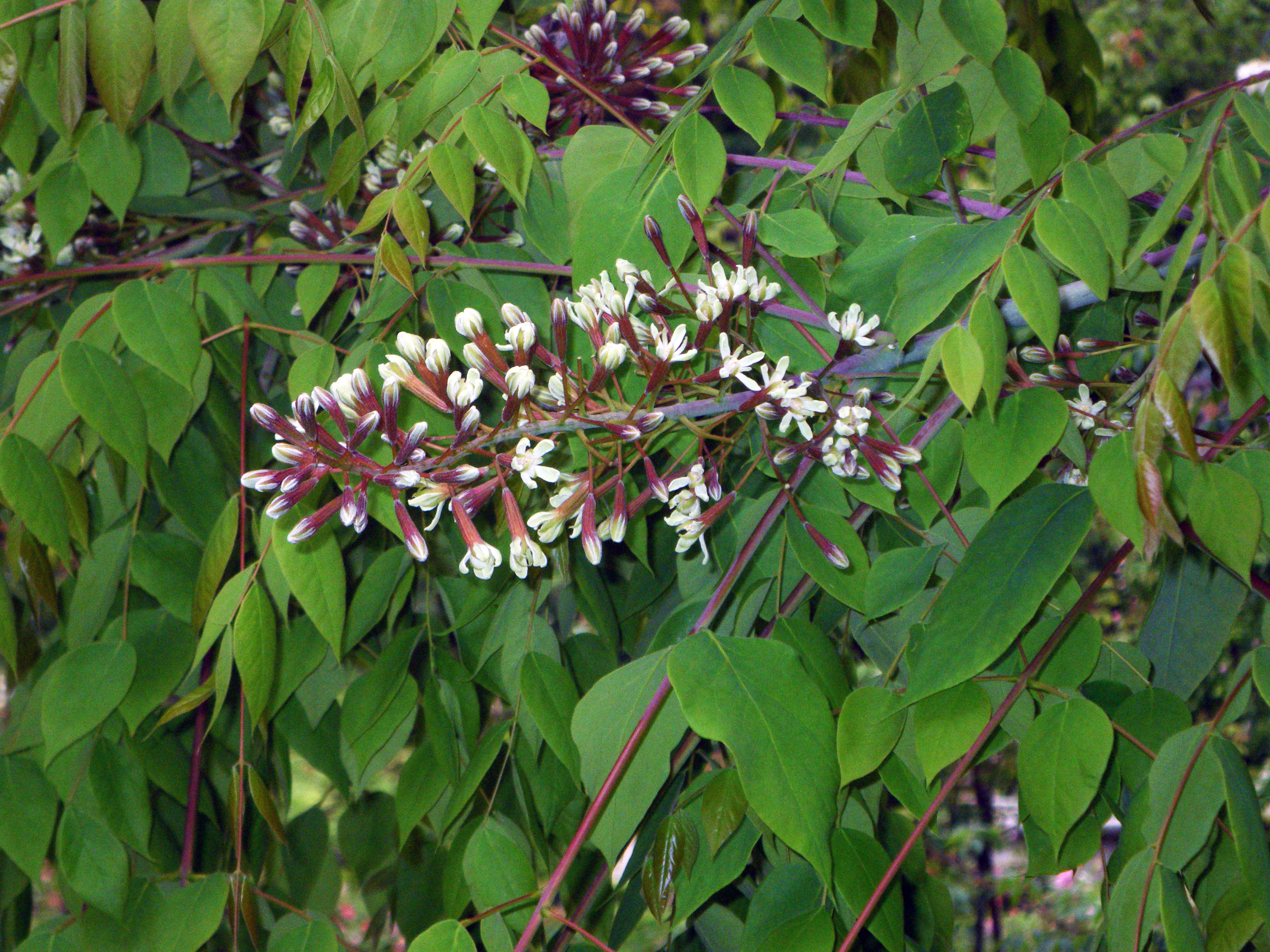
- Don Opel Arboretum
- Interactive map of Don Opel Arboretum
- Location: Highland Community College, 2998 West Pearl City Road
- Nearest city: Freeport, Illinois
- Area: 140-acre (0.57 km^{2})

Don Opel Arboretum is an arboretum located on the 140-acre (0.57 km^{2}) campus of Highland Community College, 2998 West Pearl City Road, Freeport, Illinois.

== See also ==
- List of botanical gardens in the United States
