= George L. Luthy Memorial Botanical Garden =

Botanical garden and conservatory in Peoria, Illinois

Coordinates: 40.7176°N 89.5751°W

Luthy Botanical Garden
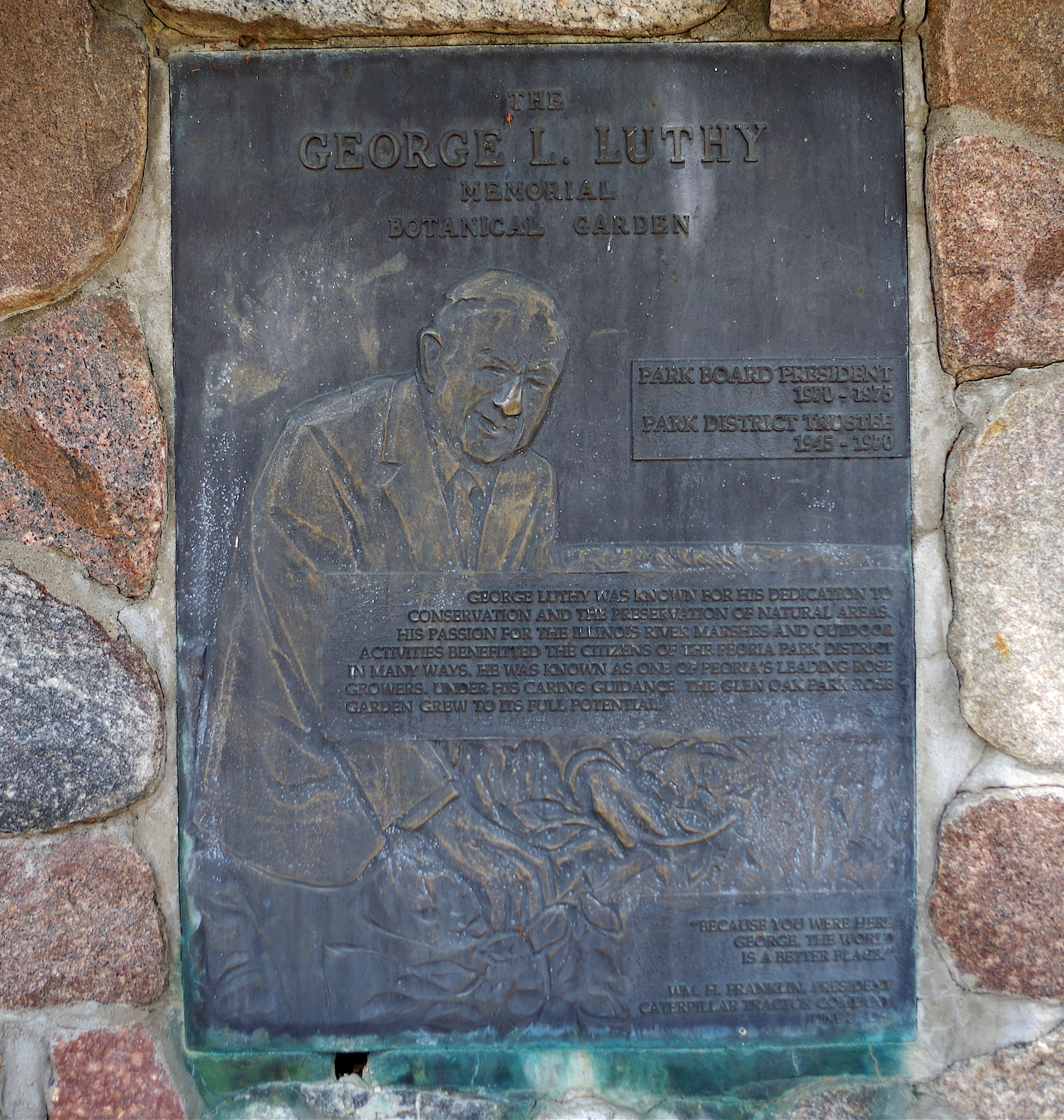
- The George L Luthy memorial, a bronze plaque mounted on a stone wall in the gardens
- Interactive map of Luthy Botanical Garden
- Location: Glen Oak Park
- Nearest city: Peoria, Illinois
- Area: 5 acres (2.0 ha)
- Created: 1951
- Operator: Peoria Park District
- Open: 10 am-5 pm, daily
- Public transit: CityLink route #12
- Website: Official website

Luthy Botanical Garden is a 5 acres (2.0 ha) botanical garden and conservatory located in Glen Oak Park, near the corner of Prospect Avenue and Gift Avenue in Peoria, Illinois, United States.

== History ==
The garden was established in 1951. It is named after George Littlewood Luthy, who was president of Peoria's Commercial National Bank (now part of PNC Bank) and a Trustee of the Peoria Park District, which owns the garden.

The garden is a member of the American Public Garden Association (APGA).

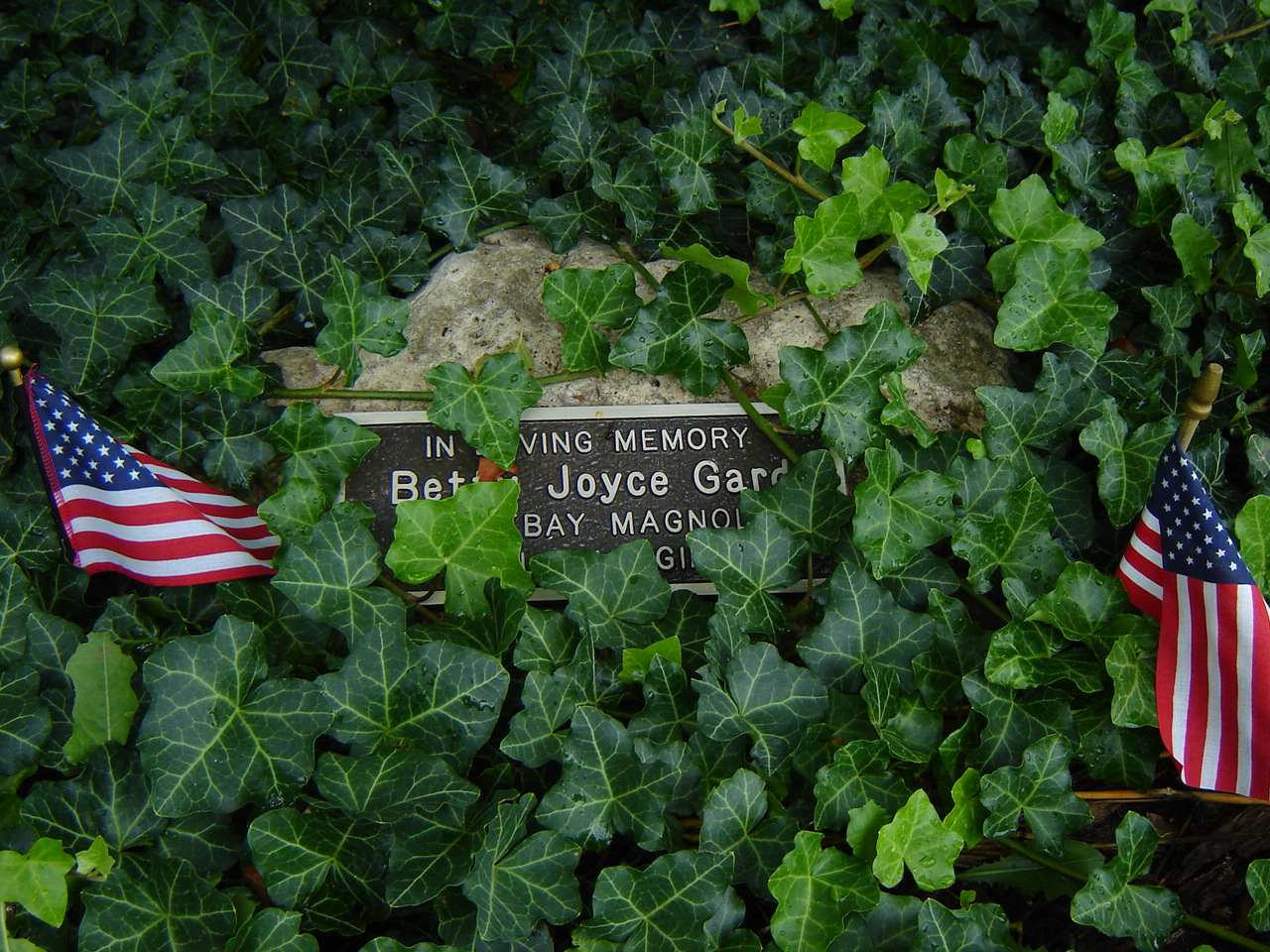
Another memorial tablet, half hidden by ivy

== Flora ==
The garden now contains more than 300 genera, with an emphasis on roses, perennials, annuals, hosta, hemerocallis, and herbs.

=== Gardens ===
Luthy Botanical Garden has 15 themed gardens. Specific gardens include an all-season garden, herb garden, perennial garden, rose garden, viburnum collection, wildlife garden, and woodland garden. Native prairie grass and wildflowers are also on display.

=== Conservatory ===
The conservatory is 2,500 square feet (230 m^{2}) and features tropical plants, orchids, and seasonal displays.

=== Shows ===
==== Annual shows and events ====
Show	Est.	Month(s)	Host(s)	Ref
Lily Show		March–April		
Spring Plant Sale		late April		
Orchid Show	1966	May (Mother's Day)	Peoria Orchid Society	
Hosta Garden Walk		June	Central Illinois Hosta Society	
Mum (Chrysanthemum) Show		mid-October to November		
Poinsettia Show and Candlelight Walks	1951	December		

==== Other shows ====
- The Classic Garish Garden Show, 2005–2010 in February, featuring lawn flamingos, garden gnomes, and toilet fountains

It is open daily. Garden admission is free; a fee is charged for the conservatory.

== See also ==
- List of botanical gardens in the United States
