= Stephen A. Rigney =

American politician

Stephen Ahern Rigney (August 22, 1870 – March 25, 1947) was an American farmer and politician.

Rigney was born near Red Oak, Illinois, Stephenson County, Illinois. He went to the Red Oak public schools and to Northern Illinois University. Rigney also went to business school in Dixon, Illinois. He was a farmer in Red Oak. Rigney served on the Stephenson County Board of Supervisors and was a Republican. He served in the Illinois House of Representatives, from Red Oak, in 1909 and 1910. He was also involved with the conservation department and then lived in Freeport, Illinois. Rigney died at a hospital in Freeport, Illinois.
