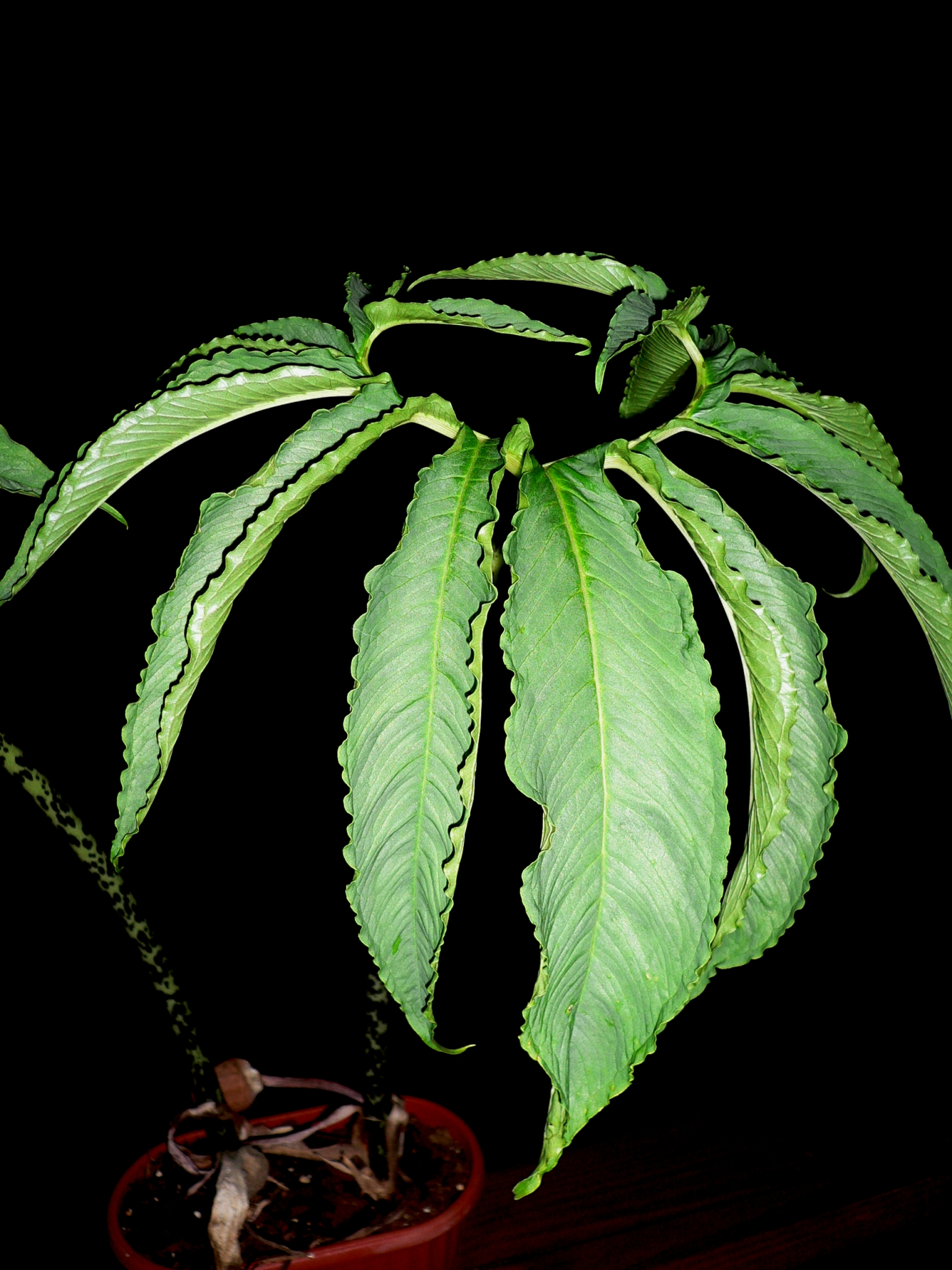
- Sauromatum venosum

Scientific classification
- Kingdom: Plantae
- Clade: Tracheophytes
- Clade: Angiosperms
- Clade: Monocots
- Order: Alismatales
- Family: Araceae
- Subfamily: Aroideae
- Tribe: Areae
- Genus: Sauromatum; Schott

Synonyms
- Diversiarum J.Murata & Ohi-Toma; Hirsutiarum J.Murata & Ohi-Toma; Pedatyphonium J.Murata & Ohi-Toma

= Sauromatum =

Genus of flowering plants

Sauromatum is a genus of flowering plants in the family Araceae. The genus is native to tropical Africa, tropical Asia, and the Arabian Peninsula. Their inflorescences last for only a few hours to a day and give off an unpleasant smell. The inflorescence disperses its odor by heating up.

Species

- Sauromatum brevipes (Hook.f.) N.E.Br. - Tibet, Nepal, Bhutan, Assam
- Sauromatum brevipilosum (Hett. & Sizemore) Cusimano & Hett. - Sumatra
- Sauromatum diversifolium (Wall. ex Schott) Cusimano & Hett. - eastern Himalayas, Tibet, Sichuan, Yunnan, Nepal, Bhutan, Assam, Myanmar, Cambodia
- Sauromatum gaoligongense J.C.Wang & H.Li - Yunnan
- Sauromatum giganteum (Engl.) Cusimano & Hett. - Anhui, Gansu, Hebei, Henan, Jilin, Liaoning, Shandong, Shanxi, Sichuan, Tibet
- Sauromatum hirsutum (S.Y.Hu) Cusimano & Hett. - Yunnan, Laos, Thailand, Vietnam
- Sauromatum horsfieldii Miq. - Guangxi, Guizhou, Sichuan, Yunnan, Laos, Myanmar, Thailand, Vietnam, Sumatra, Java, Bali
- Sauromatum tentaculatum (Hett.) Cusimano & Hett. - Thailand
- Sauromatum venosum (Dryand. ex Aiton) Kunth - tropical Africa from Ethiopia south to Mozambique and west to Cameroon; Yemen, Saudi Arabia; Indian Subcontinent; Myanmar; Tibet, Yunnan

== Gallery ==
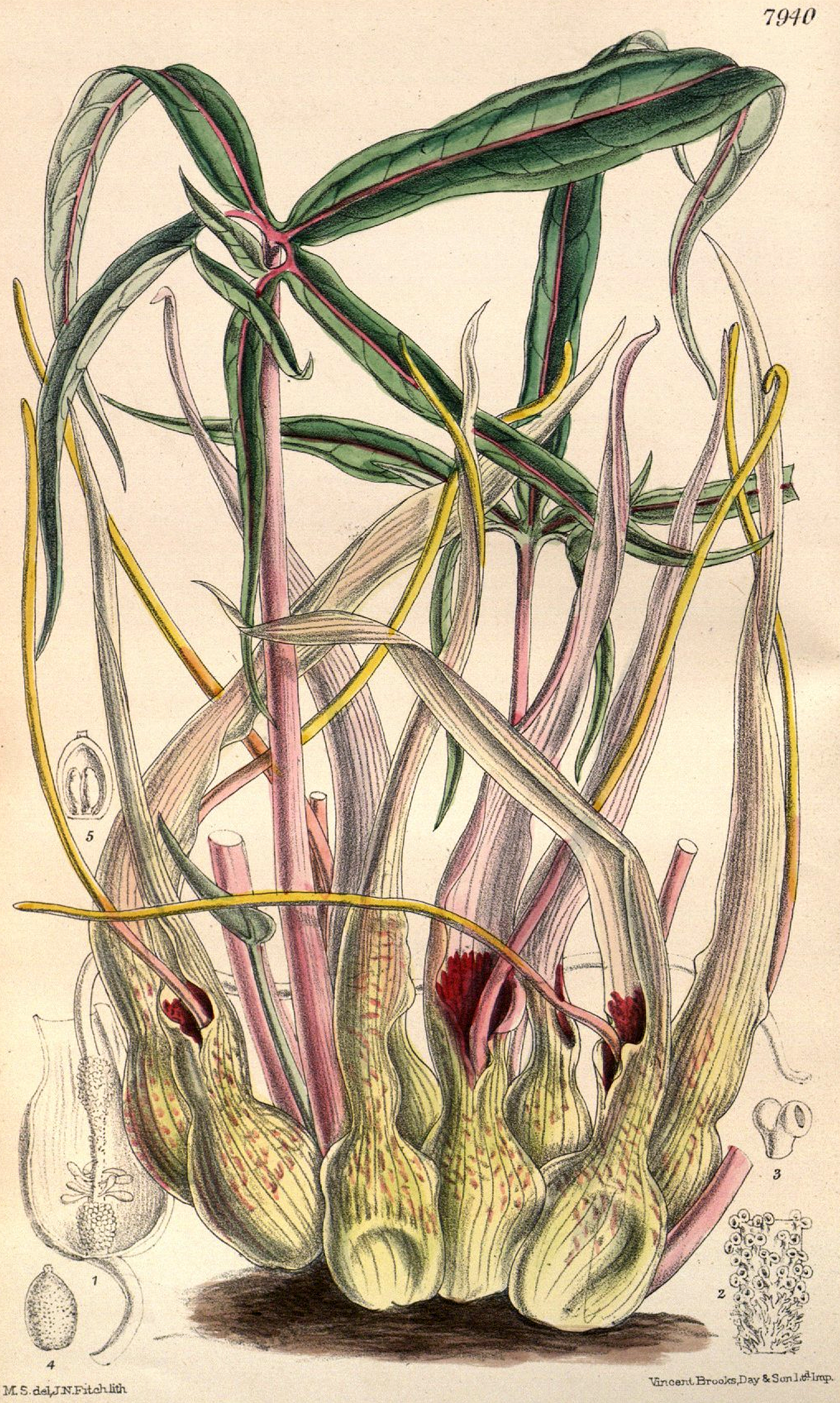
S. brevipes

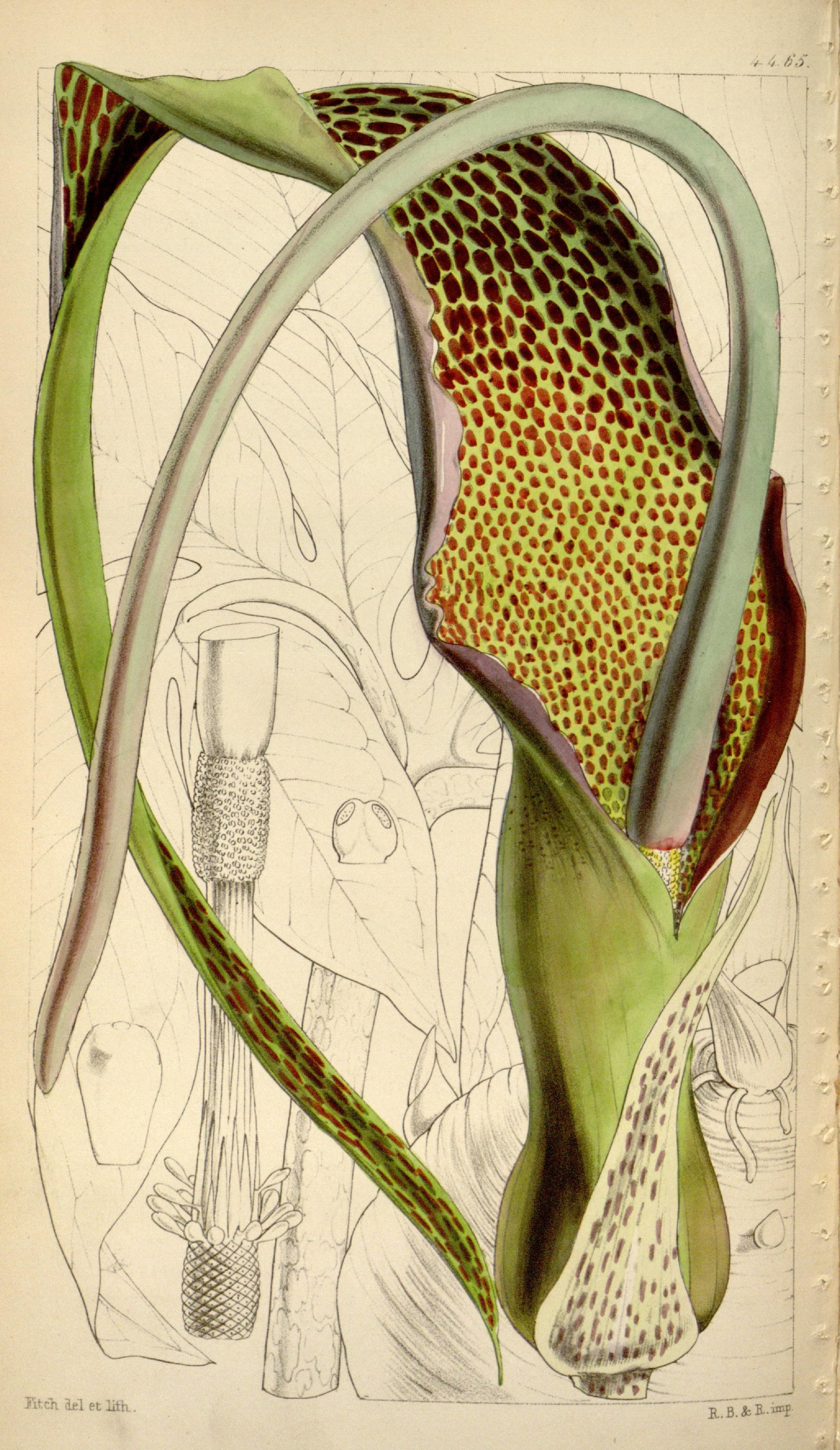
S. venosum
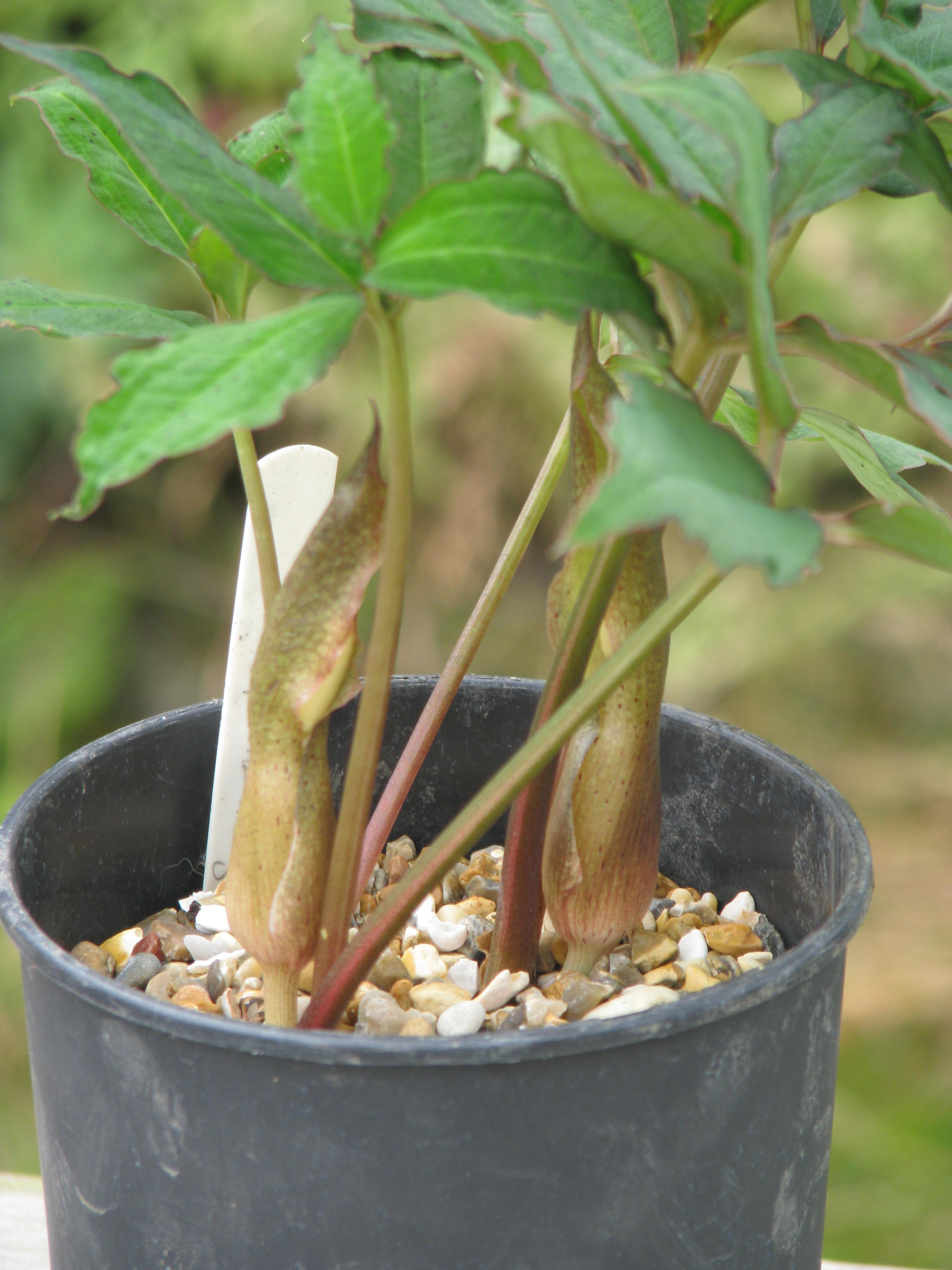
S. horsfieldii

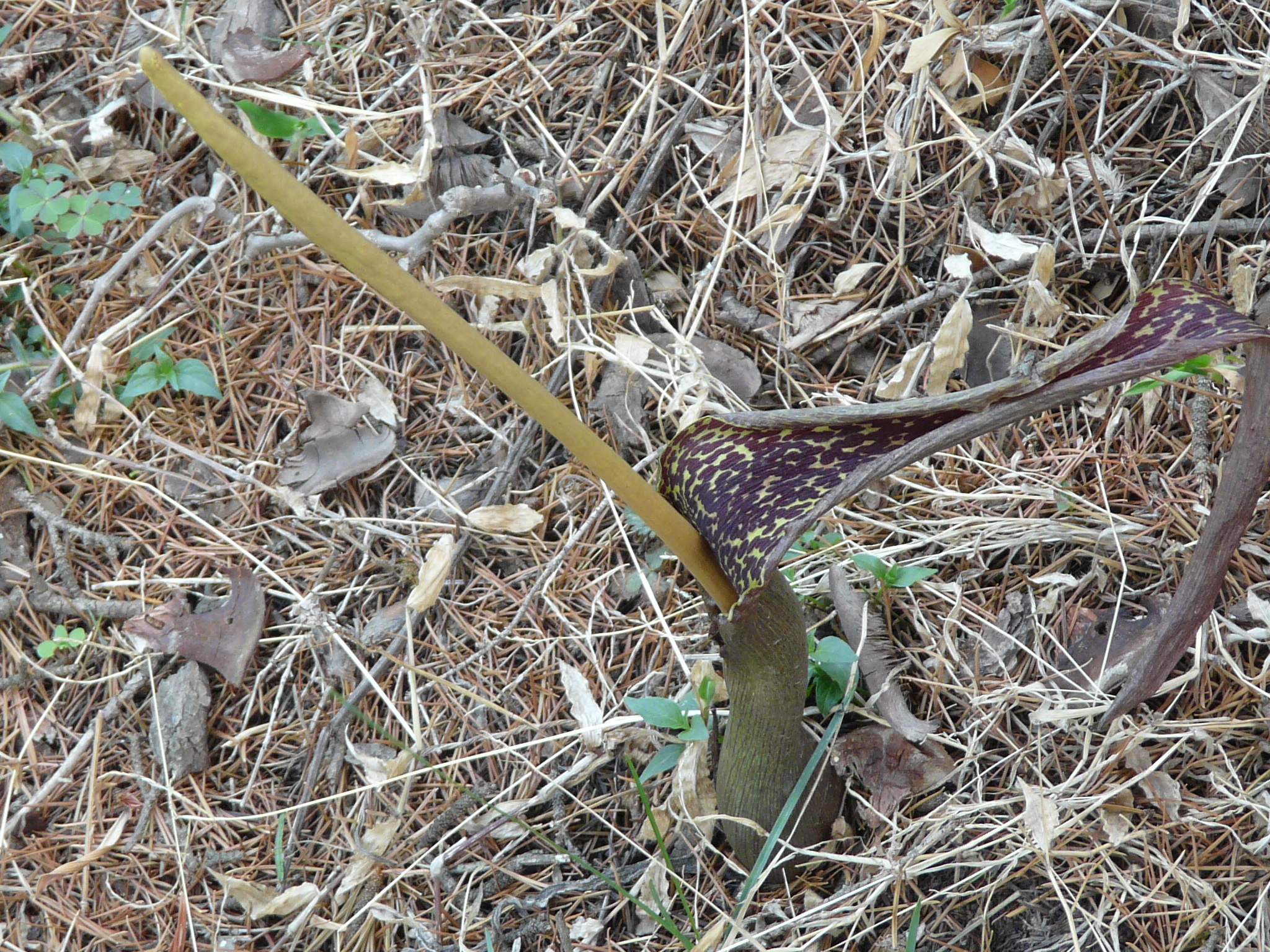
S. venosum
