= Highland Community College (Illinois) =

Community college in Freeport, Illinois, U.S.

- Type: Community college
- Established: 1962; 64 years ago
- Affiliations: Higher Learning Commission
- Endowment: $11.15 million (2025)
- President: Jamal Scott
- Faculty: 190
- Students: 1,861
- Location: Freeport, Illinois, United States; 42.2828°N 89.6733°W
- Campus: Rural, 140 acres/56.6 ha
- Colors: Orange
- Mascot: Cougar
- Website: www.highland.edu

Highland Community College is a public community college in Freeport, Illinois. The college is recognized by the Illinois Community College Board and accredited by the Higher Learning Commission.

== History ==
Highland was first established in 1962 on the land purchased from the Taft family. The Highland Community college foundation was the first community college foundation established in the State of Illinois and only the second in the nation. The foundation was established by Dr. Howard D. Sims, president of Highland Community College from 1975 to 1980.

=== Timeline ===
- 1955 State survey completed by the University of Illinois showed Freeport, Illinois was a logical location for a junior college. A legal requirement in preparation for a referendum was satisfied.
- 1957-1959 State legislation passed allowing public junior colleges to charge tuition.
- 1959 Public defeated a referendum that would have included space for the college in the remodeled high school.
- 1961 Referendum passed by a 3-1 margin calling for the establishment of a comprehensive community college.
- 1962 229 students began evening classes held at the Freeport Senior High School.
- 1964 $150,000 was raised for the Acres of Education campaign to purchase the Taft farm land.
- 1966 Referendum held in 15 districts established an area college district. Facilities were rented and classes were held on Stephenson, Main, Locust, and West Ave. The first board was elected.
- 1967 District 519 was officially established. Ken Borland was hired as the first president. A contest was held to name the college with "Highland" being chosen from among the submissions.
- 1968 Voters approved a plan for the current campus.
- 1970 Five temporary buildings were occupied on the permanent campus.
- 1971 The first permanent facilities were occupied on the current campus.
- 1973 Foundation approves $45,000 grant to the college for the Festival of Arts.
- 1976 Phase III of the building program approved. Work began on the physical fitness education facility to be used jointly by Highland and the YMCA.

== Campus ==
=== Main campus ===
Highland is located in Freeport, Illinois on 140 acres (or 56.6 ha). There are seven buildings on the campus, which are mainly used for classes. The college's sports complex is also the local YMCA, to which Highland's students who are carrying 12 or more credit hours a semester can receive a free membership.

=== Highland West ===
Highland Community College had a campus in Elizabeth, Illinois. On Route 20, Highland West offered residents of Jo Daviess county an easy commute to classes. Several classes could also be taken in Savanna, Illinois. The off-site campuses mainly offered general education courses. In 2007, the Elizabeth campus started offering a Certified Nurse Assistant course. In a cost-cutting measure, the Elizabeth facility was closed in 2014.

== See also ==
- Illinois Community College System
- List of community colleges in Illinois
- Don Opel Arboretum
