= Ron Lawfer =

American politician

Irvin Ronald "Ron" Lawfer (born May 15, 1934 – December 18, 2016) was an American farmer and politician.

== Background ==
Born in Stockton, Illinois, Lawfer served in the United States Army in Korea, He then received his bachelor's degree from University of Illinois. He was a grain, beef, and dairy farmer. He served as a county board member for Jo Daviess County, Illinois and in the Wards Grove Township, Jo Daviess County, Illinois. Lawfer then served in the Illinois House of Representatives from 1992 to 2002 as a Republican.
