= Freeport, Illinois =

- City
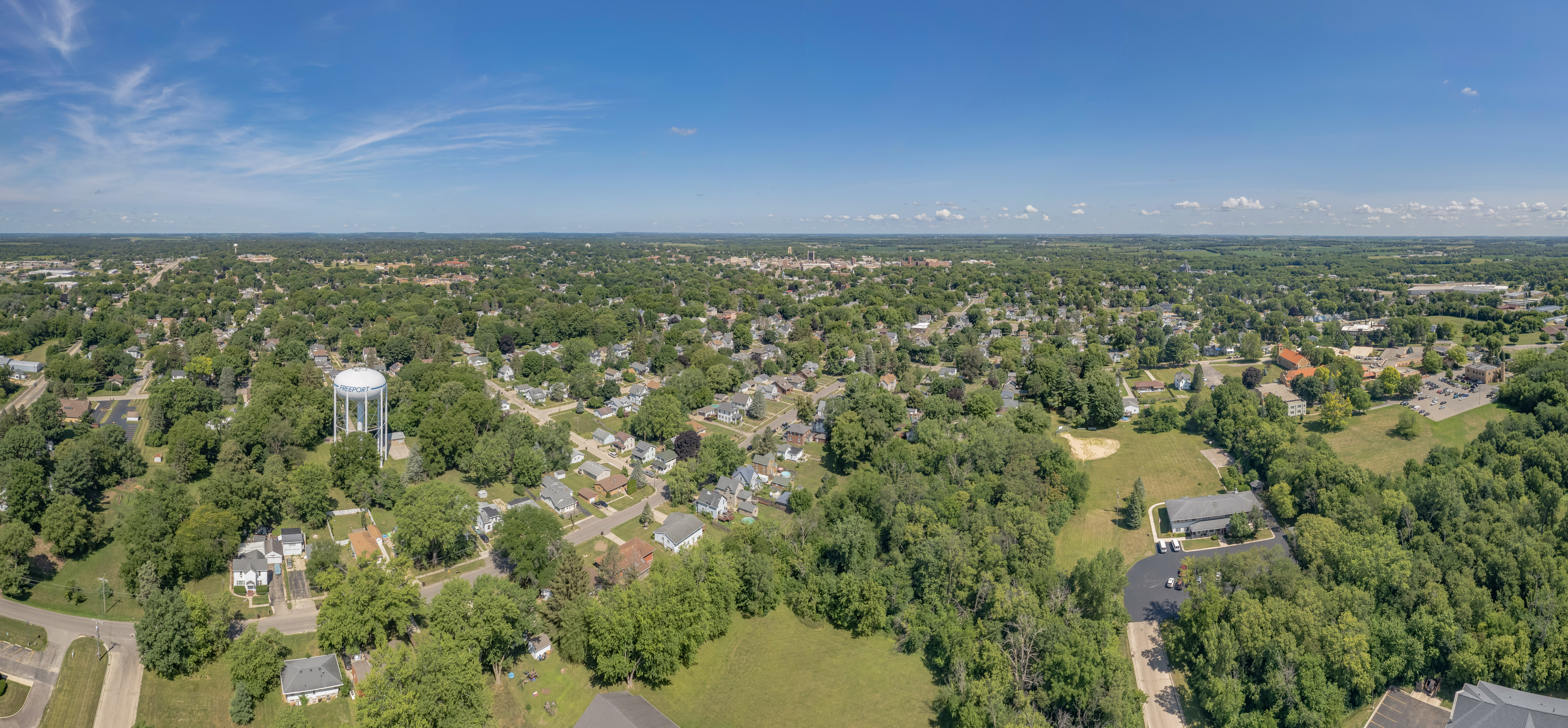
- Aerial view of Freeport
- Nickname: Pretzel City, USA
- Interactive map of Freeport, Illinois
- Location within Illinois Location within the United States
- Coordinates: 42°17′15″N 89°37′40″W
- Country: United States
- State: Illinois
- County: Stephenson
- Township: Freeport
- Founded: 1827
- Incorporated: 1838

Government
  - Mayor: Jodi Miller

Area
  - Total: 11.89 sq mi (30.79 km^{2})
  - Land: 11.88 sq mi (30.77 km^{2})
  - Water: 0.0077 sq mi (0.02 km^{2})
- Elevation: 791 ft (241 m)

Population (2020)
  - Total: 23,973
  - Density: 2,017.7/sq mi (779.04/km^{2})
- Time zone: UTC-6 (CST)
  - Summer (DST): UTC-5 (CDT)
- ZIP Codes: 61032, 61033, 61034
- Area code: 815/779
- FIPS code: 17-27884
- GNIS feature ID: 2394821
- Website: www.cityoffreeport.org

Freeport is the largest city in Stephenson County, Illinois, United States, and its county seat. The population was 23,973 at the 2020 census. Located along the Pecatonica River, Freeport is known for hosting the second Lincoln–Douglas debate of 1858, and as "Pretzel City, USA", due to a popular German bakery that became known for its prolific pretzel production in the 19th century. Freeport High School's mascot is the Pretzel to honor its heritage.

== History ==
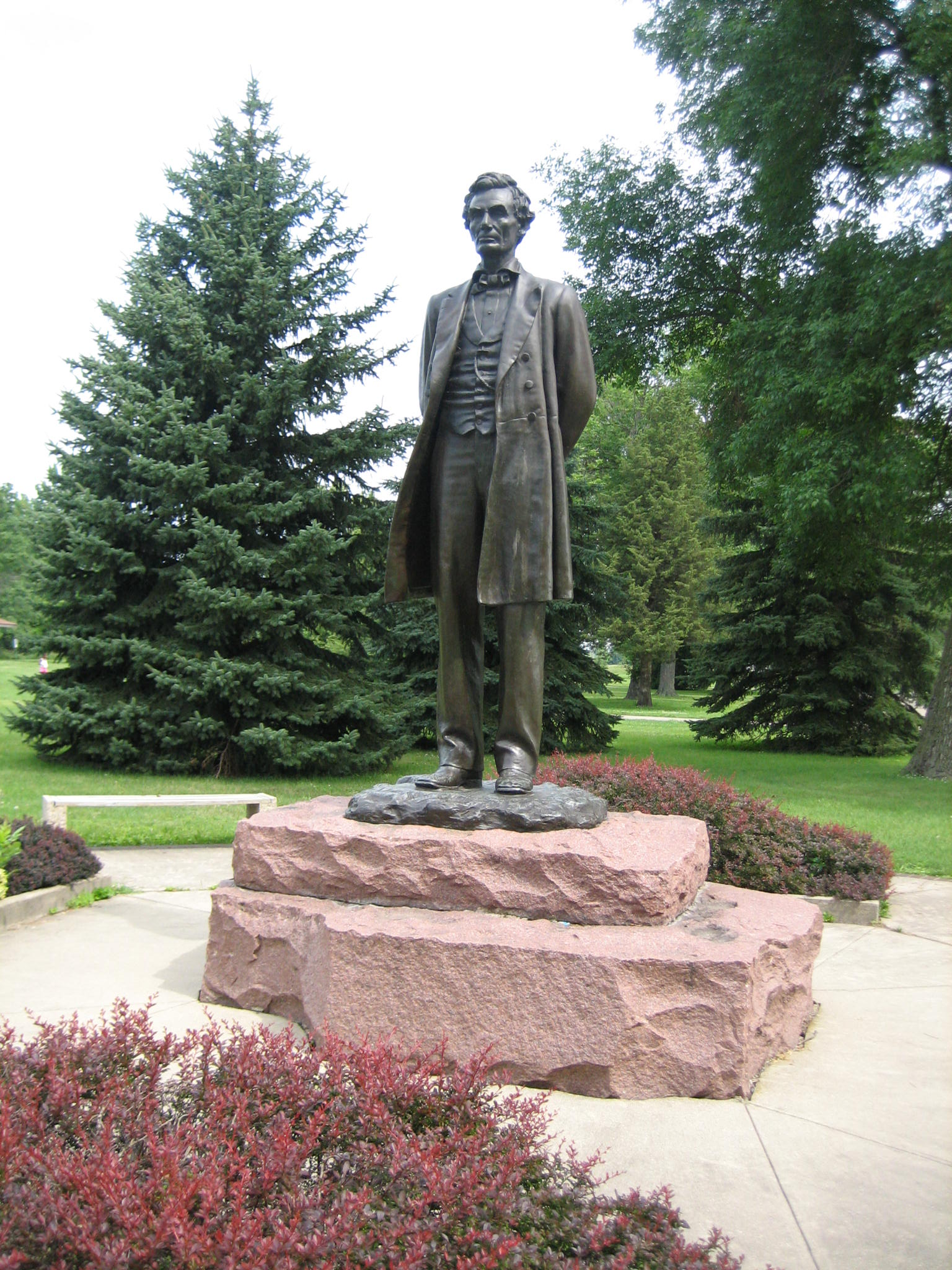
Lincoln the Debater by sculptor Leonard Crunelle, in Taylor Park

The community was originally called Winneshiek. When it was incorporated, the new municipality took its name from the generosity of Tutty Baker, who was credited with running a "free port" on the Pecatonica River. The name "Winneshiek" was later adopted, and is preserved to this day, by the Freeport Community Theatre Group. In 1837, Stephenson County was formed, and Freeport became its seat of government in 1838. Linked by a stagecoach with Chicago, the community grew rapidly. In 1840, a frame courthouse was erected and the first school was founded. Within two years, Freeport had two newspapers, and in 1853, the two were joined by a third, which was published in German. By then, the community had a population of 2,000.

On August 27, 1858, the second debate between Abraham Lincoln and Stephen A. Douglas took place in Freeport and gave the nation direction in the following years. Although Stephen Douglas won the election and retained his U.S. Senate seat, his reply to a question on slavery alienated the South, which called it the "Freeport Heresy", and split the Democratic Party. This enabled Abraham Lincoln to win the 1860 United States presidential election. A monument to the debate was dedicated in 1903 by President Theodore Roosevelt and stands at this site. A life-size statue recreating the event was dedicated in 1992. Another renowned statue, Lincoln the Debator by Leonard Crunelle, is a focal point in the city's Taylor Park. In many years, there is also a reenactment of the debate, which has been shown on C-SPAN.

Freeport is known as the "Pretzel City", and its public high school's team is named the Pretzels. The nickname is a reminder of Freeport's ethnic heritage: in the late 1850s, many German migrants, both from Pennsylvania and from Europe, resettled in Stephenson County, bringing with them their love of pretzel snacks. In 1869, a German immigrant named John Billerbeck established the Billerbeck Bakery, which distributed so many pretzels to residents that the local newspaper later dubbed Freeport the "Pretzel City". The city later capitalized on this nickname in 2003 by starting Freeport's first Pretzel Festival.

Before February 1893, a large square of land was purchased from the former Keller-Wittbecker farm in East Freeport. Some of this land had been subdivided and platted as the "Arcade Addition", as Arcade Manufacturing used some of that square of land in 1893 to rebuild its factory after a fire in its original location had destroyed everything. The Arcade Manufacturing Company had been in operation since 1885 when the previous Novelty Iron Works had gone out of business at the corner of Chicago and Jackson streets. That earlier company began as early as 1868. After the 1892 fire, the Arcade Manufacturing Company built an entirely new factory in the Arcade Addition of East Freeport, where they produced coffee mills and other metal products.

Freeport is home to the oldest Carnegie Library in Illinois and one of the first Carnegie Libraries designed by the Chicago architectural firm of Patton and Miller. It was renovated into Freeport's city hall and city offices were moved to Carnegie City Hall in February 2017.

Freeport transitioned to the city manager form of government in May 2017.

== Geography ==
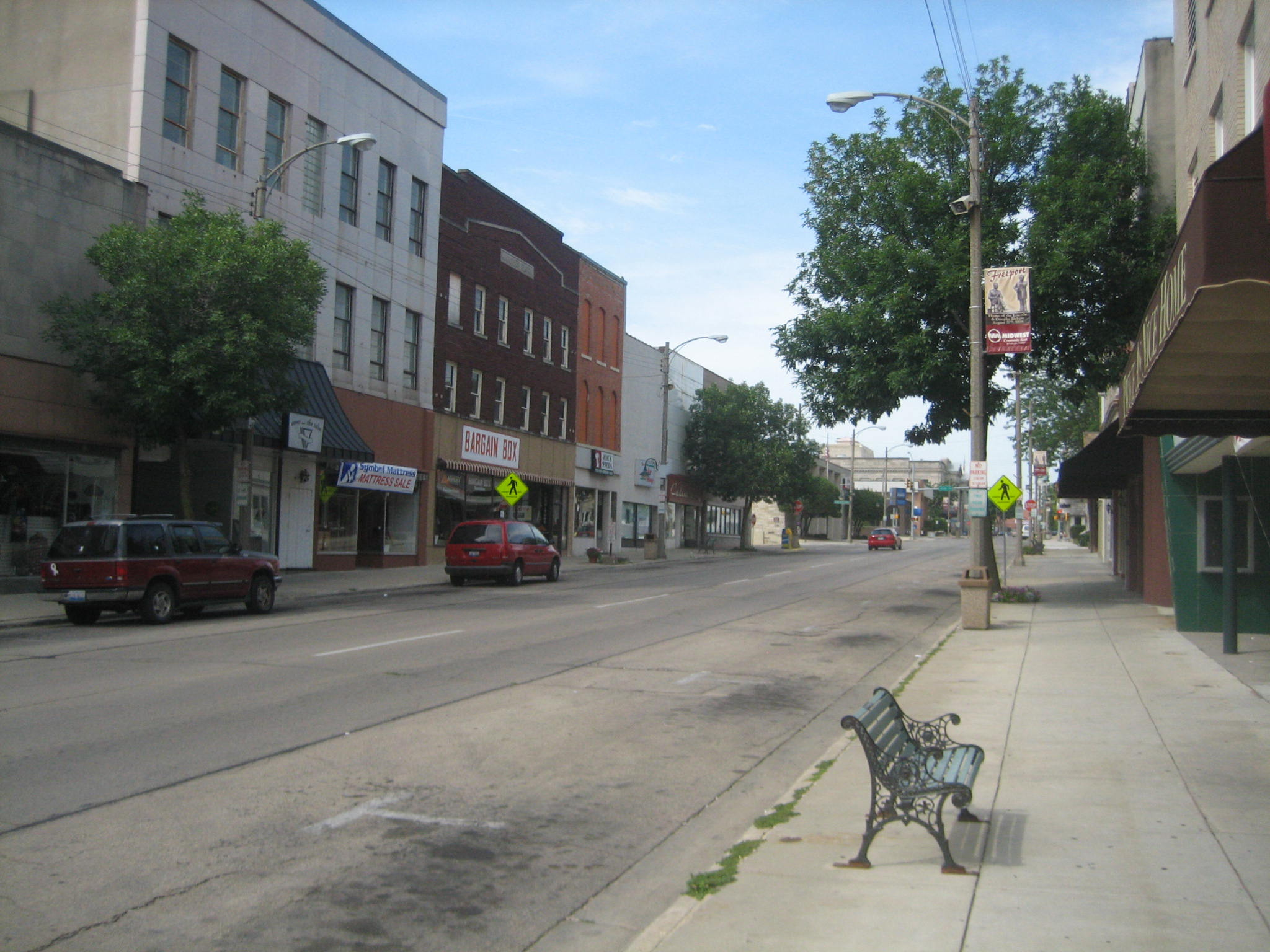
Buildings in downtown Freeport, Illinois

Freeport is at the center of a large agricultural area, located approximately 20 miles (32 km) south of the Wisconsin state line, 25 miles (40 km) west of Rockford, and 114 miles (183 km) northwest of Chicago. The Pecatonica River and Yellow Creek flow through the city. According to the U.S. Census Bureau, the city has a total area of 11.89 square miles (30.8 km^{2}), of which 11.88 square miles (30.8 km^{2}) is land and 0.01 square miles (0.026 km^{2}) is water.

The area code for Freeport is 815 with an overlay area code of 815/779.

=== Climate and flooding ===
The Pecatonica River has flooded Freeport seven times since May 2017. The necessary flood cleanup has cost the city more than $1.5 million.

The frequency of severe weather events appears to be increasing. According to the State Climatologist, "the number of days Freeport has experienced heavy rainfall has steadily increased every decade since 1949." The city is seeking funding to buy out homes in flood-prone neighborhoods. One study estimates that for "every $1 communities like Freeport spend to relocate their residents they will save $6 in future clean ups."

Climate data for Freeport, Illinois (1991–2020 normals, extremes 1973–present)
Month	Jan	Feb	Mar	Apr	May	Jun	Jul	Aug	Sep	Oct	Nov	Dec	Year
Record high °F (°C)	61 (16)	69 (21)	85 (29)	92 (33)	96 (36)	100 (38)	103 (39)	101 (38)	96 (36)	90 (32)	77 (25)	67 (19)	103 (39)
Mean daily maximum °F (°C)	27.9 (−2.3)	32.6 (0.3)	44.9 (7.2)	58.2 (14.6)	69.9 (21.1)	79.3 (26.3)	82.4 (28.0)	80.7 (27.1)	74.3 (23.5)	61.5 (16.4)	46.0 (7.8)	33.3 (0.7)	57.6 (14.2)
Daily mean °F (°C)	19.6 (−6.9)	23.7 (−4.6)	35.4 (1.9)	47.3 (8.5)	59.1 (15.1)	69.0 (20.6)	72.4 (22.4)	70.3 (21.3)	62.6 (17.0)	50.4 (10.2)	37.1 (2.8)	25.6 (−3.6)	47.7 (8.7)
Mean daily minimum °F (°C)	11.3 (−11.5)	14.8 (−9.6)	25.8 (−3.4)	36.4 (2.4)	48.4 (9.1)	58.6 (14.8)	62.3 (16.8)	59.9 (15.5)	51.0 (10.6)	39.3 (4.1)	28.2 (−2.1)	17.9 (−7.8)	37.8 (3.2)
Record low °F (°C)	−31 (−35)	−31 (−35)	−19 (−28)	9 (−13)	25 (−4)	38 (3)	46 (8)	40 (4)	28 (−2)	15 (−9)	−5 (−21)	−23 (−31)	−31 (−35)
Average precipitation inches (mm)	1.58 (40)	1.65 (42)	2.15 (55)	3.66 (93)	4.36 (111)	5.26 (134)	4.21 (107)	4.21 (107)	4.11 (104)	2.98 (76)	2.36 (60)	1.83 (46)	38.36 (974)
Average snowfall inches (cm)	9.7 (25)	8.5 (22)	3.8 (9.7)	0.8 (2.0)	0.0 (0.0)	0.0 (0.0)	0.0 (0.0)	0.0 (0.0)	0.0 (0.0)	0.2 (0.51)	2.6 (6.6)	8.9 (23)	34.5 (88)
Average precipitation days (≥ 0.01 in)	8.7	8.0	9.4	10.7	13.1	11.7	9.8	9.7	9.0	9.4	8.1	8.7	116.3
Average snowy days (≥ 0.1 in)	6.0	5.0	2.9	0.6	0.0	0.0	0.0	0.0	0.0	0.1	1.2	5.0	20.8
Source: NOAA

== Demographics ==
Historical population
Census	Pop.	Note	%±
1840	491		—
1850	1,436		192.5%
1860	5,376		274.4%
1870	7,889		46.7%
1880	8,516		7.9%
1890	10,189		19.6%
1900	13,258		30.1%
1910	17,587		32.7%
1920	19,669		11.8%
1930	22,045		12.1%
1940	22,368		1.5%
1950	22,467		0.4%
1960	26,628		18.5%
1970	27,736		4.2%
1980	26,266		−5.3%
1990	25,840		−1.6%
2000	26,443		2.3%
2010	25,638		−3.0%
2020	23,973		−6.5%
Census Quickfacts

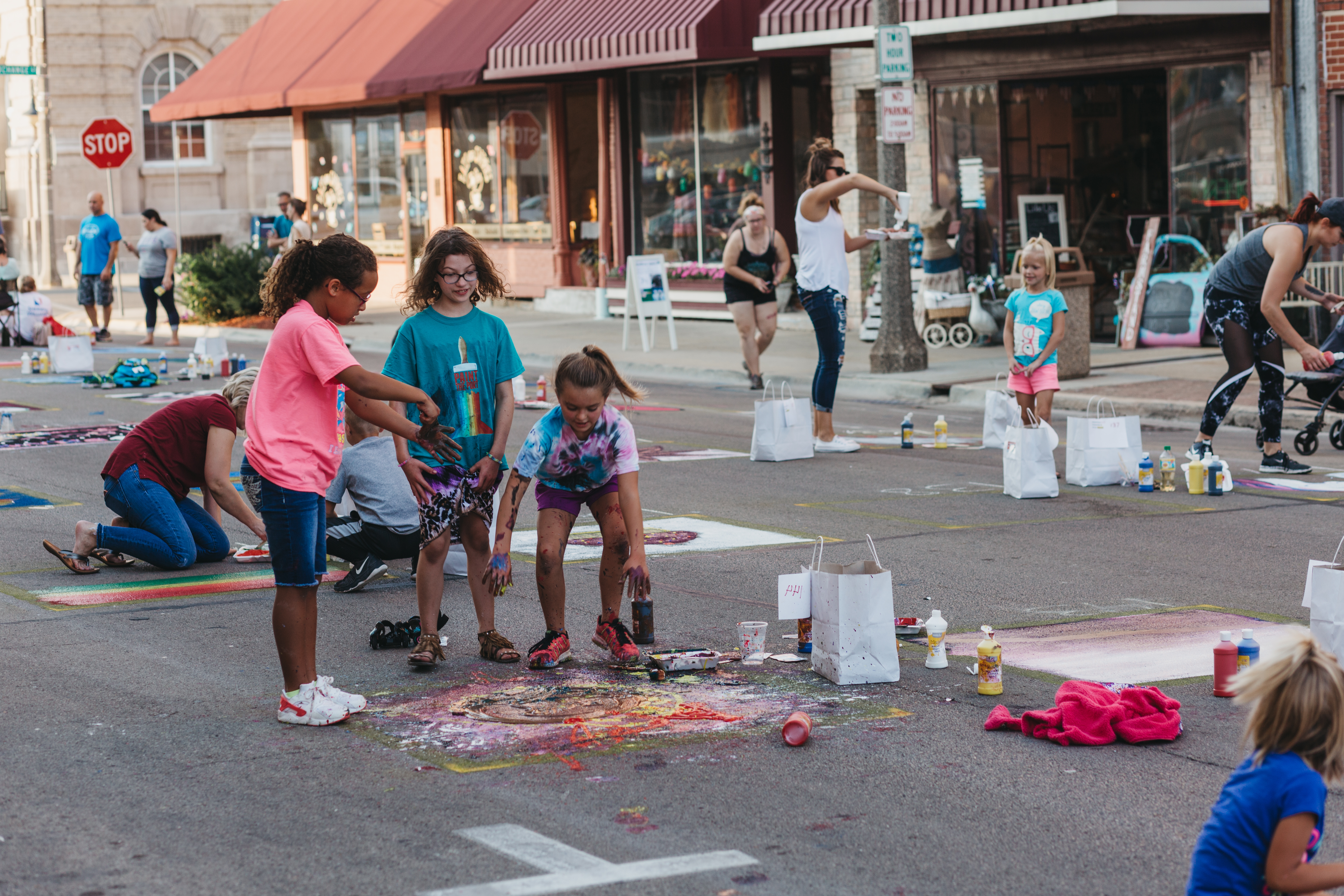
Paint the Port is an annual festival in Downtown Freeport held in August and hosted by the Freeport Art Museum.

=== 2020 census ===
As of the 2020 census, Freeport had a population of 23,973 and a population density of 2,017.8 inhabitants per square mile (779.1/km^{2}). The median age was 43.7 years; 21.7% of residents were under the age of 18 and 23.2% were 65 years of age or older. For every 100 females there were 89.0 males, and for every 100 females age 18 and over there were 85.6 males.

98.5% of residents lived in urban areas, while 1.5% lived in rural areas.

There were 10,528 households in Freeport, of which 24.7% had children under the age of 18 living in them. Of all households, 34.7% were married-couple households, 21.5% were households with a male householder and no spouse or partner present, and 35.8% were households with a female householder and no spouse or partner present. About 38.3% of all households were made up of individuals and 17.6% had someone living alone who was 65 years of age or older.

There were 11,888 housing units, at an average density of 1,000.6 per square mile (386.3/km^{2}); 11.4% were vacant. The homeowner vacancy rate was 2.9% and the rental vacancy rate was 10.9%.

Racial composition as of the 2020 census
Race	Number	Percent
White	16,520	68.9%
Black or African American	4,303	17.9%
American Indian and Alaska Native	87	0.4%
Asian	246	1.0%
Native Hawaiian and Other Pacific Islander	9	0.0%
Some other race	697	2.9%
Two or more races	2,111	8.8%
Hispanic or Latino (of any race)	1,693	7.1%

=== 2000 census ===
As of the census of 2000, there were 26,443 people, 11,222 households, and 6,845 families residing in the city. The population density was 2,316.9 inhabitants per square mile (894.6/km^{2}). There were 12,471 housing units at an average density of 1,092.7 per square mile (421.9/km^{2}). The racial makeup of the city was 81.77% White, 13.81% African American, 0.19% Native American, 0.97% Asian, 0.04% Pacific Islander, 1.00% from other races, and 2.22% from two or more races. Hispanic or Latino of any race were 2.12% of the population.

There were 11,222 households, out of which 28.4% had children under the age of 18 living with them, 45.1% were married couples living together, 12.6% had a female householder with no husband present, and 39.0% were non-families. 33.7% of all households were made up of individuals, and 15.1% had someone living alone who was 65 years of age or older. The average household size was 2.29 and the average family size was 2.93.

In the city, the population was spread out, with 24.5% under the age of 18, 8.5% from 18 to 24, 27.8% from 25 to 44, 21.2% from 45 to 64, and 18.1% who were 65 years of age or older. The median age was 38 years. For every 100 females, there were 87.1 males. For every 100 females age 18 and over, there were 83.8 males.

The median income for a household in the city was $35,399, and the median income for a family was $43,787. Males had a median income of $35,870 versus $25,095 for females. The per capita income for the city was $18,680. About 9.9% of families and 13.1% of the population were below the poverty line, including 18.6% of those under age 18 and 9.5% of those age 65 or over.

== Economy ==
Tourist sites in the area include the Don Opel Arboretum, a botanical garden with over 3,000 different species of ground coverings, trees and shrubs. The Stephenson County Historical Society Museum includes Oscar Taylor House, a one-room schoolhouse, the Industrial/Arcade Toy Museum, an Irish homestead log cabin, and an arboretum. The Freeport Art Museum is located on N. Harlem Avenue.

== Parks and recreation ==
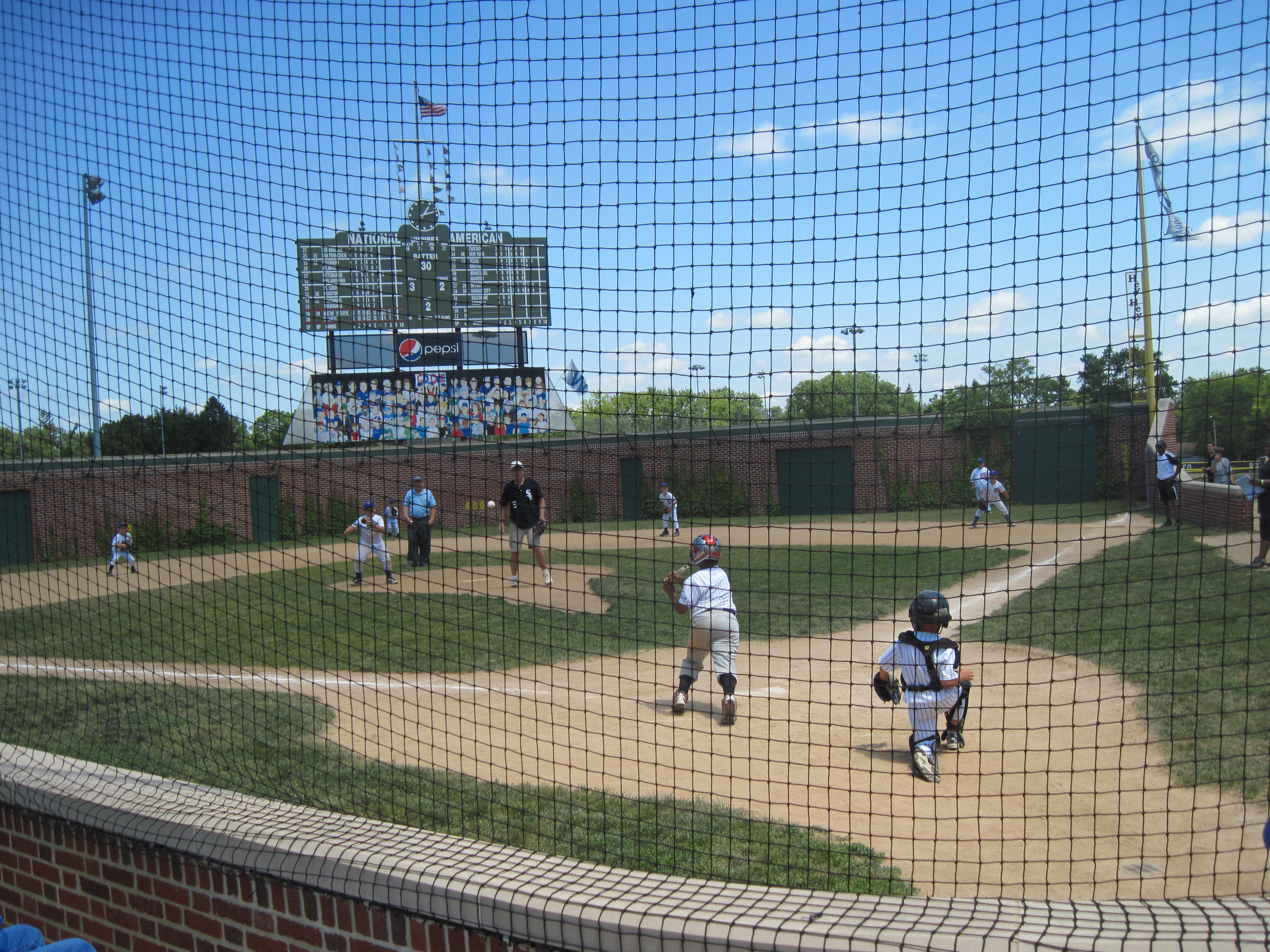
Little Cubs Field

- Krape Park was awarded "Outstanding Multi-use Facility" award by the Illinois Parks and Recreation Association. Heavily wooded Krape Park features a waterfall that tumbles down from a high limestone bluff. Visitors can ride paddle boats, play mini golf, disc golf, or play on one of the three playground areas. Krape Park is a palindrome.
- Read Park features the Read Park Family Aquatic Center and a skate park. One of the larger parks in Freeport, it also features a large pavilion, basketball courts, children's playground, shuffleboard courts, tennis courts, and softball fields. It is also home to Little Cubs Field, a replica of Wrigley Field in Chicago, IL.
- Oakdale Nature Preserve has over 133 acres (0.54 km^{2}) of forests, streams and restored prairies including more than four miles (6 km) of trails as well as a 1/3-mile hard-packed accessible trail. A historic tabernacle sits on the property, doubling as an auditorium. It is currently being restored.
- Taylor Park, a 74-acre (0.30 km^{2}) park acquired in 1911, features three lighted softball fields, concession stand, basketball courts, picnic shelter and Abraham Lincoln statue. This statue, located in the southwest section of the park, was sculpted in 1928–29 by Leonard Crunelle. Its dedication on August 27, 1929, was attended by many notable guests, and was covered by newspapers across the country.
- Bidwell Park a 2-acre (8,100 m^{2}) park presented by the heirs of Orlando B. Bidwell, features a small shelter with restrooms, a softball field, and a playground.
- Knowlton Park, a 1-acre (4,000 m^{2}) park presented by the descendants of Dexter A. Knowlton to mark the 100th anniversary of his arrival to Freeport, features a bronze tablet and tall black maple trees to shade benches and play equipment.
- Wilbur Park, a 1-acre (4,000 m^{2}) park donated by local industrialist W. T. Rawleigh and named after his son (who died during World War I), was deeded over to Freeport Park District on July 13, 1948. The park features landscaped terrain and playground equipment.

== Education ==
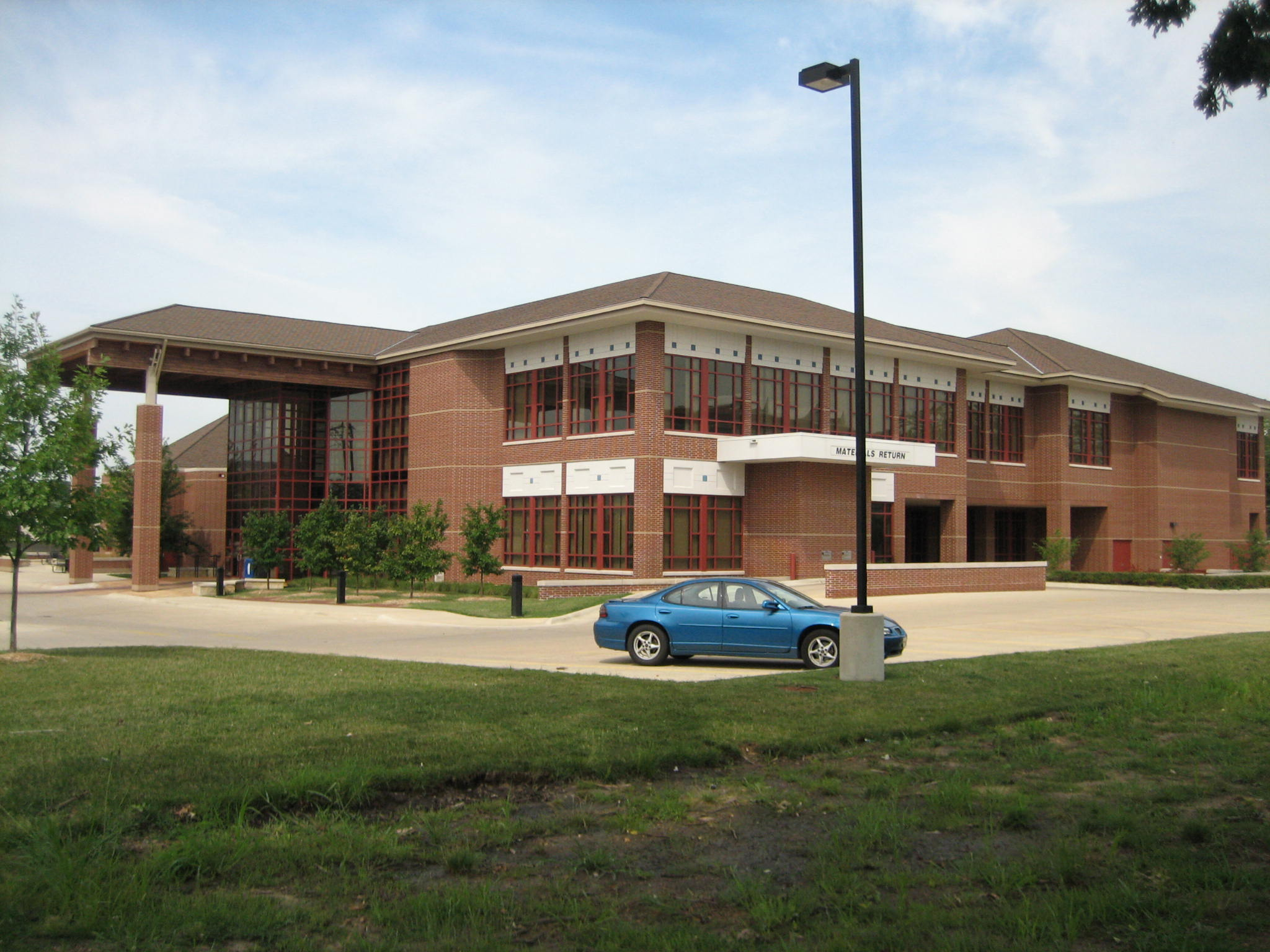
Freeport Public Library

=== Public schools ===
It is in the Freeport School District 145.

- Freeport High School
- Carl Sandburg Middle School
- Freeport Middle School
- Jones-Farrar Magnet School
- Blackhawk Elementary School
- Center Elementary School
- Empire Elementary School
- Lincoln-Douglas Elementary School
- Taylor Park Elementary School

=== Private schools ===
- Immanuel Lutheran
- Aquin Catholic Schools
- Tri-County Christian Schools
- Open Bible Learning Center

=== Colleges ===
- Highland Community College offers 68 degree and certificate programs.
- Columbia College-Freeport, located on the Highland Community College campus.

== Media ==
Local Freeport media includes WFRL Radio (1570 AM/104.3 FM), WFPS Radio (92.1 FM) and The Journal Standard daily newspaper.

== Transportation ==
U.S. Route 20 runs along the north side of Freeport. Freeport and surrounding Stephenson County are serviced by Pretzel City Area Transit (PCAT), a private company in partnership with the Senior Resource Center that provides small bus and van transportation throughout the region. PCAT provides over 83,000 rides per year.

Albertus Airport is a civil public-use airport located 3-mile (4.8 km) southeast of Freeport. The airport is owned by the city.

Freeport has a rail line running east and west on the north side of city. Freeport station opened in 1849 along the Chicago and North Western Railway, and was also shared by the Illinois Central Railroad starting in 1853. The Milwaukee Road used a separate station across the Pecatonica River. Passenger service ceased upon the formation of Amtrak in 1971, but resumed in 1974 under the name Black Hawk. Service ceased again on September 30, 1981.

== Notable people ==
- Joseph M. Bailey, jurist and legislator
- Dan Balz, award-winning political reporter for the Washington Post
- Ken Behring, owned the NFL's Seattle Seahawks
- Harry Boeke, Illinois state senator and businessman
- Carl Cain, 1956 Olympic basketball gold medalist, University of Iowa basketball player
- John Callahan, Major League Baseball player
- Janet H. Clark, Minnesota state legislator
- Alfred A. Cohn, journalist and newspaper editor, Police Commissioner
- A.D. Condo, cartoonist
- Tim Cunningham, actor
- Richard Wayne Dirksen, organist and choirmaster
- William Eckert, Air Force general, Major League Baseball commissioner
- Calista Flockhart, actress
- James B. Goetz, Minnesota Lieutenant Governor
- Tuffy Gosewisch, Major League Baseball player
- Charles Guiteau, assassin of US President James A. Garfield
- Corky Hale, jazz musician
- Clare Winger Harris, science fiction author
- Oscar E. Heard, Illinois jurist
- Edmund Heller (1875–1939) zoologist
- Homer Hillebrand, Major League Baseball player
- Donna Jogerst, All-American Girls Professional Baseball League player
- Robert L. Johnson, founder of Black Entertainment Television (BET)
- Francis Lamb, Wisconsin State Assemblyman
- Edward E. Laughlin, Illinois State Senator and lawyer
- Gerald McClellan, middleweight boxing champion
- John Meyer, Illinois State Representative
- Warren John Nutter (1937–2021) murderer
- Louella Parsons, gossip columnist and screenwriter
- Ravi Patel, film and TV actor
- Trisha Paytas, YouTube personality
- Jason Pearson, Major League Baseball player
- Preston Pearson, National Football League player
- William Buckley Peck, founder of the Inter-State Postgraduate Medical Association of North America
- Julia Phillips, physicist and science policy leader
- William Thomas Rawleigh, industrialist, Illinois State Representative
- Harlan Rigney, Illinois State Representative
- Stephen A. Rigney, Illinois state representative
- William Avery Rockefeller, father of John D. Rockefeller
- Adolph Rupp, basketball coach Freeport HS and Univ. of Kentucky
- Manuel Seal - Grammy Award-winning producer
- Ted Snyder, songwriter
- Charles J. Stine, silent film actor
- Tiffany Thayer, author, actor, Thirteen Women
- Alice Bradford Wiles, Chicago clubwoman, lived in Freeport
- Steve Luecke, mayor of South Bend, Indiana, 1997-2012

== See also ==
- Knights of the Globe
