= Harlan Rigney =

American farmer and politician

Harlan H. Rigney (June 27, 1933 – November 23, 1994) was an American farmer and politician.

Born in Freeport, Illinois, Rigney served in the United States Army from 1954 to 1956. He received his bachelor's degree in agricultural economics from the University of Illinois. Rigney was a farmer and was involved with the Republican Party. He served in the Illinois Constitutional Convention of 1970 and was a township supervisor. From 1973 to 1983, Rigney served in the Illinois House of Representatives and then served in the Illinois Senate from 1983 to 1993. Rigney died from a heart attack at a hospital in Freeport, Illinois.
