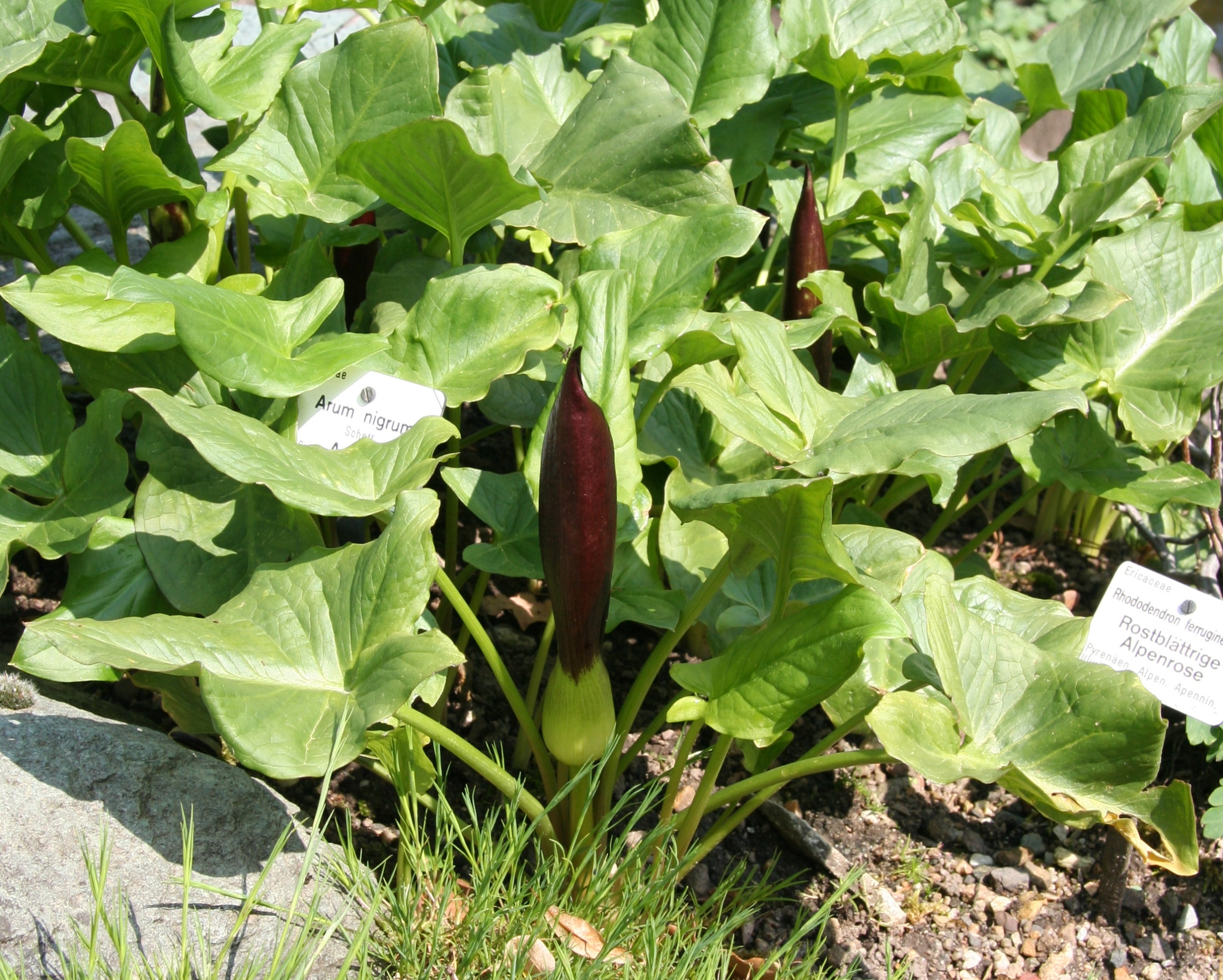

Scientific classification
- Kingdom: Plantae
- Clade: Tracheophytes
- Clade: Angiosperms
- Clade: Monocots
- Order: Alismatales
- Family: Araceae
- Genus: Arum
- Species: A. nigrum

Binomial name
- Arum nigrum Schott (1857)

Synonyms
- List: Arum neumayeri Vis. ex Beck (1904); Arum nigrum var. schottii Engl. (1920), not validly publ.; Arum nigrum var. variolatum (Schott) Nyman (1882); Arum orientale var. nigrum (Schott) Engl. (1879); Arum orientale subsp. nigrum (Schott) K.Richt. (1890); Arum orientale f. variolatum (Schott) Engl. (1879); Arum variolatum Schott (1860)

= Arum nigrum =

Species of flowering plant

Arum nigrum, commonly known as black arum, is a perennial herbaceous plant that can grow up to 1 m (3 ft 3 in) tall. It has a large underground tuber that stores nutrients and allows the plant to survive during periods of drought. The leaves of Arum nigrum are large, arrow-shaped, and glossy green in color, reaching a length of up to 30 cm (12 in). The flowers of this plant are the most distinctive feature, as they are black in color, with a central spadix surrounded by a large petal-like bract called a spathe.

== Habitat and cultivation ==
Arum nigrum is native to the Balkan Peninsula and North Greece. It can be found in garrigue, rocky hillsides, and soil pockets.

== Taxonomy and phylogeny ==
Arum nigrum, belongs to the family Araceae and is one of several species within the genus Arum. The genus Arum has been the subject of various taxonomic and phylogenetic studies, with some researchers proposing new classifications and keys to the infrageneric taxa. The distribution of Arum nigrum has also been studied, with some researchers examining its affinities to other Arum species, such as those found in southern Greece.

== Medicinal potential ==
While there is limited information specifically about the medicinal potential of Arum nigrum, plants belonging to the genus Arum have been used for nutritional and medicinal purposes for many centuries, despite their toxicity.
