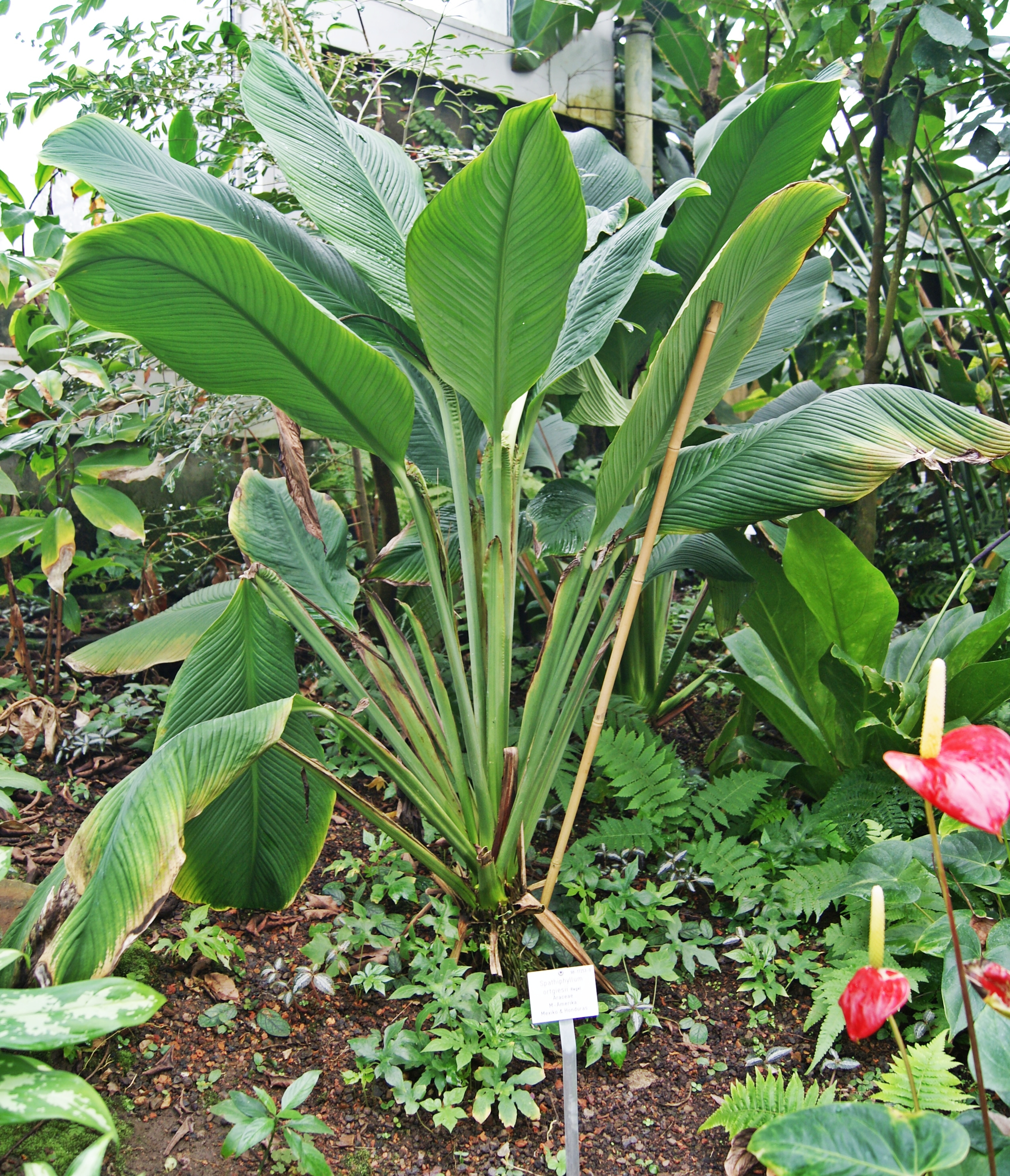

Scientific classification
- Kingdom: Plantae
- Clade: Tracheophytes
- Clade: Angiosperms
- Clade: Monocots
- Order: Alismatales
- Family: Araceae
- Genus: Spathiphyllum
- Species: S. ortgiesii

Binomial name
- Spathiphyllum ortgiesii Regel

= Spathiphyllum ortgiesii =

Species of flowering plant

Spathiphyllum ortgiesii is a flowering plant in the family Araceae, native to southern Mexico. This species is sometimes traded as 'peace lily'

It is a herbaceous perennial plant. The large leaves are oval to lanceolate. The flowers are produced in a spadix, surrounded by a (usually white) spathe.
