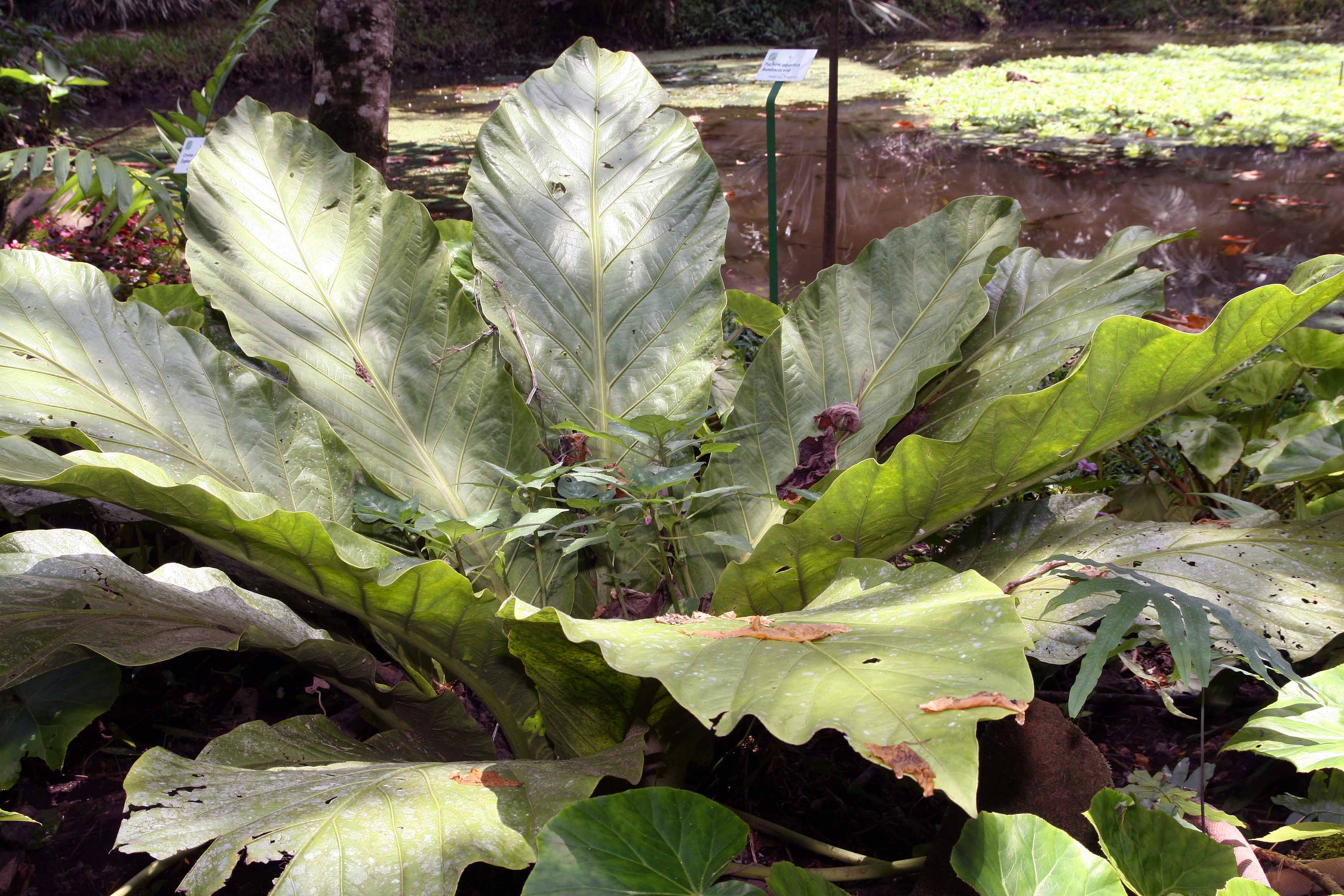

Scientific classification
- Kingdom: Plantae
- Clade: Tracheophytes
- Clade: Angiosperms
- Clade: Monocots
- Order: Alismatales
- Family: Araceae
- Genus: Anthurium
- Species: A. salvinii

Binomial name
- Anthurium salvinii Hemsl. (1879)

Synonyms
- Anthurium enormispadix Anthurium giganteum

= Anthurium salvinii =

Species of plant

Anthurium salvinii, commonly known as bird's nest anthurium or tabacon, is a species of herbaceous epiphyte (sometimes lithophyte), in the genus Anthurium. Native from southern Mexico, Costa Rica, Honduras, Guatemala, Nicaragua, Panama through to Colombia.

It consists of a rosette of leaves, each up to 1.8 m (5.9 ft) long and about one-third as wide. The rosette acts as a catch basin for falling leaves and other detritus which provides nutrients for the plant. The spathe is up to 45 cm (18 in) in height while the spadix becomes as much as 60 cm (24 in) when in fruit. The fruit is a 0.64 cm (0.25 in) red berry. This plant is unusual for a flowering plant in having circinate vernation (leaves unfolding in the manner of a fern).
