= Spat =

Spat may refer to:

- Spat (angular unit), a unit of solid angle
- Spat (distance unit), an obsolete distance unit in astronomy
- Spats (footwear), a type of shoe accessory
- Wheel spats, British term for aerodynamic fairings that reduce the drag on fixed-undercarriage aircraft
- Spat, the past tense of spit
- Spat (molluscs), settled larvae of shellfish such as oysters and scallops
- Spat, the main villain in the game Hamtaro Ham-Ham Heartbreak
- SPAT, Toamasina Autonomous Port of Madagascar, from French Société de Gestion du Port Autonome de Toamasina
- S.P.A.T., Polish Special Forces, from Polish Samodzielny Pododdział Antyterrorystyczny Komisariatu Policji
- Signal Phase and Timing (SPaT) for communication between connected cars and traffic signals

== See also ==
- Spath (disambiguation)
- Spats (disambiguation)
- Spatter (disambiguation)
