= Spats =

Spats or SPATS may refer to:

- Spats (footwear), a type of shoe accessory
- Spats (radio series), a comedy sketch show on BBC 7
- Spats Baxter, a character in Movie Movie (1978), played by George C. Scott
- "Spats" Columbo, lead gangster in the film Some Like It Hot (1959)
- The Spats, a 1970s band in New Zealand
- The Spats (American band), a 1960s band in California, U.S.
- Fender skirts, automobile wheel covers, known as spats in Australia and the UK
- An aircraft fairing covering the wheels
- Compression shorts, known as spats in Japan
- South Pacific Association of Theological Schools
- SPATS (Sea ship, Plane, Automobile, Train, Space craft), an acronym developed by comedian Jesse Case and popularized by the podcast Probably Science, bestowed upon actors who have appeared in all five types of vehicles in their films.

== See also ==
- Carl Andrew Spaatz, US Air Force general
- Spaatz Island, a large ice-covered island of Antarctica
- Spat (disambiguation)
- Spatz
