= Snowflower =

Snowflower or snow flower may refer to:

- Sarcodes sanguinea, a North American parasitic plant
- Spathiphyllum floribundum, a South American flowering plant
- Deutzia gracilis, a Japanese bushy, deciduous shrub
- Snow Flower (TV series), a 2006–07 South Korean television show
- Snow Flower (film), a 2019 Japanese romance film
- Snow Flower and the Secret Fan, a 2005 novel by Lisa See
- "Yuki no Hana", or "Snow Flower", a 2003 song by Mika Nakashima
- "Snow Flower", a song by Taemin from the 2017 album Move
- "Snow Flower", a 2020 song by V and Peakboy
