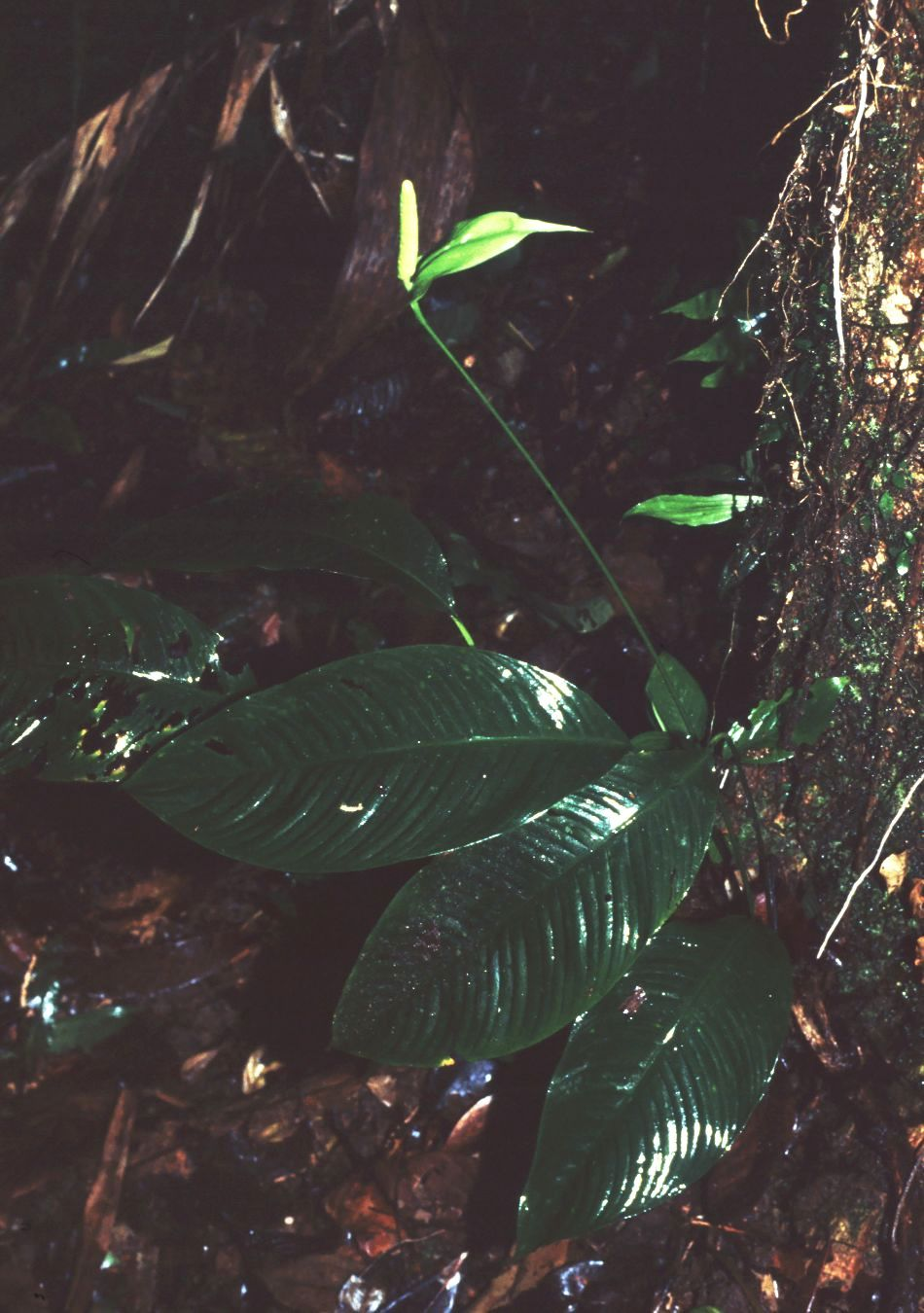

Scientific classification
- Kingdom: Plantae
- Clade: Tracheophytes
- Clade: Angiosperms
- Clade: Monocots
- Order: Alismatales
- Family: Araceae
- Genus: Spathiphyllum
- Species: S. silvicola

Binomial name
- Spathiphyllum silvicola R.A.Baker

= Spathiphyllum silvicola =

Species of flowering plant

Spathiphyllum silvicola is a flowering plant of the genus Spathiphyllum in the family Araceae. It is native to Colombia and Costa Rica.
