= Spatterdash =

Spatterdash may refer to:

- Gaiters
- Spats (footwear)
- Spatter (disambiguation)
