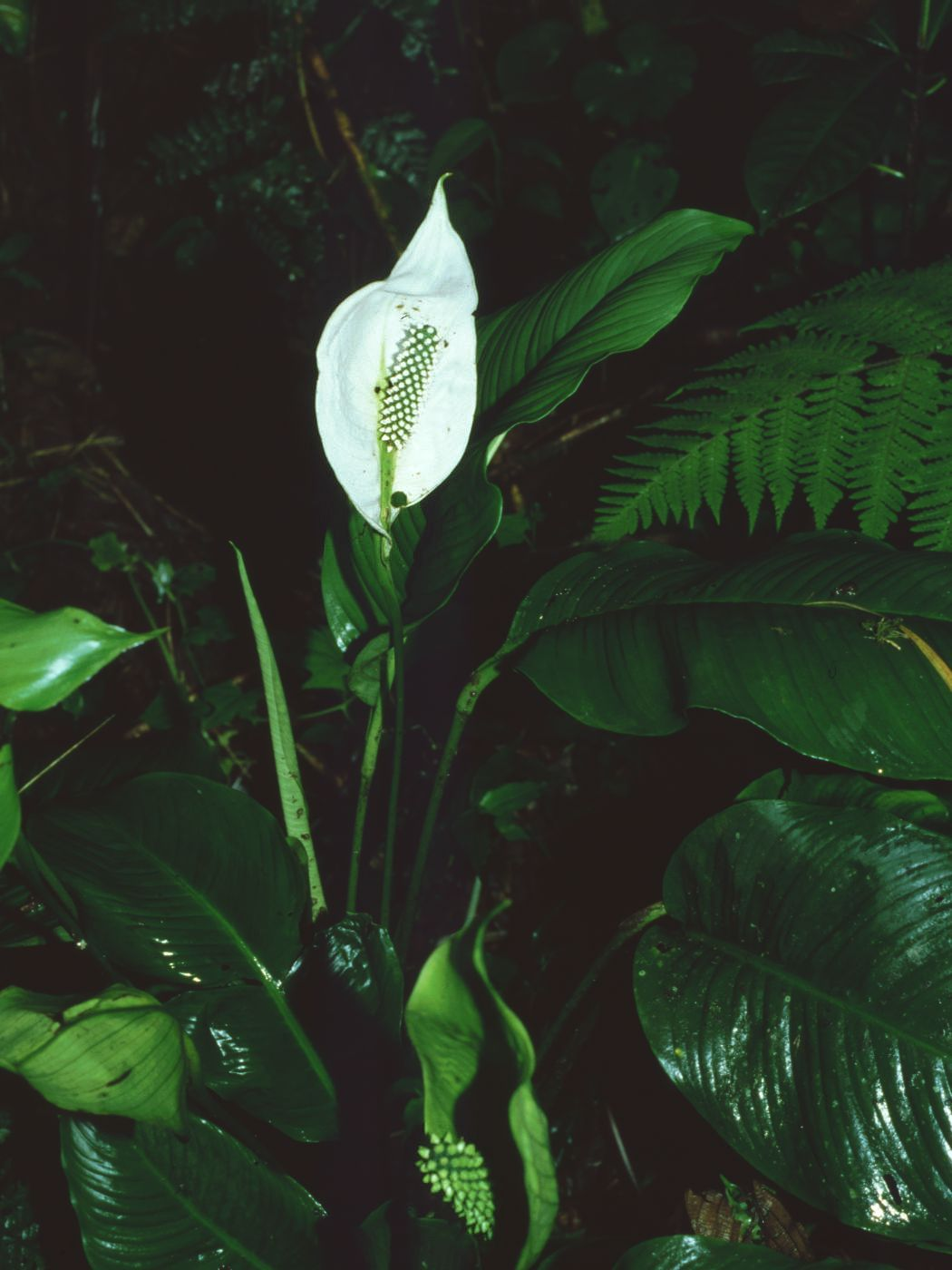

Scientific classification
- Kingdom: Plantae
- Clade: Tracheophytes
- Clade: Angiosperms
- Clade: Monocots
- Order: Alismatales
- Family: Araceae
- Genus: Spathiphyllum
- Species: S. montanum

Binomial name
- Spathiphyllum montanum (R.A.Baker) Grayum

Synonyms
- Spathiphyllum wendlandii subsp. montanum R.A.Baker

= Spathiphyllum montanum =

Species of flowering plant

Spathiphyllum montanum is a flowering plant of the genus Spathiphyllum in the family Araceae. It is native to Panama and Costa Rica.
