= Spath (disambiguation) =

Spath may refer to:

- Spath, a British village
- Leonard Frank Spath (1882–1957), a British paleomalacologist
- an abbreviation for the plant Spathiphyllum

== See also ==
- Späth, a surname, with a list of people of this name
