= Gregg De Lorto =

American singer-songwriter

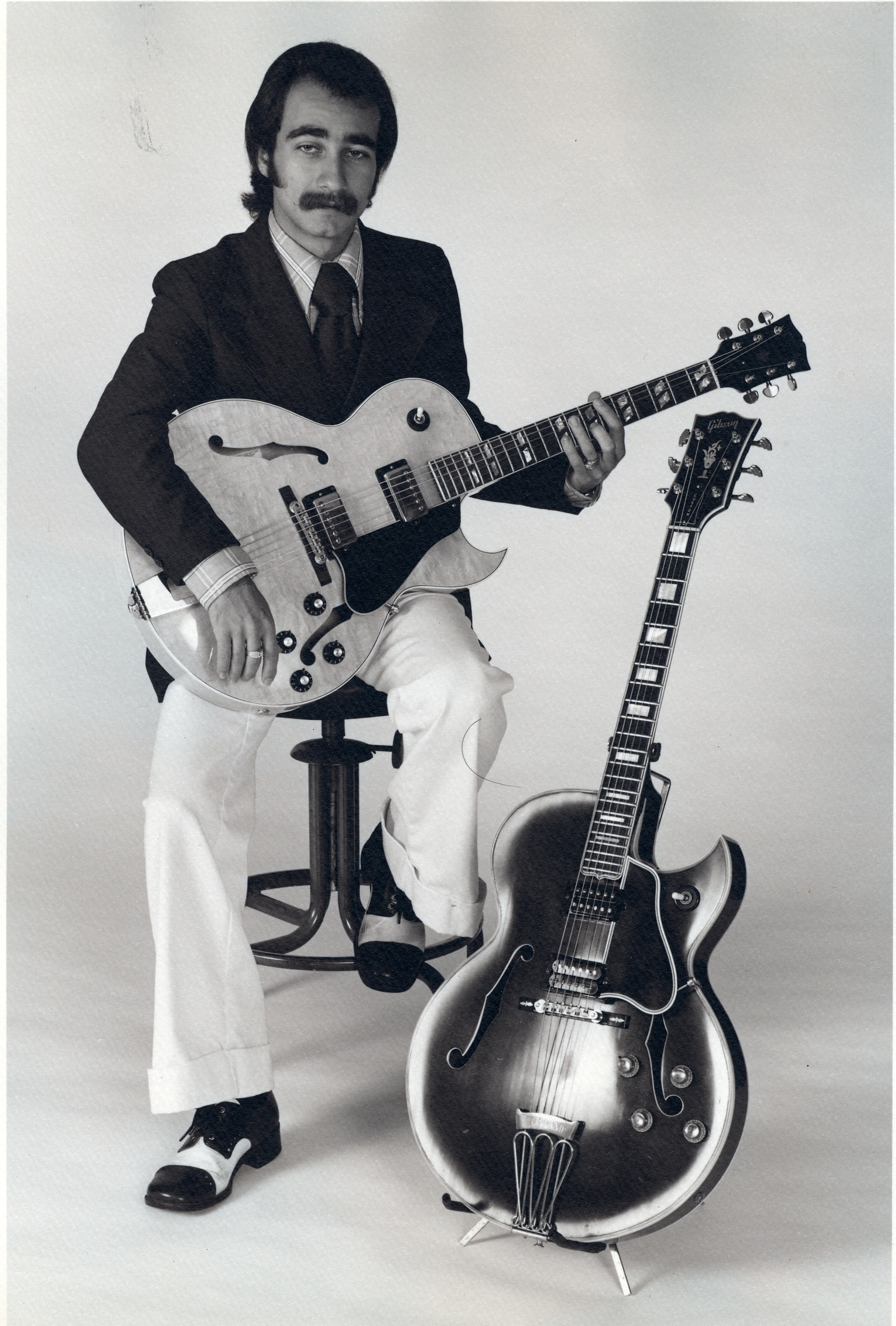
Gregg De Lorto, ca 1973

Gregg De Lorto (born October 12, 1950) is an American guitarist, singer-songwriter, arranger, record producer and the California representative for The Heritage Guitar Company of Kalamazoo – Heritage Guitars. He is a native of California and the great-grandson of two Italian-born musicians and old world luthiers (violin makers). Without knowledge of his musical roots, De Lorto began playing the guitar at the age of nine, performing at schools and local venues, all the while increasing his musical range. By 14, he had become a professional musician when he joined Limey and The Yanks.

The following year, he auditioned for the popular ABC Paramount recording group The Spats.

Since George Harrison was one of his heroes, by the time De Lorto joined The Spats he had already mastered The Beatles’ songs. With the Johnson brothers’ vocal range equal to that of the Fab Four, and De Lorto not only knowing The Beatles music note-for-note, but he played the same Gretsch guitar as his hero and The Spats easily added the sounds of the British Invasion as well as The Rascals, Vanilla Fudge, Santana, The Doors and other styles to their roster. After that, his focus unexpectedly turned to jazz when he first heard Wes Montgomery’s "Bump’n On Sunset."

Over the years, De Lorto focused on honing the styles of the guitar greats: B.B. King, Eric Clapton, Kenny Burrell, Wes Montgomery, Charlie Christian and others. By 1980, he became a representative for Gibson Guitar Corporation, and then in 1985 for The Heritage Guitar Company of Kalamazoo. As his ancestors before him, he had to learn and know each and every aspect of the instruments he played, which led him to becoming well versed on the construction and history of the guitar. Today, he shares that knowledge by holding clinics on The History of the Carve Top Jazz Guitar and The Heritage Guitar Company of Kalamazoo throughout California.

After losing his voice in 1995, De Lorto had surgery to remove nodules on his vocal cords. In 2007, he was diagnosed with an inoperable midbrain tumor. Feeling his time was not over and not ready to give up, he sought the best and was referred to neurosurgeon Mark E. Linskey, M.D., at UC Irvine Medical Center.

During their first meeting De Lorto told Dr. Linskey he was concerned about how the operation would affect his right and left hand coordination. Dr. Linskey said "this is not a textbook surgery…," but not to worry and that he wanted to see him playing his guitar at his one year post-op appointment. Three weeks after their first meeting Dr. Linskey successfully excised the tumor followed by a two-week medically induced coma.

Soon after waking from the coma, and not able to eat or walk on his own, from his recovery bed, he was composing in his head his "Ode to Charlie Christian" – a complex arrangement. At his one year post-op appointment he walked in with his Heritage Golden Eagle and amazed Dr. Linskey and his staff by playing a compilation of Charlie Christian licks and lines consisting of single string and chord melody, his "Ode to Charlie Christian."

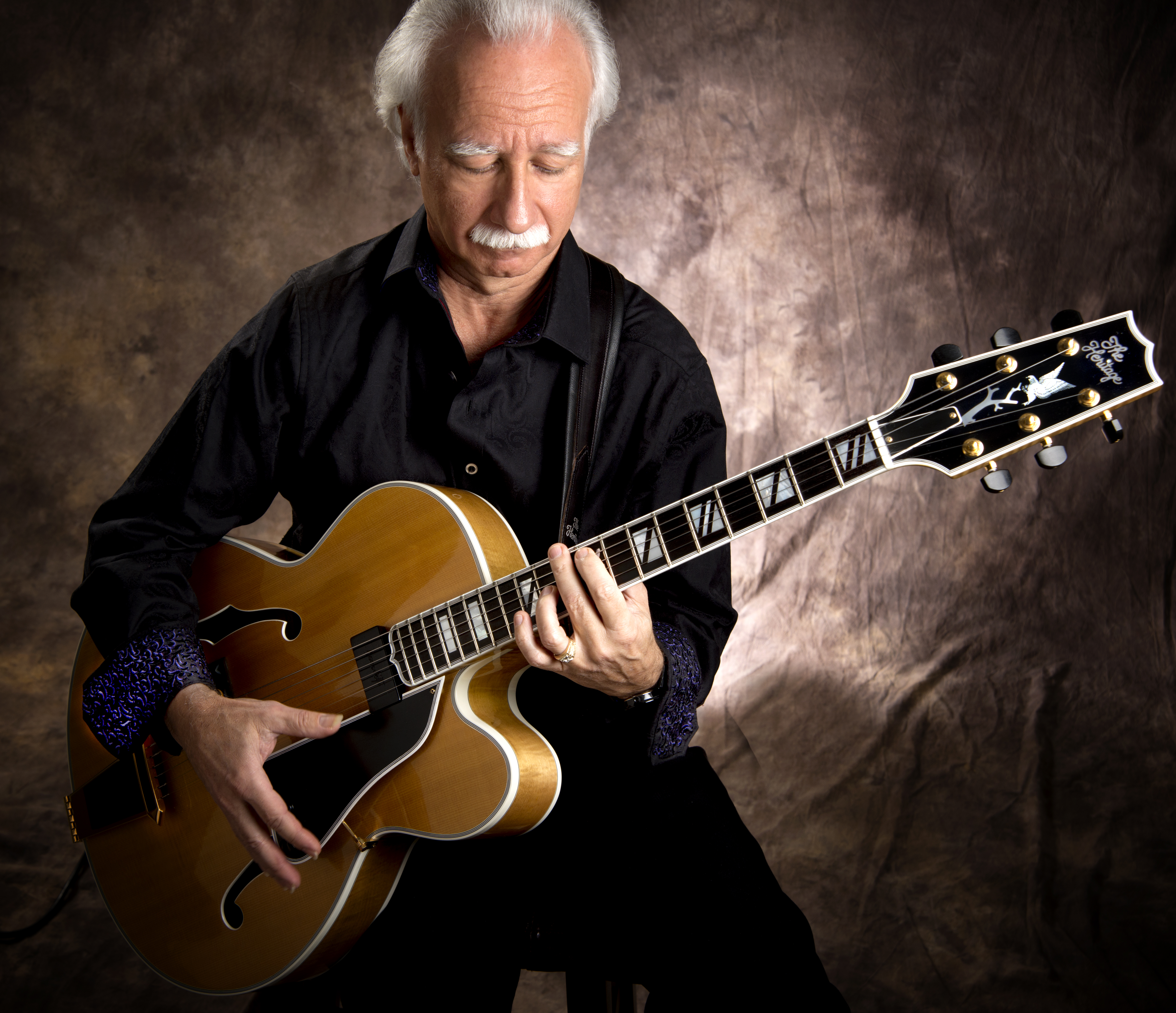
Gregg De Lorto recording "Serenade Me In the Moonlight" with his Heritage Golden Eagle

== Song titles ==
Serenade Me in the Moonlight released August 1, 2013 under the label De Lorto Music."
