= Splatter =

Splatter may refer to:

- Blood splatter
- Spectral splatter, radio electronics and acoustics
- Splatter cone, a type of volcano
- Splatter guard
- Splatter painting

== Entertainment ==
- Splatter film, horror film genre with excessive bloody gore
  - Splatter Farm (1986)
  - Splatter Beach (2006)
- Splatter Theatre, comedy play
- Splatters, a Buckethead album

== See also ==
- Splat (disambiguation)
- Spatter (disambiguation)
- Spray (disambiguation)
