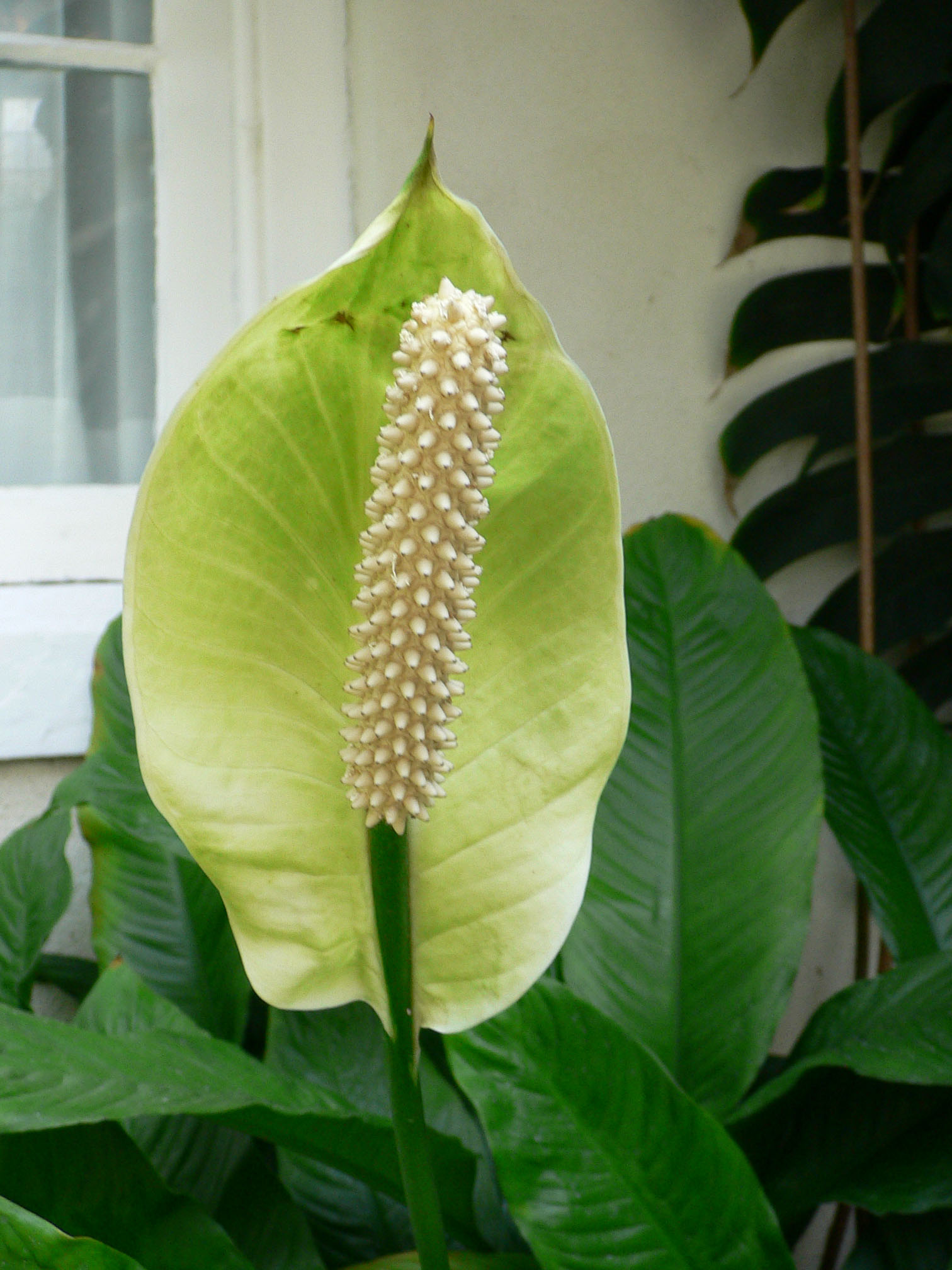

Scientific classification
- Kingdom: Plantae
- Clade: Tracheophytes
- Clade: Angiosperms
- Clade: Monocots
- Order: Alismatales
- Family: Araceae
- Genus: Spathiphyllum
- Species: S. floribundum

Binomial name
- Spathiphyllum floribundum (Linden & André) N.E.Br.

Synonyms
- Amomophyllum floribundum (Linden & André) Engl.; Anthurium floribundum Linden & André

= Spathiphyllum floribundum =

Species of plant

Spathiphyllum floribundum, the snowflower, peace lily, is a flowering plant in the family Araceae, native to northwestern South America from Panama east to Venezuela and south to Peru.

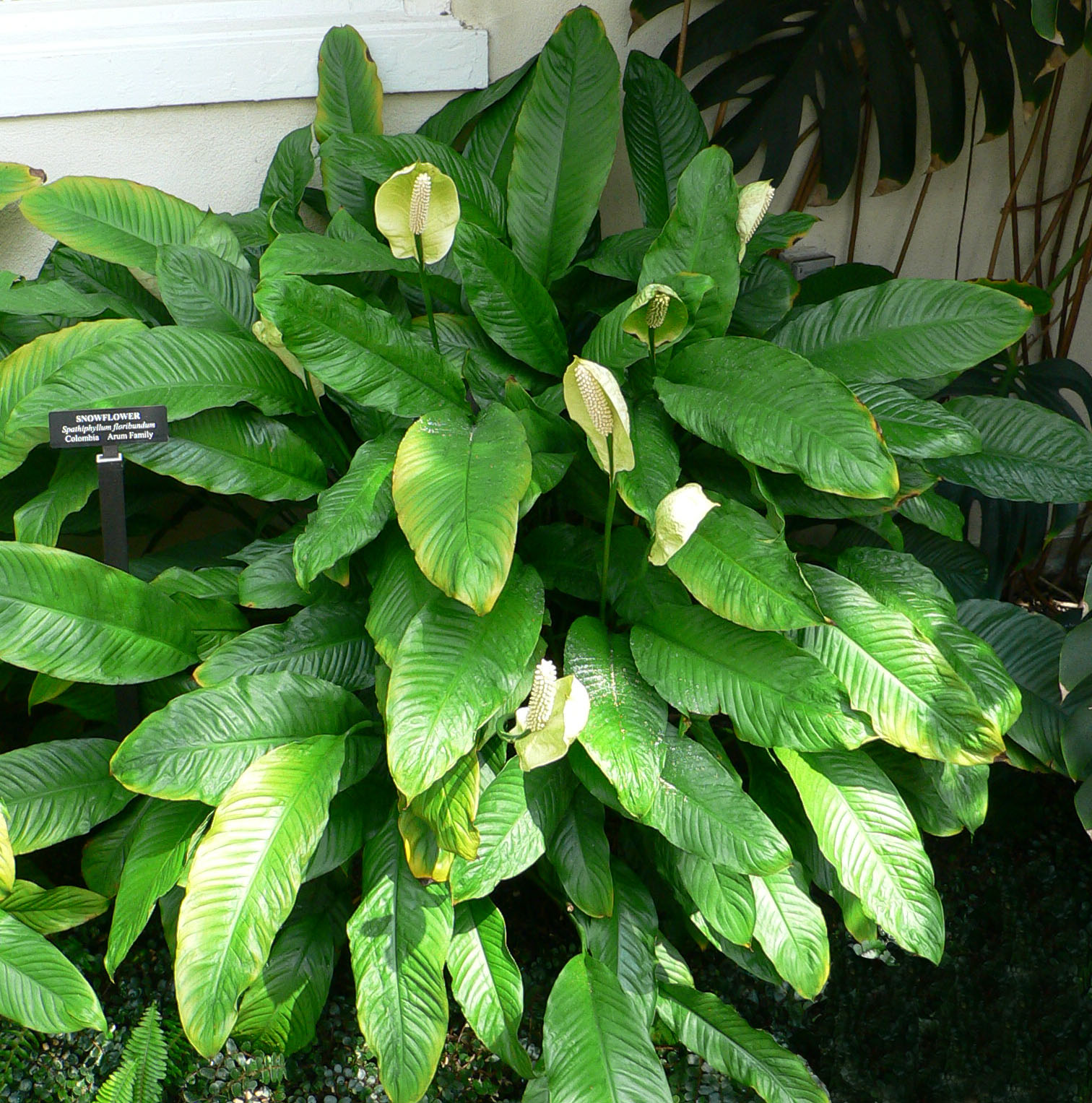
Plant at Longwood Gardens

It is a herbaceous perennial plant. The leaves are oval to lanceolate, 12–20 cm long and 5–9 cm broad. The flowers are produced in a spadix, surrounded by a 10–20 cm long, greenish- or yellowish-white spathe.
