= Spatter =

Spatter may refer to:

- Spattering, a process in which synthetic fabrics are coated with a fine layer of metal
- Food spatter: the splashing and scattering of oil droplets during frying. Anti-spattering substances are used by food technology to reduce this phenomenon. Also spatter can be produced in microwave oven by the liquids of the food.
- The small, unwanted droplets of molten metal emitted during welding.
- Blood spatter
- Spatter cone, volcano cone
- Spatterdock, water plant

== See also ==
- Spat (disambiguation)
- Spatterdash (disambiguation)
- Splatter (disambiguation)
