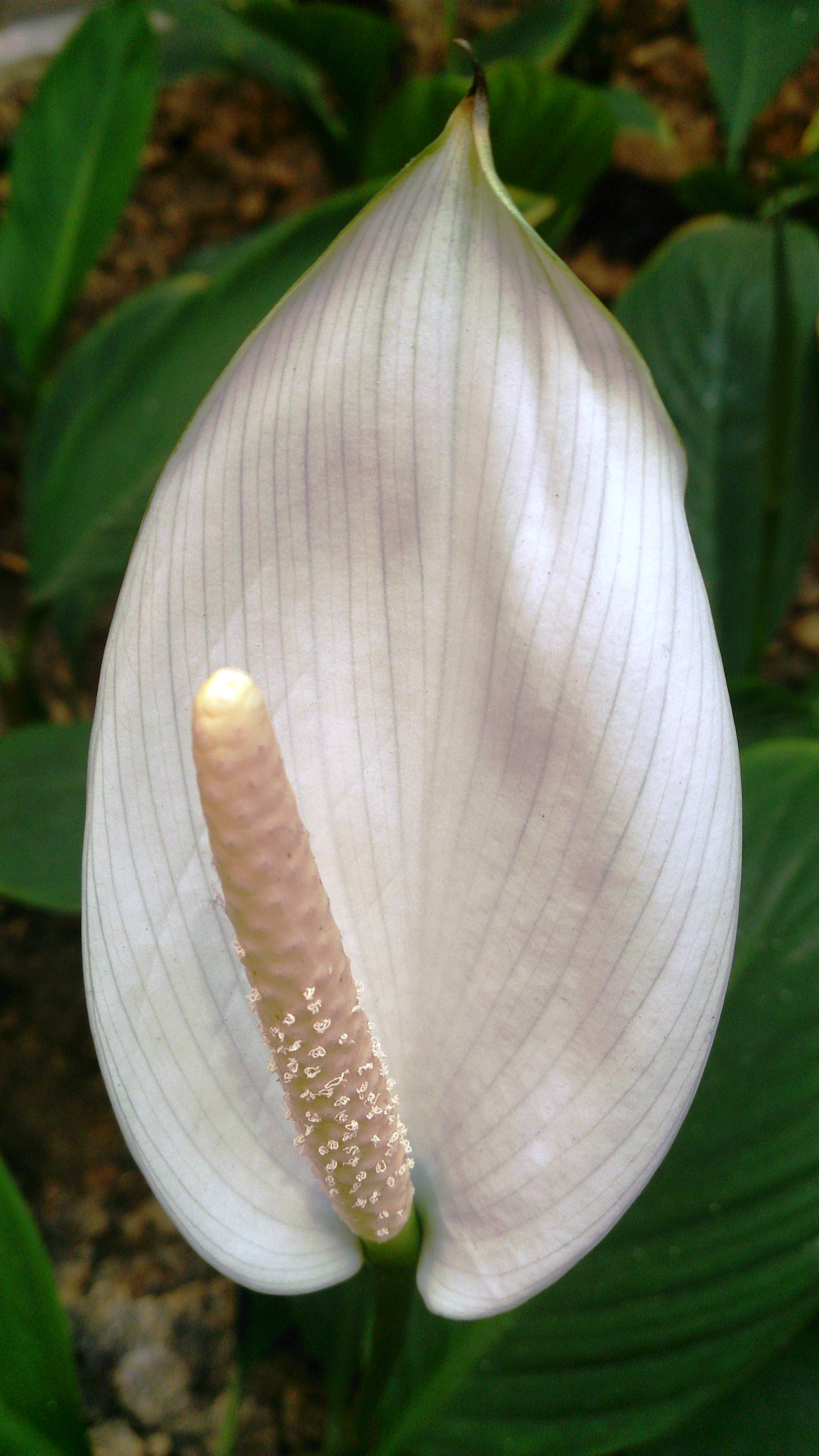
- Close up of flower
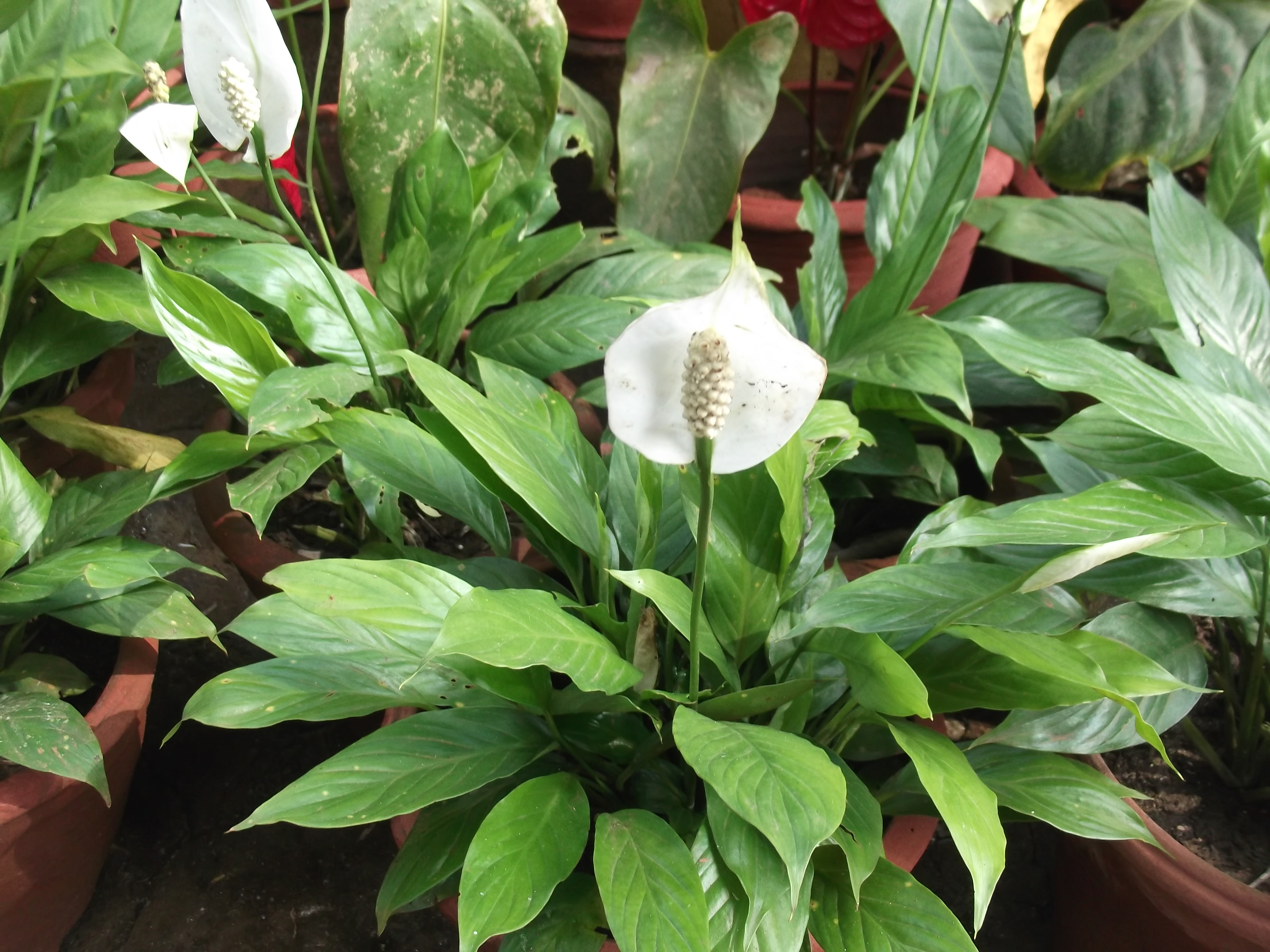
- Potted specimens

Scientific classification
- Kingdom: Plantae
- Clade: Tracheophytes
- Clade: Angiosperms
- Clade: Monocots
- Order: Alismatales
- Family: Araceae
- Genus: Spathiphyllum
- Species: S. cannifolium

Binomial name
- Spathiphyllum cannifolium (Dryand. ex Sims) Schott

Synonyms
- List: Anthurium dechardii Andrews; Dracunculus cannifolius (Dryand. ex Sims) Raf.; Leucochlamys callacea Poepp. ex Engl.; Massowia cannifolia (Dryand. ex Sims) K.Koch; Massowia canniformis (Kunth) K.Koch; Philodendron cannifolium (Dryand. ex Sims) Sweet; Pothos cannifolius Dryand. ex Sims; Pothos canniformis Kunth; Pothos leucophaeus Poepp. ex Engl.; Pothos odoratus Anderson ex Sims; Spathiphyllum bonplandii Schott; Spathiphyllum candicans Poepp.; Spathiphyllum cannifolium var. nanum Engl.; Spathiphyllum canniforme (Kunth) Engl.; Spathiphyllum dechardii (Andrews) L.Gentil

= Spathiphyllum cannifolium =

Species of plant

Spathiphyllum cannifolium, the canna-leaf peace lily or spatheflower (a name it shares with other members of its genus), is a species of flowering plant in the family Araceae. It is native to wet tropical areas of Trinidad and northern and western South America. A clumping perennial reaching 50 cm (20 in), it is widely kept as a houseplant.

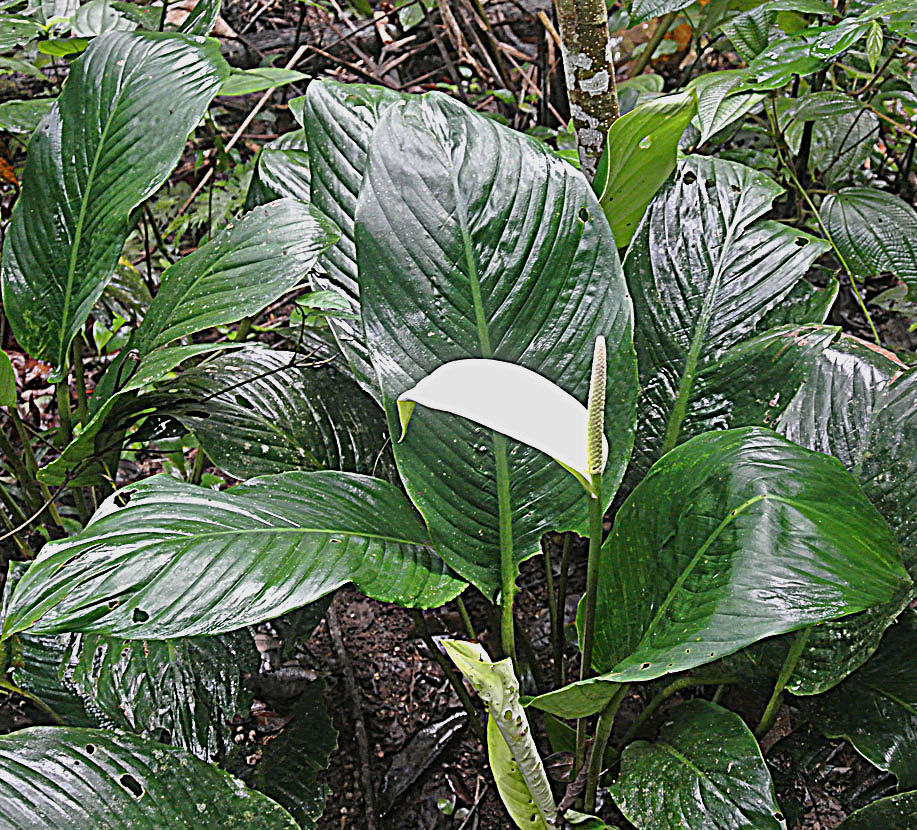
In the wild in Jatun Sacha, Ecuador

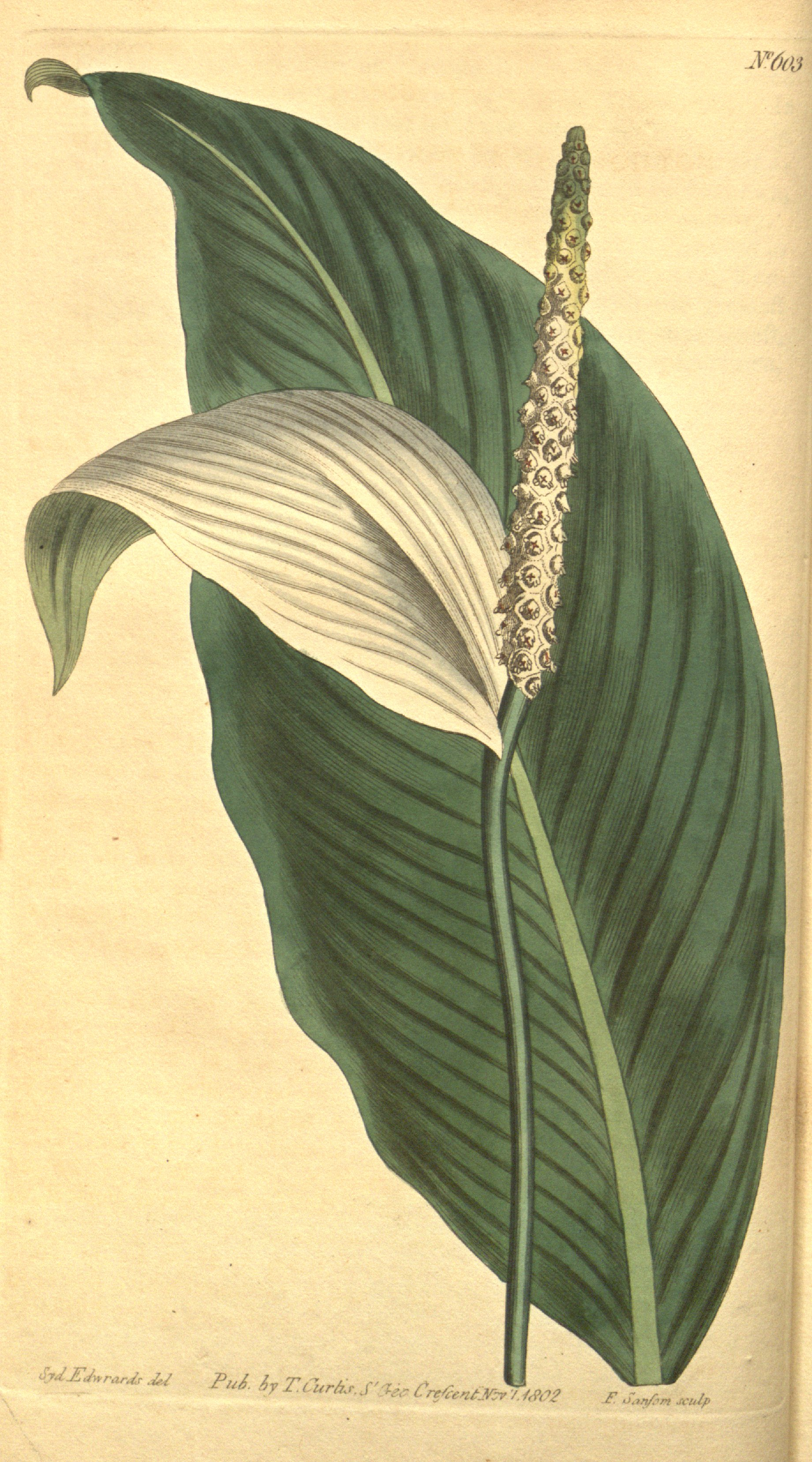
Botanical illustration

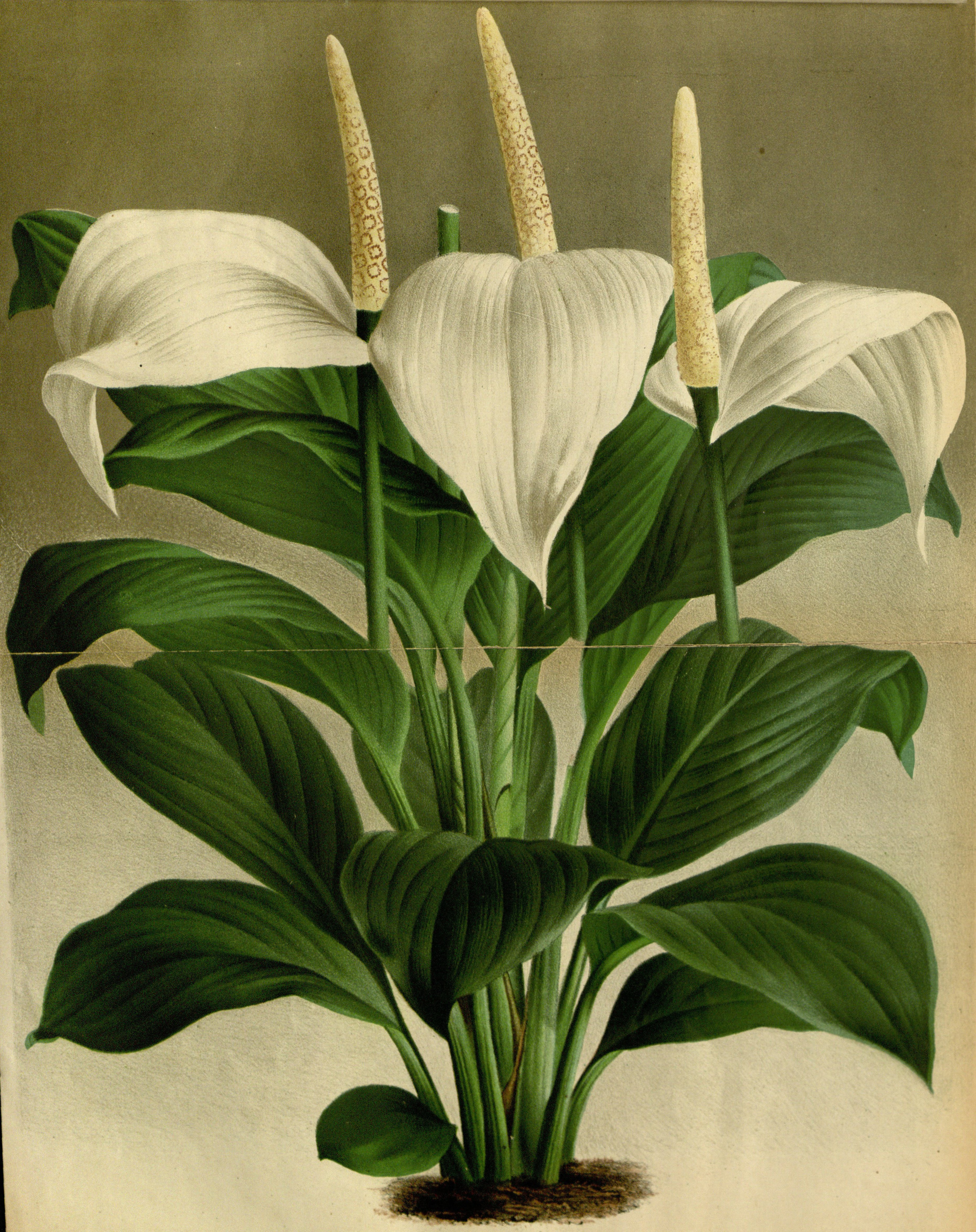
From L'illustration horticole, 1877
