= The Spats (American band) =

American rock band

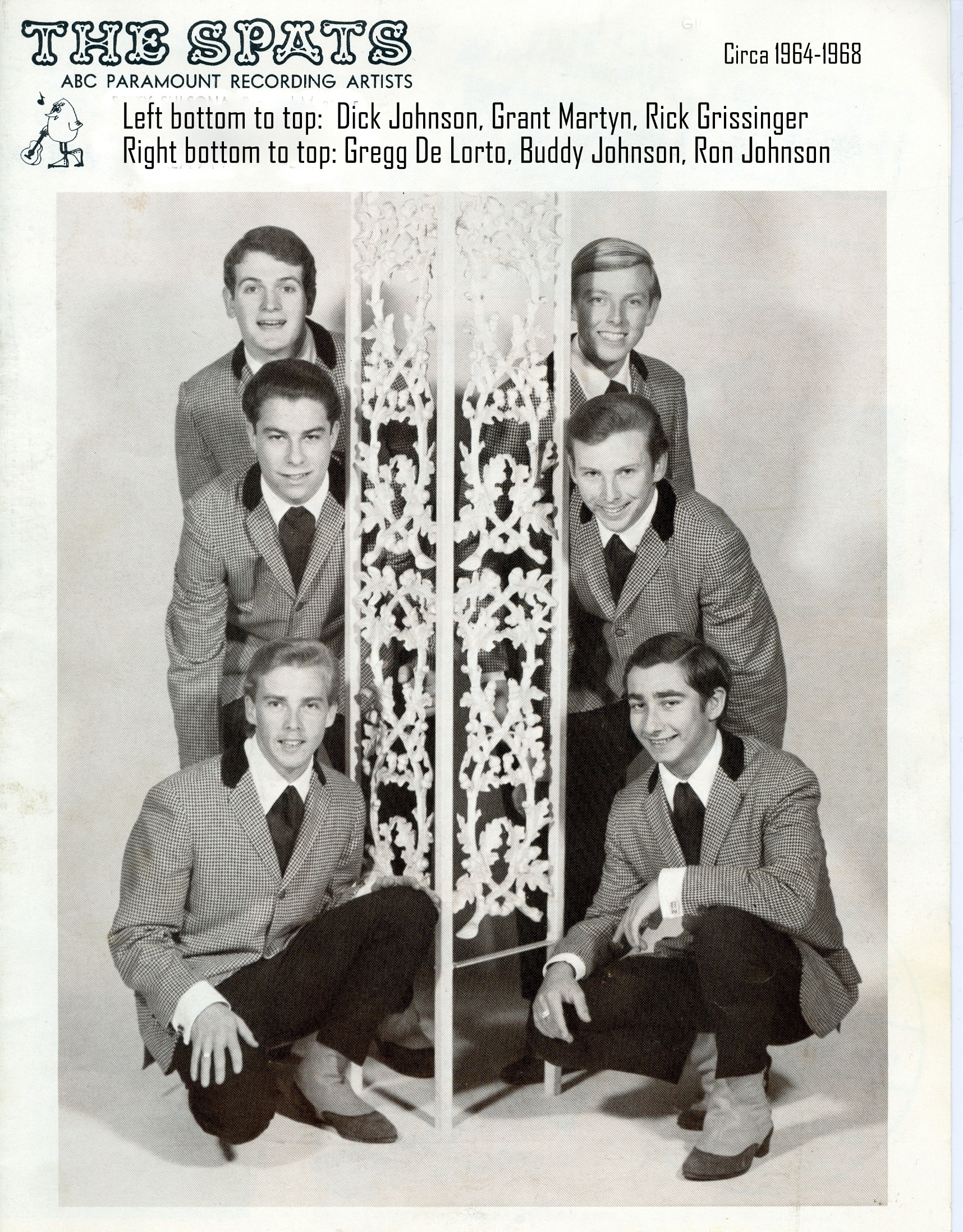
- The Spats in 1967

Background information
- Genres: Garage rock
- Years active: 1964–1968
- Label: ABC Paramount Records
- Past members: Dick Johnson; Bud Johnson; Ron Johnson; Mike Sulsona; Chuck Scott; Bob Dennis; Myron Carpino; Doug Rhodes; Gregg De Lorto; David Amaro; Stephen Anderson; Grant Martyn; Rick Grissinger

The Spats was an American rock band active in Southern California between 1964 and 1968. Its members included Dick Johnson (vocalist), Bud Johnson (rhythm guitar), Ron Johnson (bass), Mike Sulsona (drums), Chuck Scott (a.k.a. Charles Irving Showalter, 1946-2008) (piano), Bob Dennis (saxophone), Myron Carpino (1947-2009) (lead guitar), and later Doug Rhodes (tuba and keyboards on: "Scooby Doo" and "She Done Moved").

The three teenage Johnson brothers comprised the core of the band. They performed under other names, including the Nomads (1962), the Temptations (1963), and the Dick Johnson Sextet (1964) before officially becoming The Spats in June 1964. The band members were snappy dressers; while shopping one day they spotted a pair of spats which eventually became their trademark and band name.

They were signed to ABC Paramount Records and released an LP, Cookin' With The Spats (1965), and several singles including "Gator Tails and Monkey Ribs", written by Alonzo B. Willis. Later members included lead guitarist Gregg De Lorto, finally replaced by David Amaro. When Bud Johnson was drafted in 1968, Stephen Anderson joined on rhythm guitar and backing vocals. Grant Martyn a.k.a. Donald G. Martyn (1949-2005) replaced Doug Rhodes on the keyboard and provided vocals. Rick Grissinger replaced Mike Sulsona in 1966 and played with the band until the end.

Their clean-cut look and trademark spats made them a Disneyland favorite. In 1967, they were the guest band at the grand opening of Disneyland's New Tomorrowland Terrace and the first band to perform on its elevator stage. In addition to their steady weekly live appearances at many different venues throughout Southern California, The Spats also appeared on local TV and radio programs, including Dick Clark’s American Bandstand, Shindig!, Shebang with Casey Kasem, and (on November 6, 1967) the Andy Williams special, Love, Andy. They were also in an episode of My Mother the Car.

The band dissolved in late 1968 due to so many of its members being drafted.
