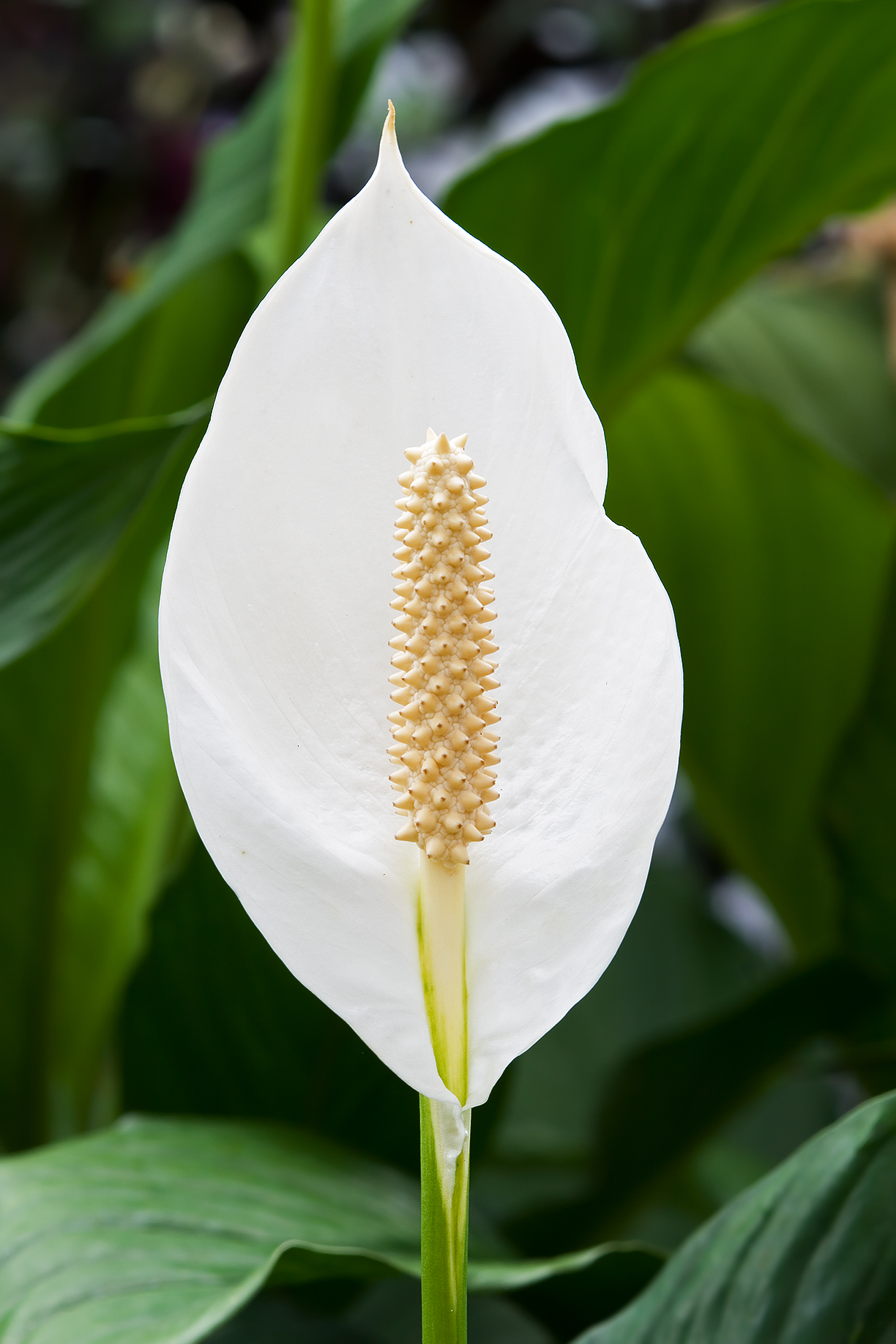
- Spathiphyllum cochlearispathum

Scientific classification
- Kingdom: Plantae
- Clade: Tracheophytes
- Clade: Angiosperms
- Clade: Monocots
- Order: Alismatales
- Family: Araceae
- Subfamily: Monsteroideae
- Tribe: Spathiphylleae
- Genus: Spathiphyllum; Schott
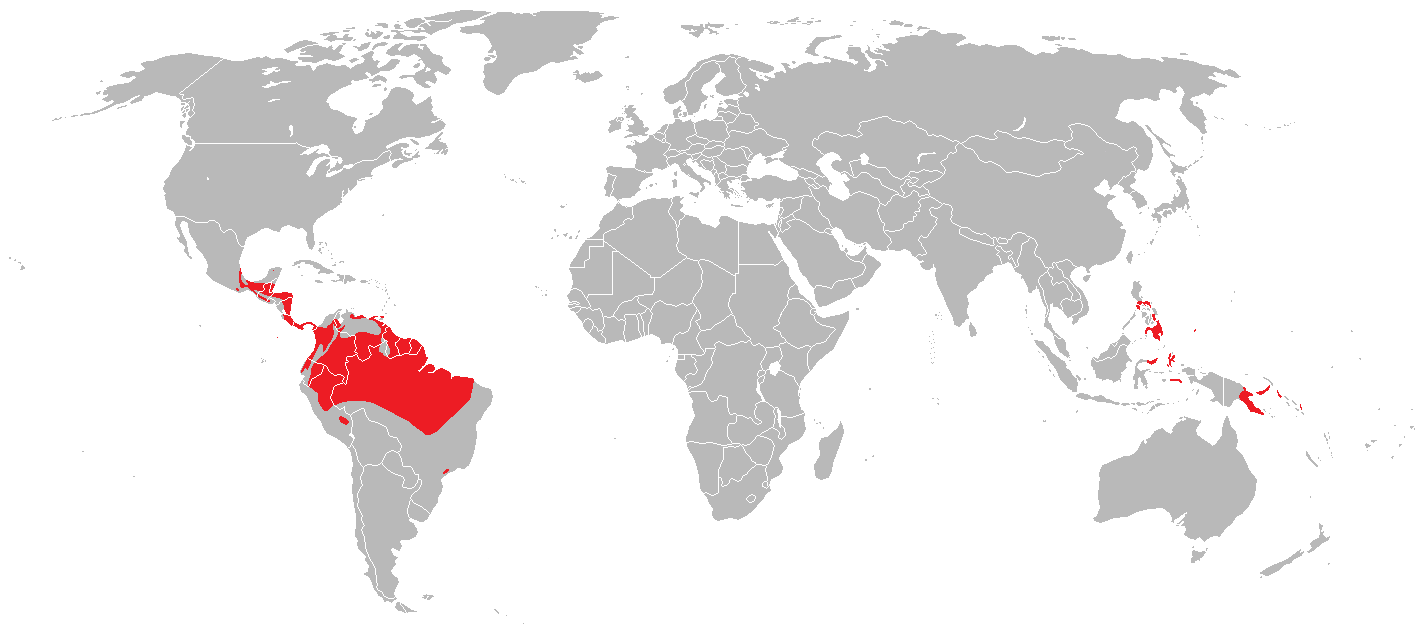
- Map of the natural distribution

Synonyms
- Hydnostachyon Liebm.; Massowia K.Koch; Spathiphyllopsis Teijsm. & Binn.; Amomophyllum Engl.; Leucochlamys Poepp. ex Engl.

= Spathiphyllum =

Genus of plants

Spathiphyllum is a genus of 59 species of monocotyledonous flowering plants in the family Araceae, native to tropical regions of the Americas and southeastern Asia. Certain species of Spathiphyllum are commonly known as spath or peace lilies.

They are evergreen herbaceous perennial plants with large leaves 12–65 centimetres (4.7–25.6 in) long and 3–25 centimetres (1.2–9.8 in) broad. The flowers are produced in a spadix, surrounded by a 10–30 centimetres (3.9–11.8 in) long, white, yellowish, or greenish spathe. The plant does not require large amounts of light or water to survive. It is most often grown as a houseplant. However, it can withstand the elements well enough to thrive when planted outdoors in hot and humid environments.

== Description ==
Spathiphyllum is a genus of herbaceous evergreen plants with dark green foliage that can reach 1 to 6 feet (0.30 to 1.83 m) in height. Rosettes of glossy, dark green leaves emerge directly from a low-lying or underground creeping stem. The leaves are elliptical or lanceolate, 4 to 25 inches (10 to 64 cm) long and 1 to 10 inches (2.5 to 25.4 cm) wide. They are supported on shoots (petioles) of shorter or similar length to the leaf.

The flowering structure rises above the foliage, with a single white or greenish-white spathe (a specialized leaf associated with the flower) partially surrounding the flower structure. The spathe is elliptical or lanceolate, and 4 to 12 inches (10 to 30 cm) long. It surrounds the spadix (a short fleshy structure that contains the male and female flower parts), which is greenish-white or cream in color, and shorter than the surrounding spathe. The spadix is covered in equal-sized flowers that contain both the male and female reproductive parts. All Spathiphyllum flowers on a given spadix mature at the same time, and produce pollen for up to four days. Pollinated flowers produce ovoid fruits that mature over four to six months, each containing up to eight seeds.

== Ecology and distribution ==
Members of Spathiphyllum are widespread in Central America and northern South America. Two species are found on Pacific islands: one on Cocos Island (S. laeve) and one in Indonesia and the Philippines (S. commutatum). They grow on the forest floors of tropical humid forests, in shady, moist or wet areas along rivers and streams, in river valleys and foothills. They often grow in colonies along waterways, and can be in places periodically inundated with water.

== Taxonomy ==
Spathiphyllum includes 59 accepted species. Several sections of the genus have also been recognized. Massowia, which includes the widespread American S. cannifolium and the Pacific S. laeve and S. commutatum; Dysspathiphyllum containing only the Colombian S. humboldtii; and the larger sections Spathiphyllum and Amomophyllum.

== Selected species ==
Species include:

- Spathiphyllum atrovirens
- Spathiphyllum bariense
- Spathiphyllum blandum
- Spathiphyllum brevirostre
- Spathiphyllum cannifolium
- Spathiphyllum cochlearispathum
- Spathiphyllum commutatum
- Spathiphyllum cuspidatum
- Spathiphyllum floribundum
- Spathiphyllum friedrichsthalii
- Spathiphyllum fulvovirens
- Spathiphyllum gardneri
- Spathiphyllum grandifolium
- Spathiphyllum jejunum
- Spathiphyllum juninense
- Spathiphyllum kalbreyeri
- Spathiphyllum kochii
- Spathiphyllum laeve
- Spathiphyllum lechlerianum
- Spathiphyllum maguirei
- Spathiphyllum mawarinumae
- Spathiphyllum monachinoi
- Spathiphyllum montanum
- Spathiphyllum neblinae
- Spathiphyllum ortgiesii
- Spathiphyllum patini
- Spathiphyllum perezii
- Spathiphyllum phryniifolium
- Spathiphyllum quindiuense
- Spathiphyllum silvicola
- Spathiphyllum solomonense
- Spathiphyllum wallisii
- Spathiphyllum wendlandii

Cultivated hybrids include:

- Spathiphyllum × clevelandii

== Cultivation and uses ==
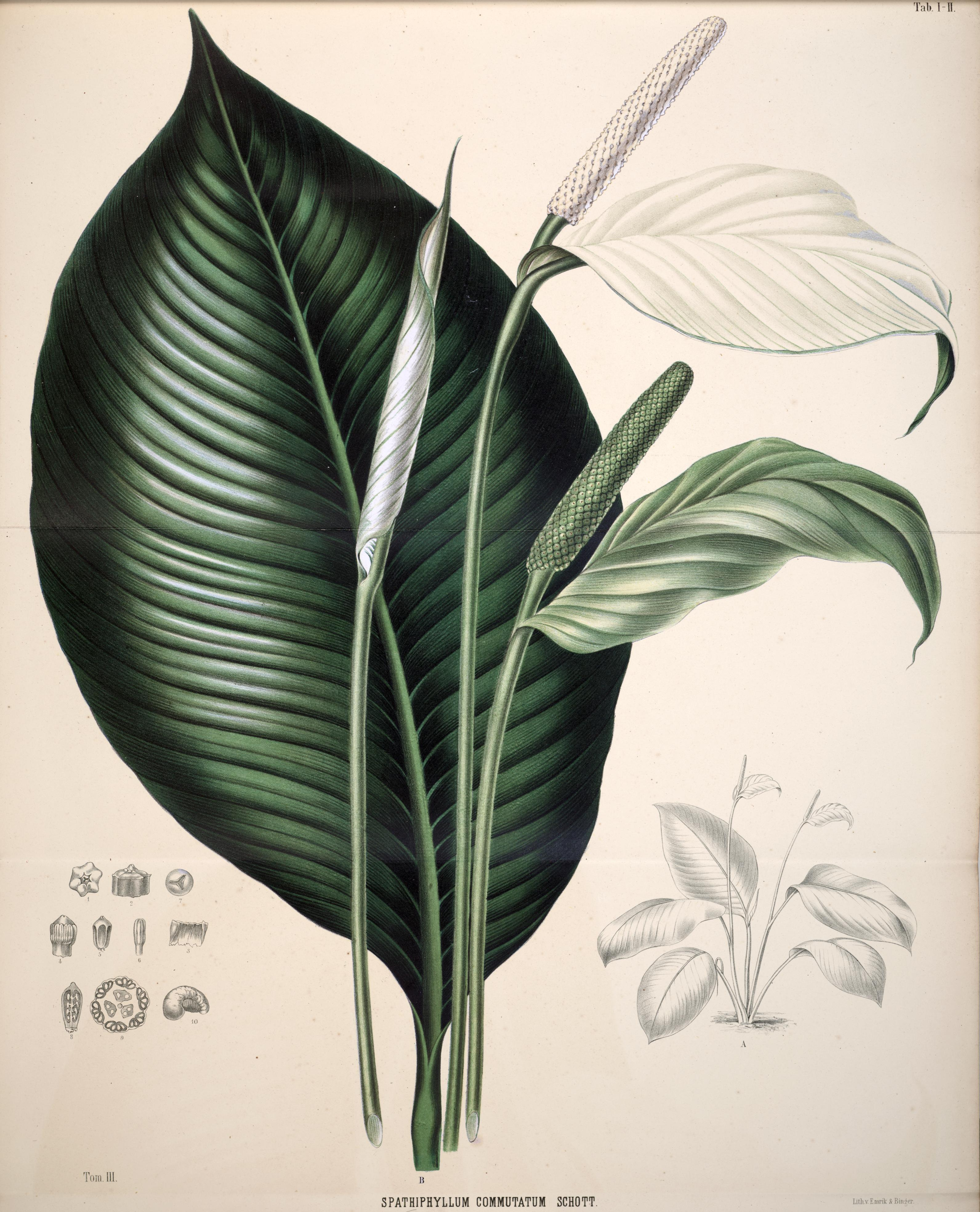
Spathiphyllum commutatum illustration showing dark foliage and contrasting white flowers.

Spathiphyllum are popular houseplants due to their attractive dark foliage and contrasting white flowers, easy care, and variety of cultivars available of different sizes. Commercially, Spathiphyllum plants are typically propagated by plant tissue culture, then potted up to multi-well plastic trays, then on into larger containers containing peat, pine bark, vermiculite, and/or coir. Plants grow best between 70 and 90 °F (21 and 32 °C). Once at a size ready for sale, plants are sprayed with gibberellic acid, which induces flowering 9 to 12 weeks after a single treatment.

It lives best in shade and needs little sunlight to thrive, and is watered approximately once a week. The soil is best left moist but only needs watering if the soil is dry.

The cultivar 'Mauna Loa' has won the Royal Horticultural Society's Award of Garden Merit.

At least one Spathiphyllum is used as food. The young spadix of S. matudae is pickled in vinegar, or cooked with eggs.

== Toxicity ==
Although it is called a "lily", the peace lily is not a true lily from the family Liliaceae. True lilies are highly toxic (poisonous) to cats and dogs, but the peace lily, Spathiphyllum is only mildly toxic to humans and other animals when ingested. Like many Araceae, it contains calcium oxalate crystals, which can cause skin irritation, a burning sensation in the mouth, difficulty swallowing, and nausea, but it does not contain the toxins found in true lilies, which can cause acute kidney failure in cats and some other animals.

== Diseases ==
Infection of peace lilies with Botrytis cinerea was first documented in Tokyo, Japan from 1989 to 1994. Myrothecium roridum has also been used to harden in vitro cultures of the plant. Alternaria alternata leaf rot was documented on peace lilies in Argentina in 2008.

== History ==
Heinrich Wilhelm Schott formally described the genus Spathiphyllum – literally "leaf spathe" – in his and Stephan Endlicher's 1832 book Meletemata Botanica. It encompassed two species: S. lanceifolium (previously described as Dracontium lanceaefolium by Nikolaus Joseph von Jacquin in 1790) and S. sagittaefolium. Examinations of similar specimens by others resulted in new genera: Frederik Liebmann's Hydnostachyon in 1849 and Karl Koch's Massowia in 1852. Schott redefined Spathiphyllum in 1853, moving S. sagittaefolium into the new genus Urospatha, and claiming Massowia and Hydnostachyon to be more appropriately Spathiphyllum. Just five years later, Schott's Prodromus Systematis Aroidearum expanded Spathiphyllum to 22 species. From there, the genus remained relatively stable. Collections that included type specimens of many Spathiphyllum were destroyed by fire in Vienna (1945, where Schott had worked) and by war in Berlin (where Adolf Engler had described several Spathiphyllum species). George S. Bunting revised the genus as his PhD thesis work in 1960, encompassing a total 36 species.

== See also ==
- Anthurium, similar looking genus of plants in same family
- List of plants known as lily
