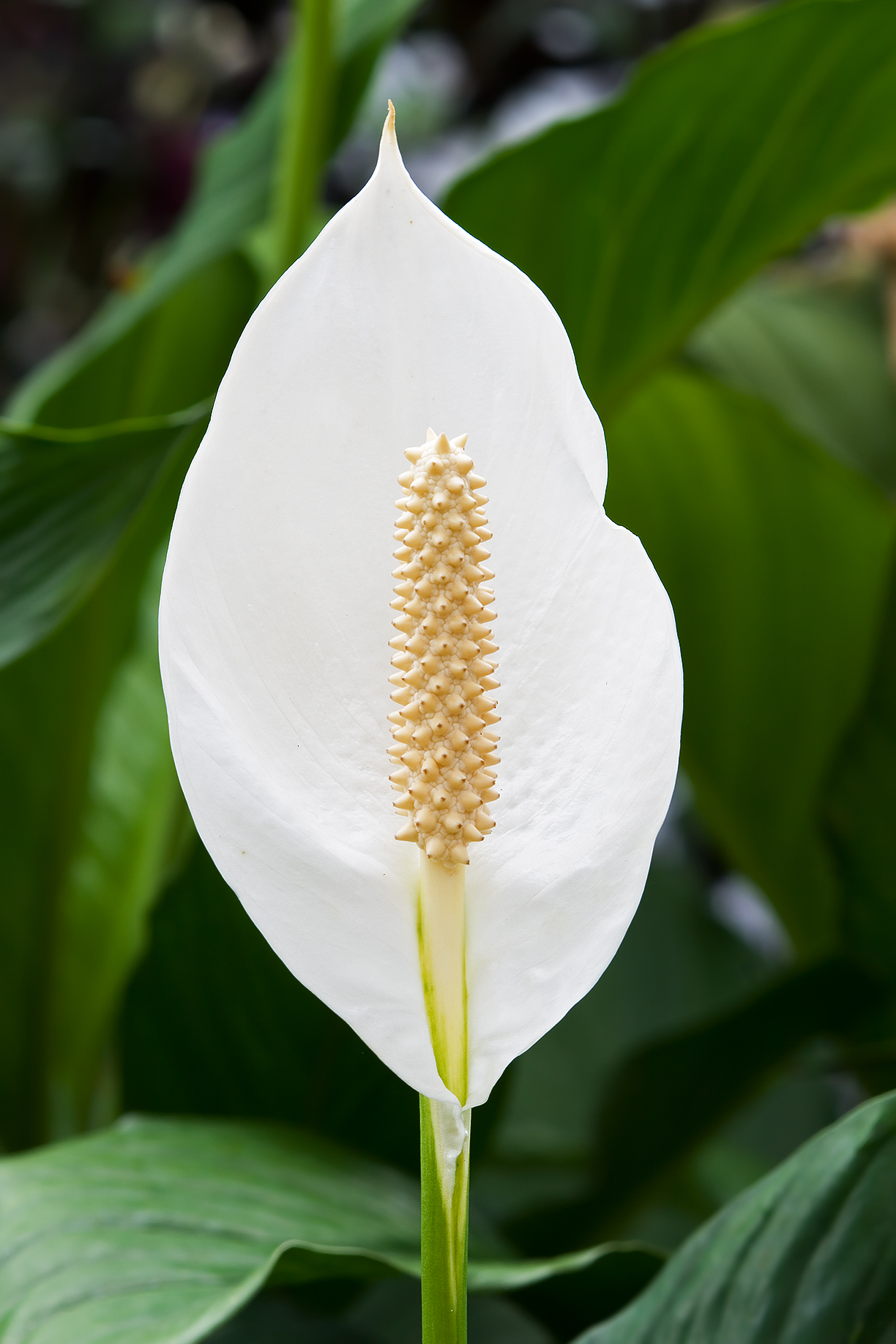

Scientific classification
- Kingdom: Plantae
- Clade: Tracheophytes
- Clade: Angiosperms
- Clade: Monocots
- Order: Alismatales
- Family: Araceae
- Genus: Spathiphyllum
- Species: S. cochlearispathum

Binomial name
- Spathiphyllum cochlearispathum (Liebm.) Engl.

Synonyms
- List: Hydnostachyon cochlearispathum Liebm.; Hydnostachyon longirostre Liebm.; Massowia heliconiifolia (Schott) K.Koch; Massowia lanceolata K.Koch; Spathiphyllum heliconiifolium Schott; Spathiphyllum lacustre Lundell; Spathiphyllum lanceolatum (K.Koch) K.Koch; Spathiphyllum liebmannii Schott; Spathiphyllum longirostre (Liebm.) Schott

= Spathiphyllum cochlearispathum =

Species of plant

Spathiphyllum cochlearispathum is a plant species in the family Araceae. It is native to southern Mexico and often cultivated. When cultivated as a houseplant, Spathiphyllum cochlearispathum is commonly called peace lily.

== Taxonomic history ==
Frederik Michael Liebmann originally described the species in a separate genus Hydnostachyon, which he described as having a concave (spoon-like) spathe Spatha foliacea persistens cochleariformis, from which he formed the species epithet cochlearispathum. The species was moved to the genus Spathiphyllum by Heinrich Gustav Adolf Engler.

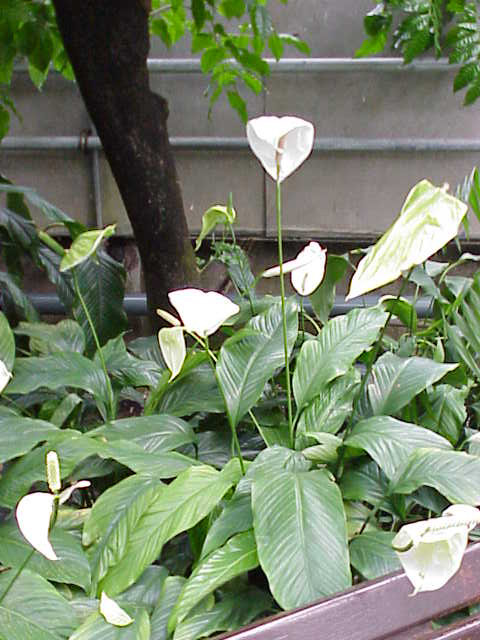

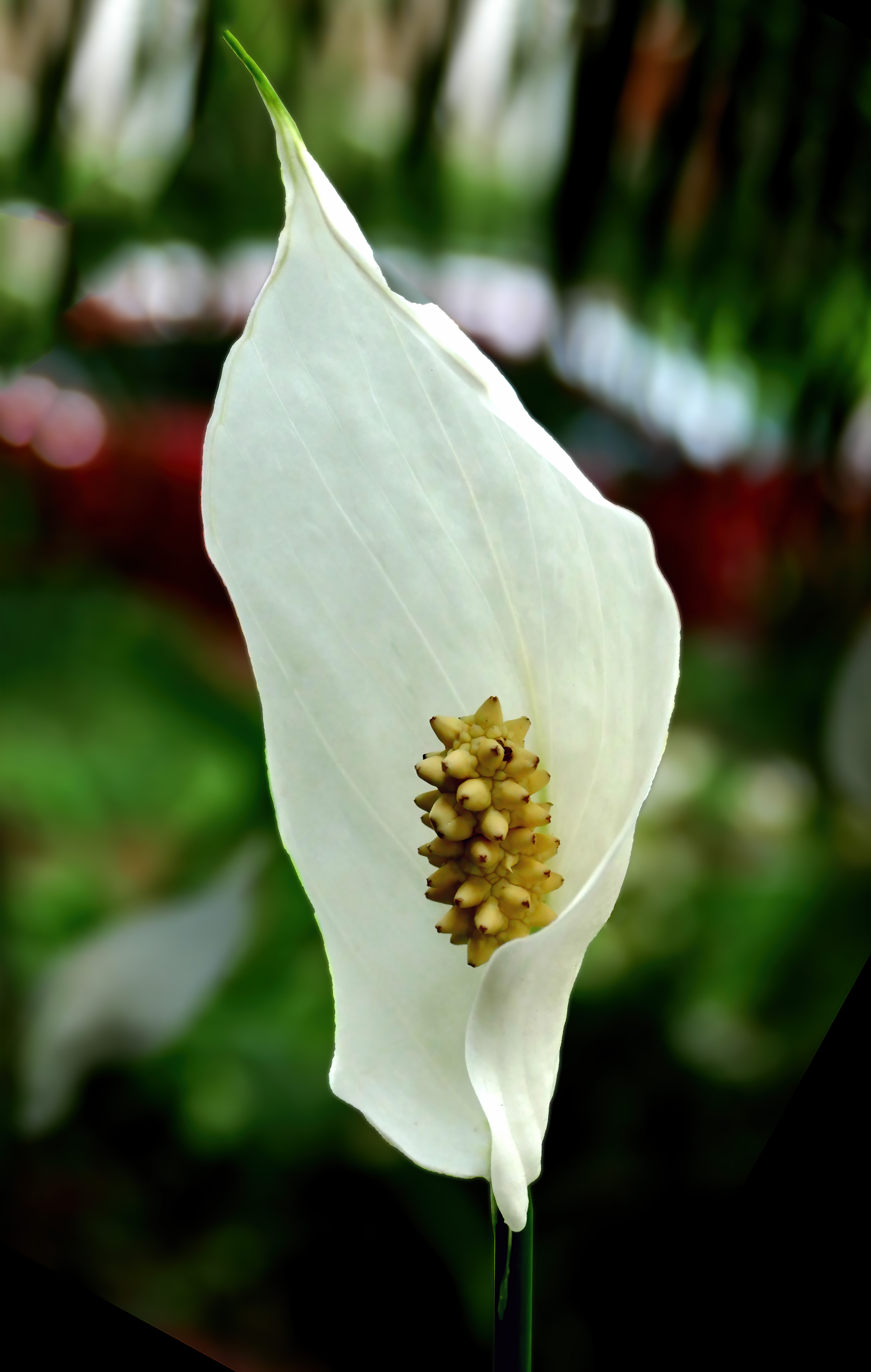

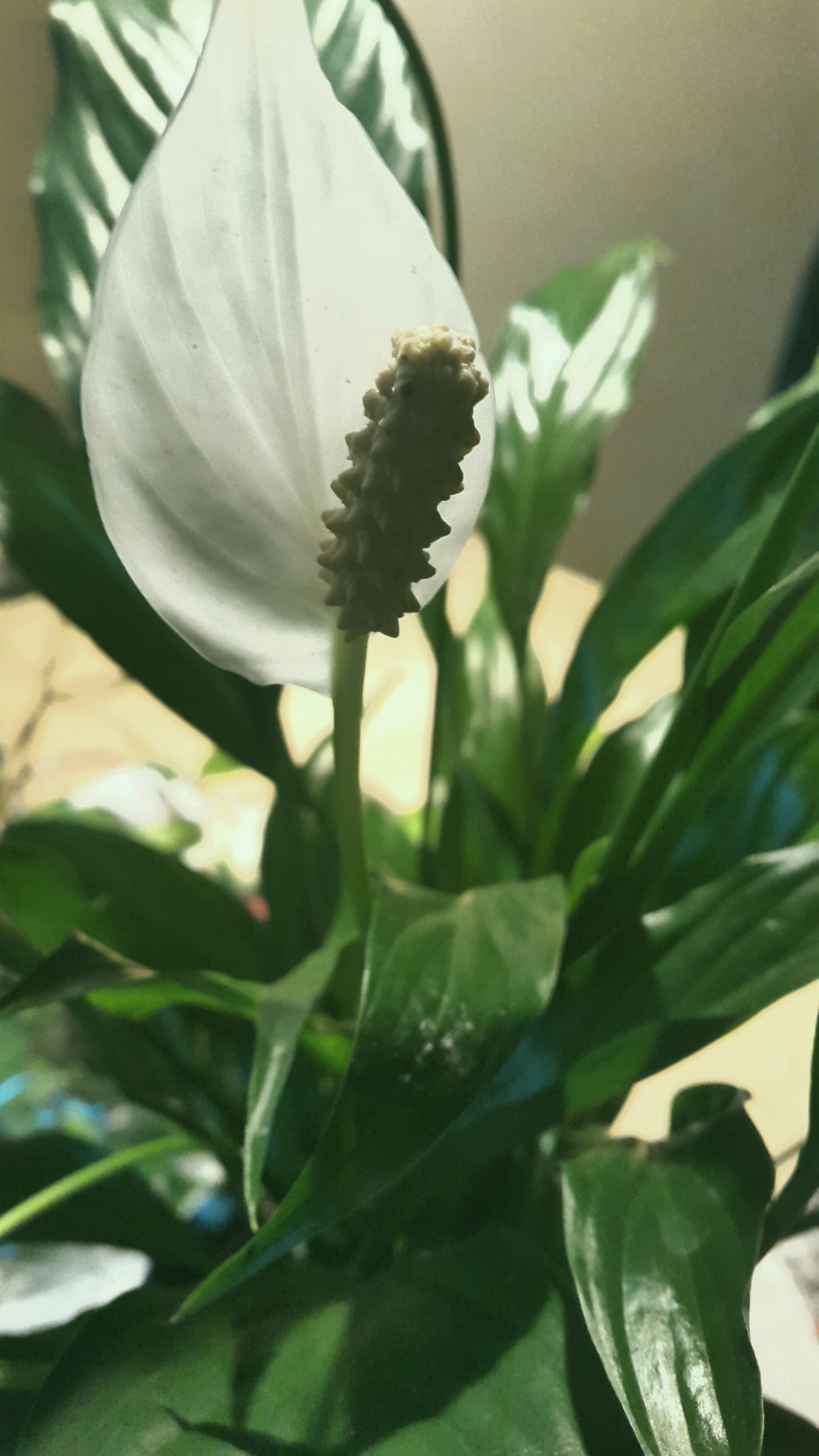

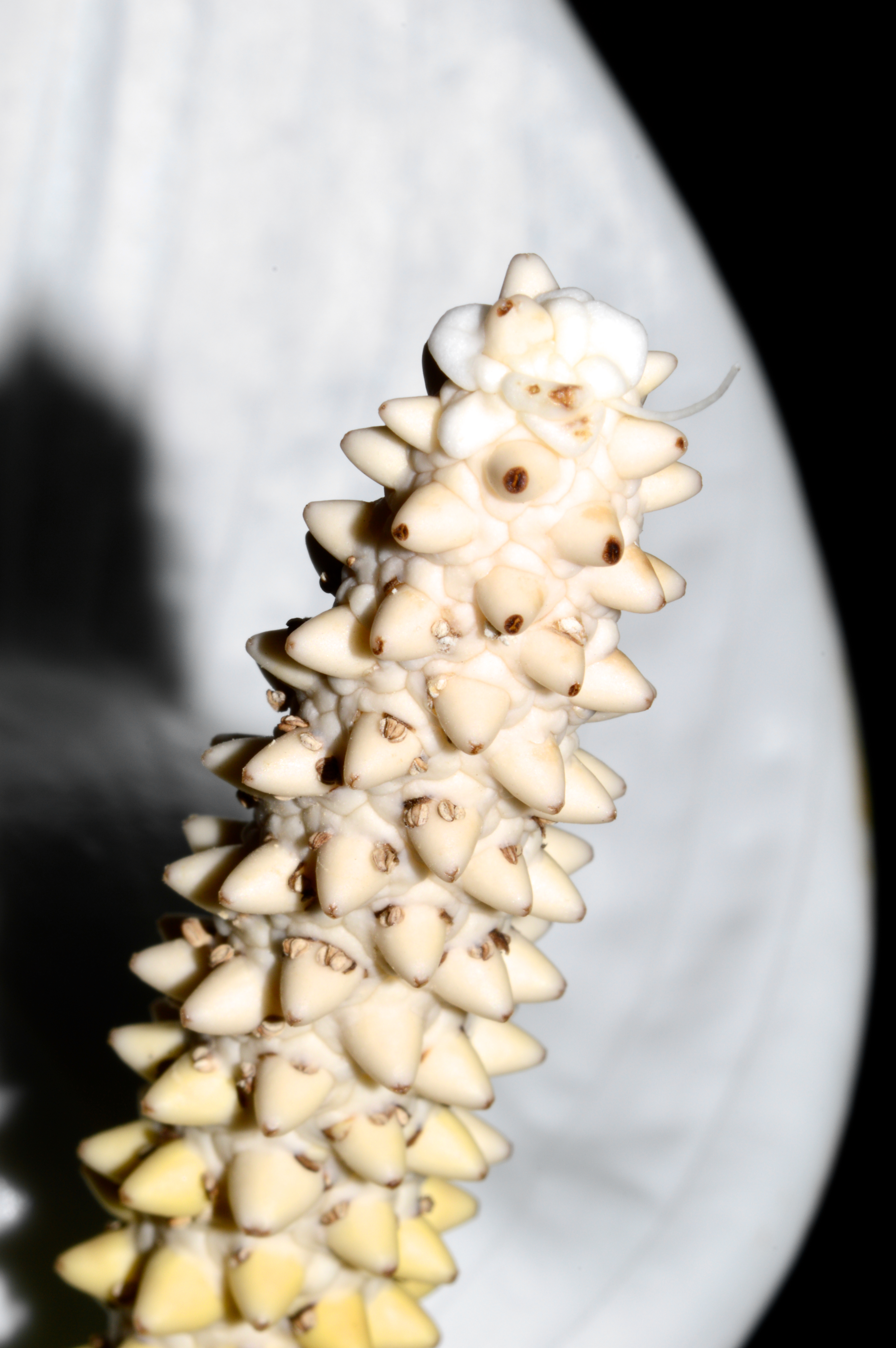

== Care instructions ==
Water only once soil is dry and the plant begins to wilt, then saturate the soil. The peace lily likes light, but absolutely no direct sunlight, not even for short periods.
