= Spadix (botany) =

Type of inflorescence

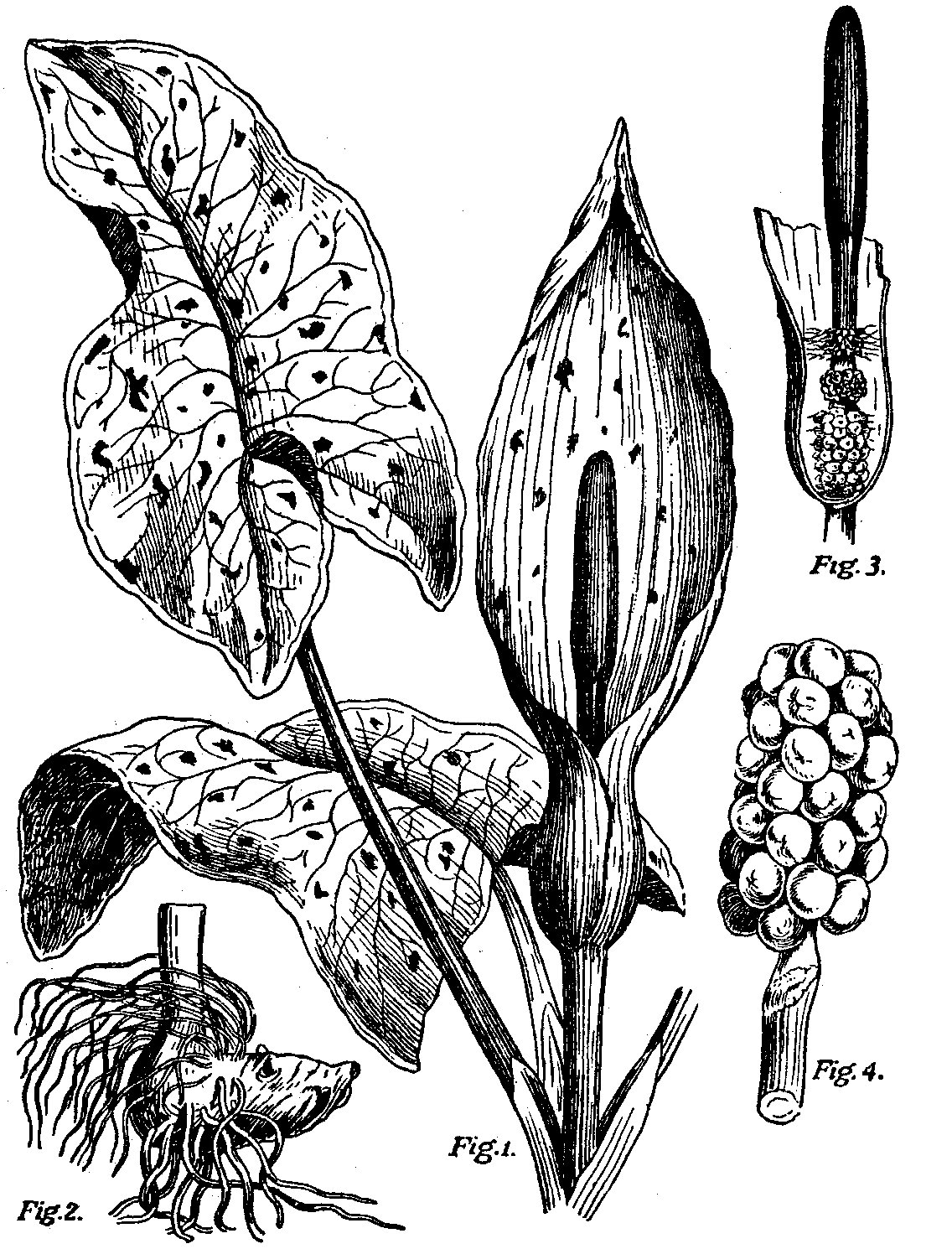
1. Leaves and Inflorescence of the Arum maculatum, 2. Underground root-stock, 3. Lower part of spathe cut open, 4. Spike of fruits- showing in succession (from below) female flowers, male flowers, and sterile flowers forming a ring of hairs borne on the spadix.

Diagram of spadix

In botany, a spadix (pl.: spadices) is a type of inflorescence having small flowers borne on a fleshy stem. Spadices are typical of the family Araceae, the arums or aroids. The spadix is typically surrounded by a leaf-like curved bract known as a spathe. For example, the "flower" of the well known Anthurium spp. is a typical spadix with a large colorful spathe.

In this type of inflorescence, the peduncle is thick, long and fleshy, having small sessile unisexual flowers covered with one or more large green or colourful bracts (spathe). Spadix inflorescence is found in colocasia, aroids, maize and palms (palms have compound spadix).

Monoecious aroids have unisexual male and female flowers on the same individual and the spadix is usually organized with female flowers towards the bottom and male flowers towards the top. Typically, the stigmas are no longer receptive when pollen is released which prevents self-fertilization.

In the compound spadix inflorescence, the axis is branched. Usually the whole inflorescence is covered by a stiff boat-shaped hood, for example the coconut (palms).

In many arums with unisexual (imperfect) spadices, the upper portion of the spadix contains infertile male flowers and is referred to as the appendix. The appendix in certain species, such as Amorphophallus paeoniifolius, is enlarged, highly modified and shows variability in shape. In Arum maculatum the appendix length increases more rapidly with total spadix length than either the male or female zones.

Male florets and the appendix may participate in thermogenesis. The appendix may have additional specializations for odorant production.

== Gallery ==
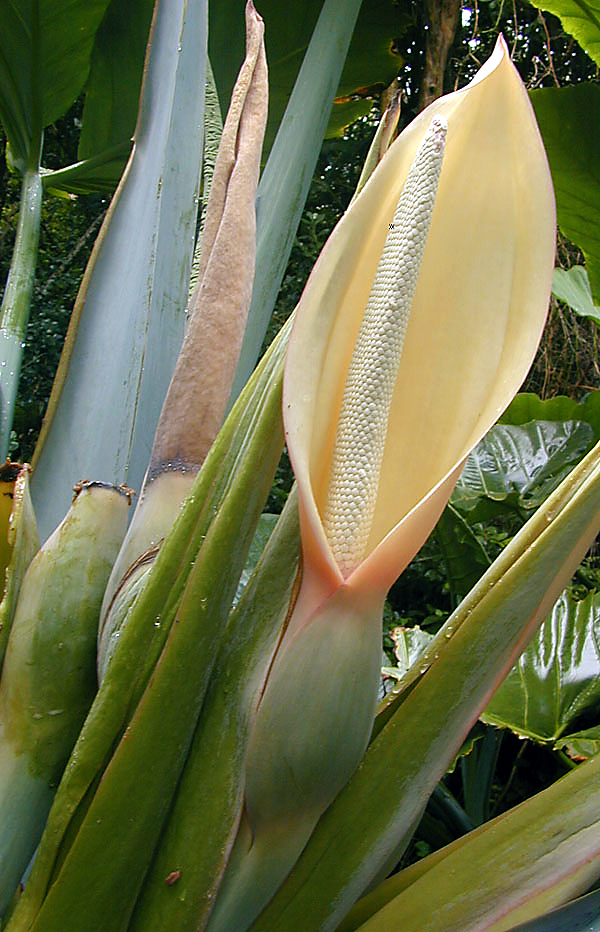
Elephant ear or ape flower (Xanthosoma sagittifolium) with a white spadix partially surrounded by a green-, rose-, and cream-colored spathe

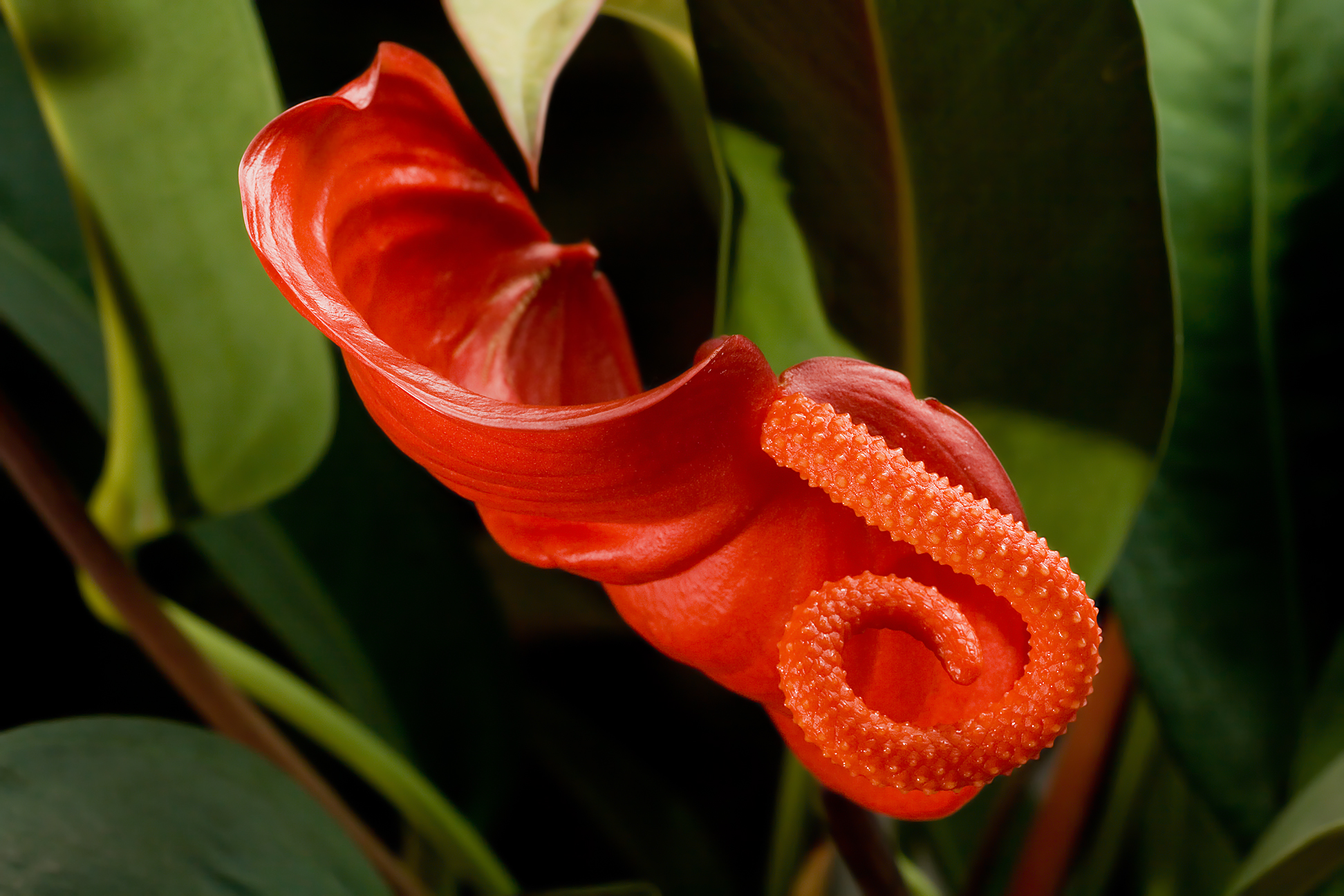
Anthurium scherzerianum inflorescence with spathe and spadix

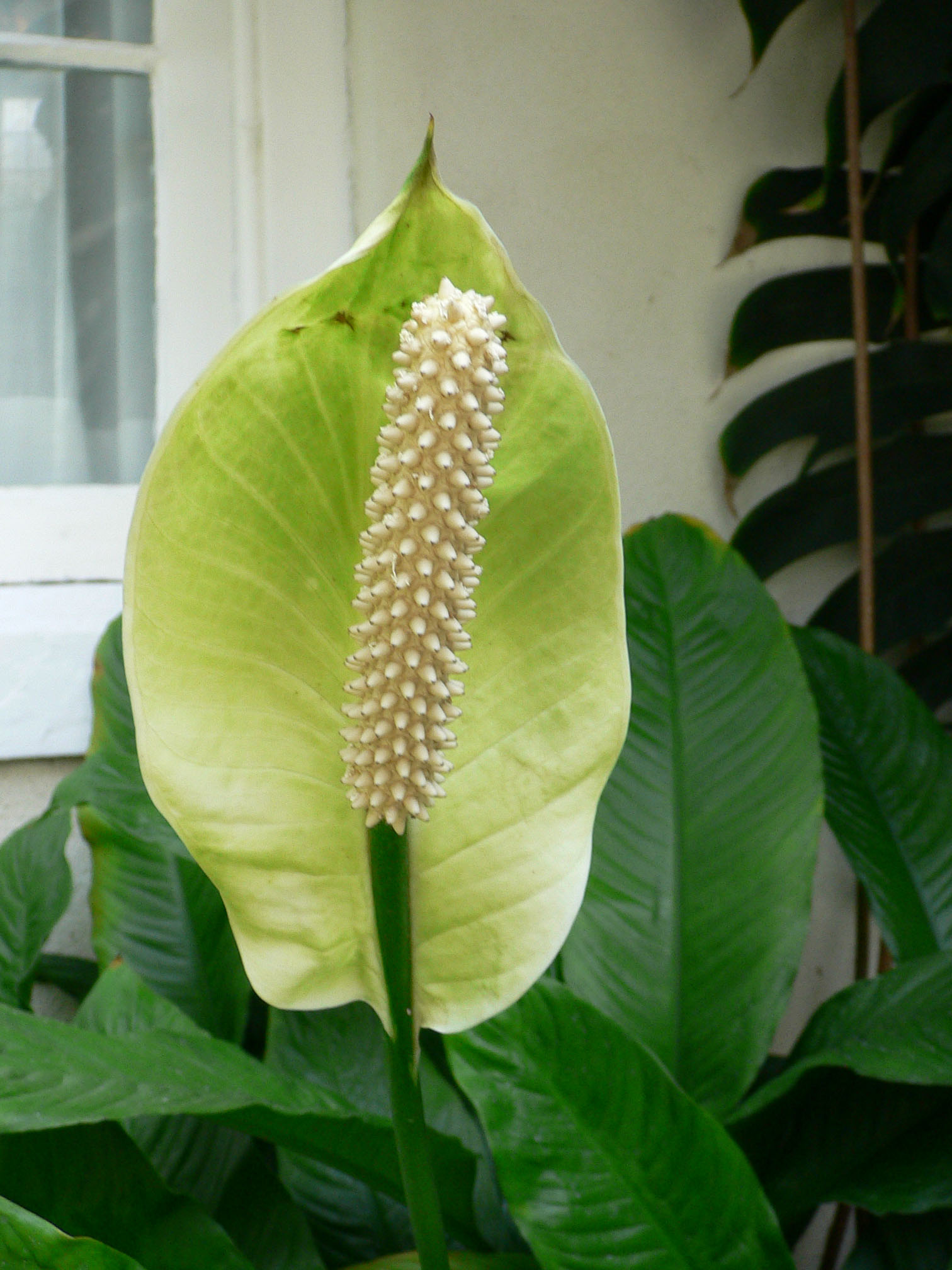
Spadix of Spathiphyllum floribundum

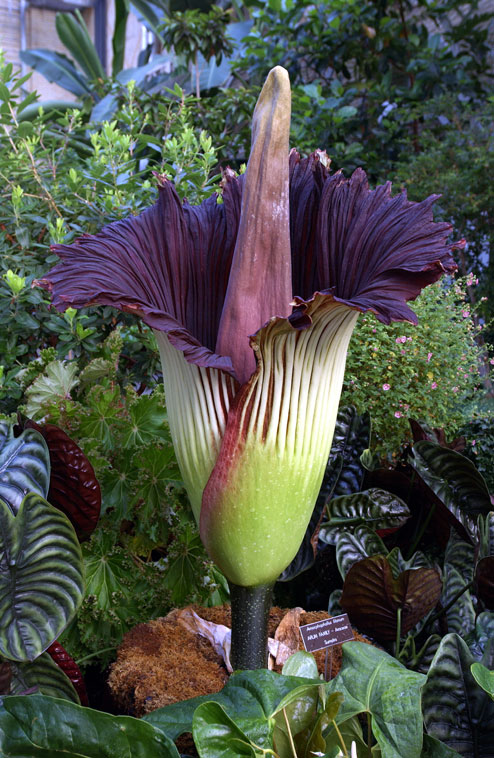
Titan arum (Amorphophallus titanum) spadix at the United States Botanic Garden

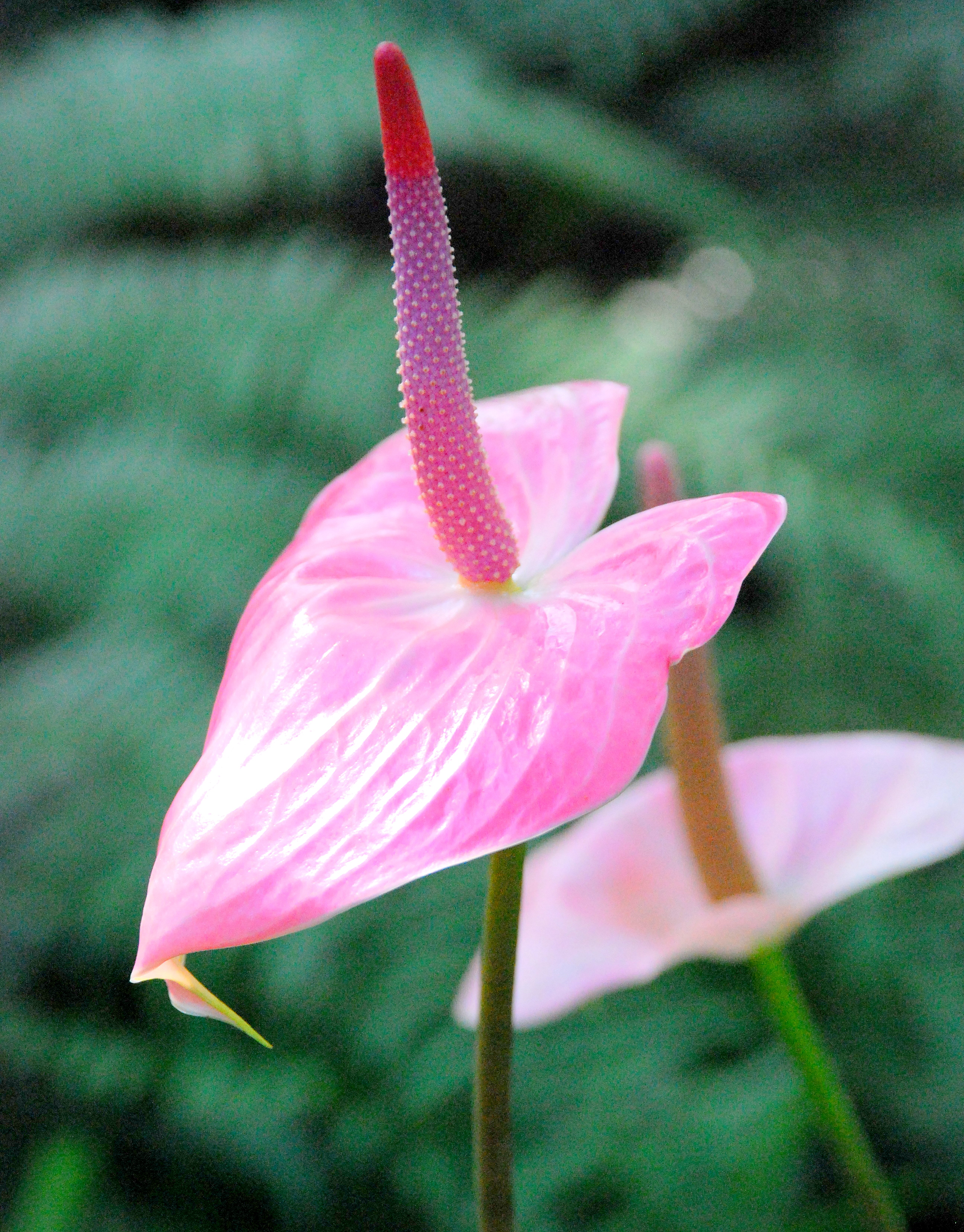
Flamingo Lily (Anthurium andraeanum) at the United States Botanic Garden

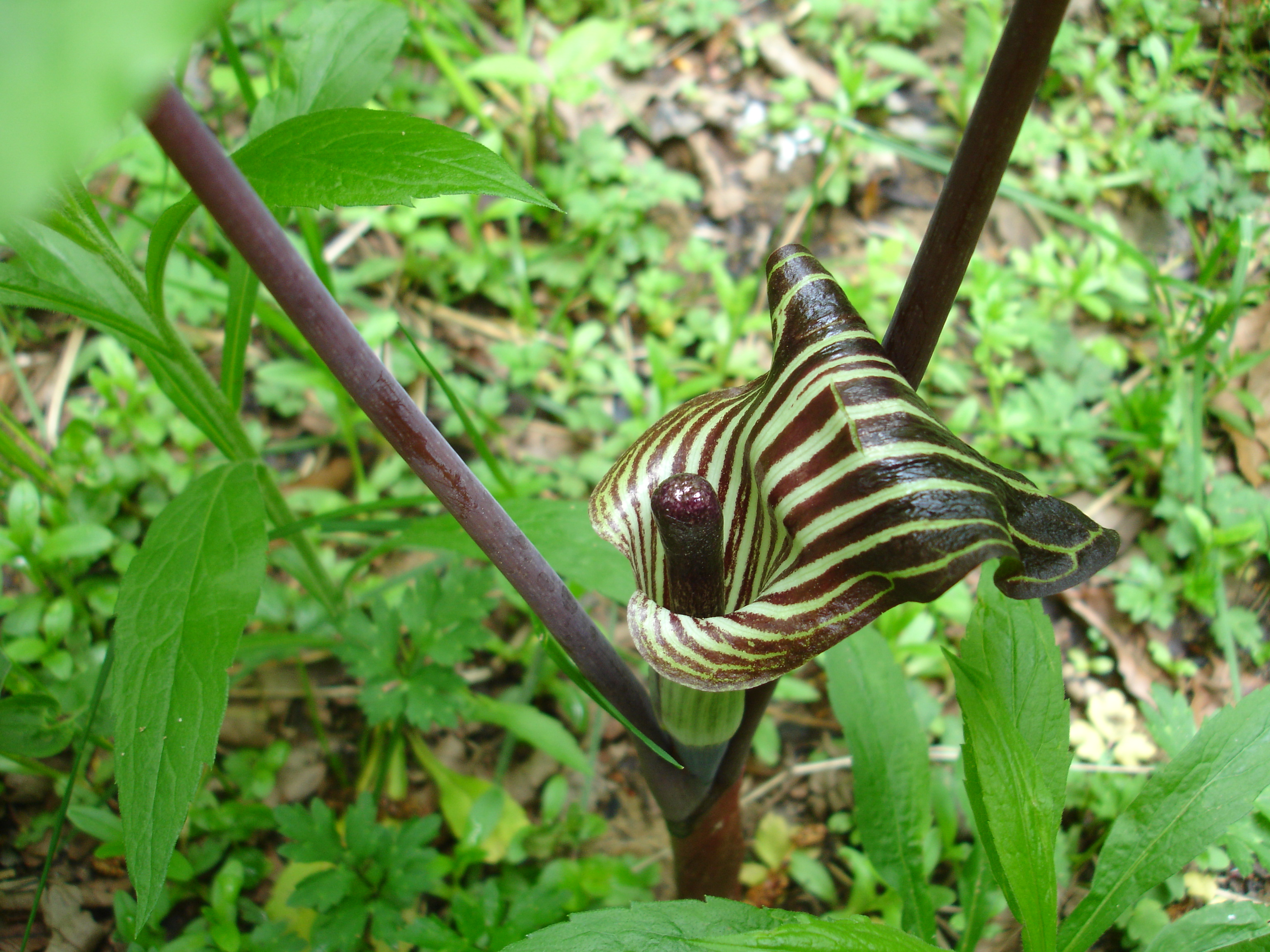
Jack in the Pulpit (Arisaema triphyllum) in the Allegheny National Forest, Pennsylvania)

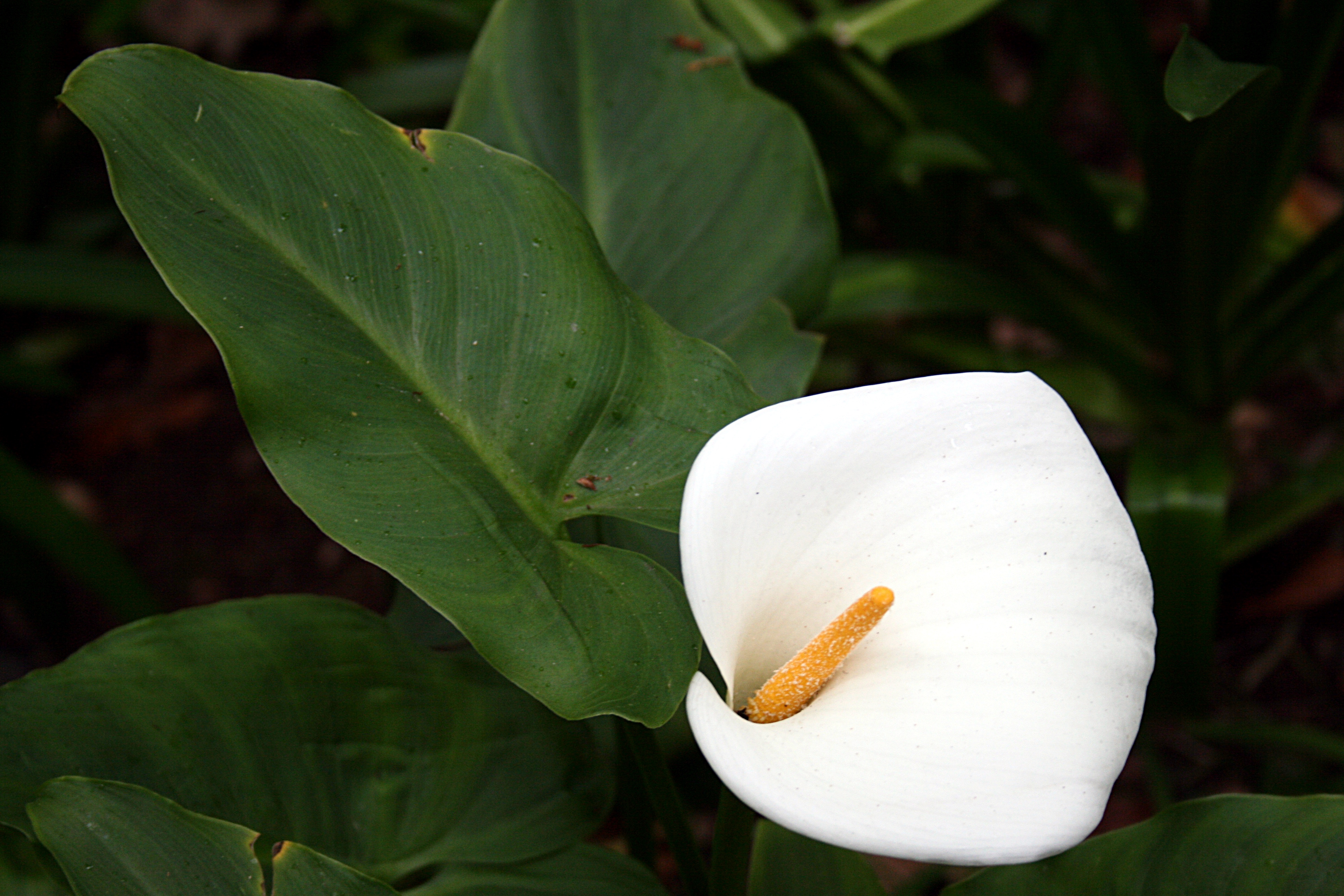
Calla lily (Zantedeschia aethiopica) in Funchal, Madeira

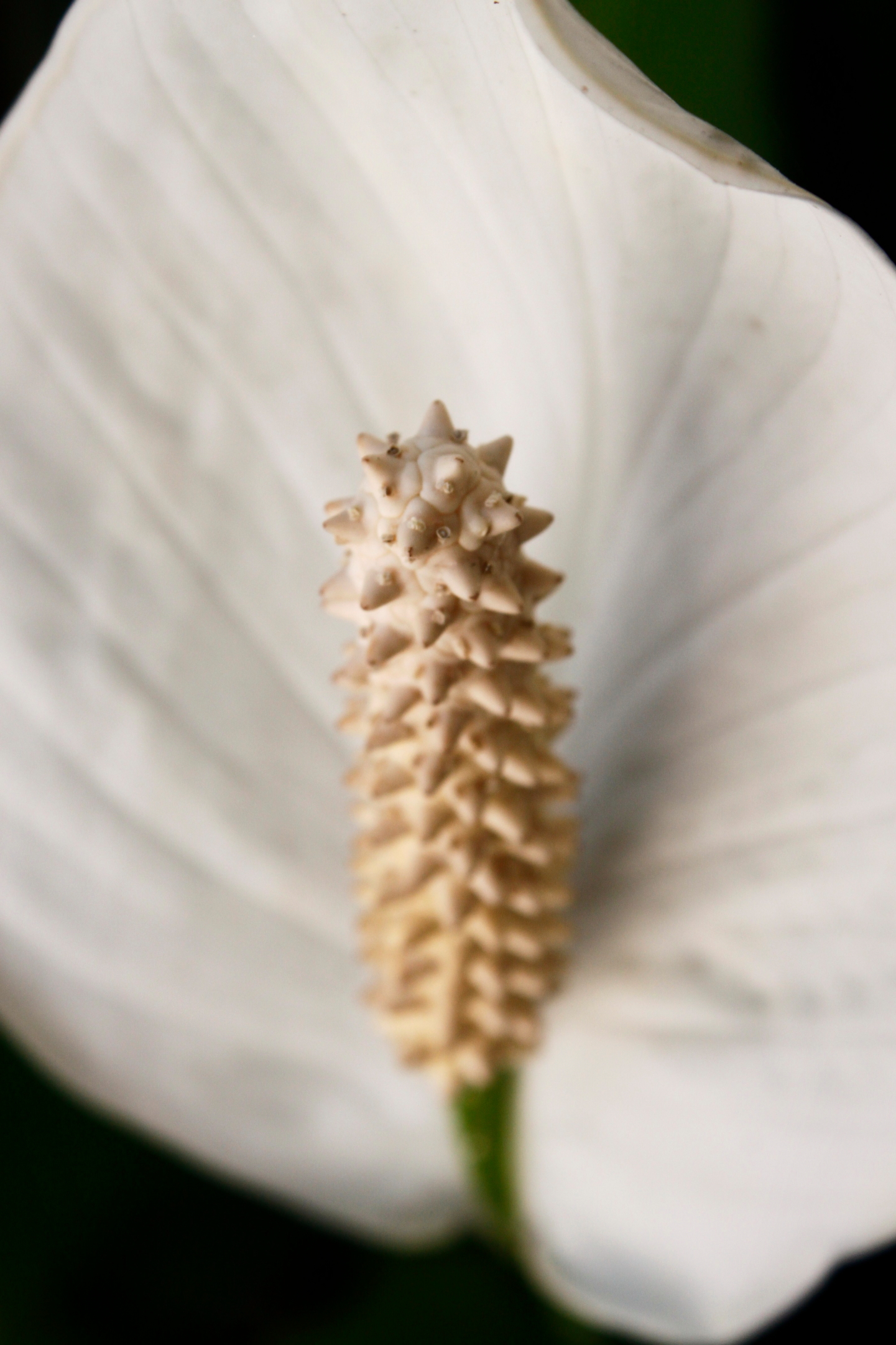
Spadix of Spathiphyllum in Brazil

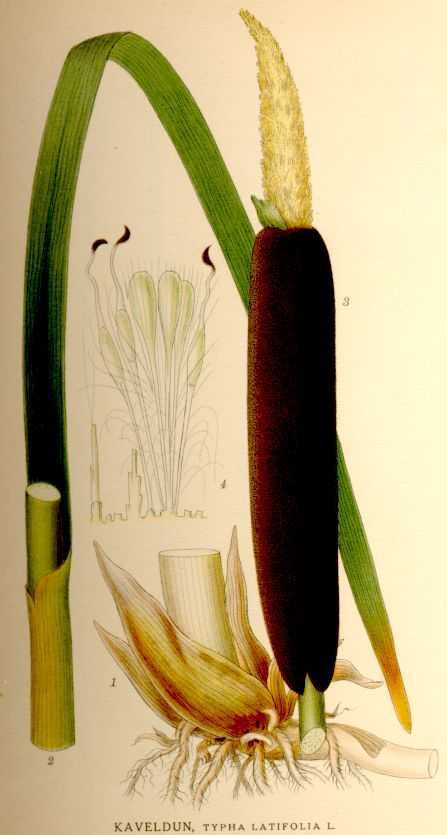
Spadix of Typha latifolia

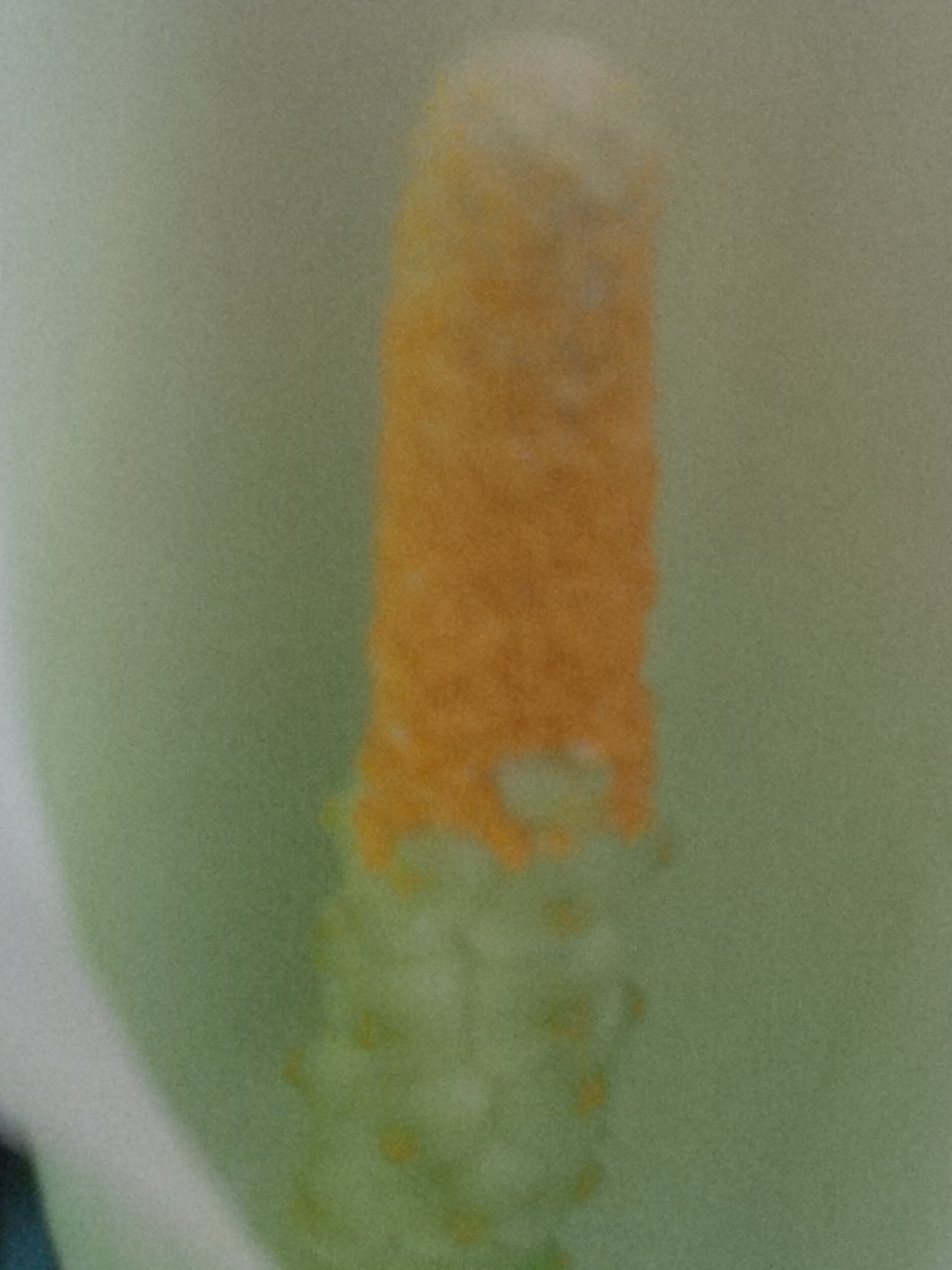
Spadix of Zantedeschia elliottiana cultivar showing male flowers above with pollen and female below

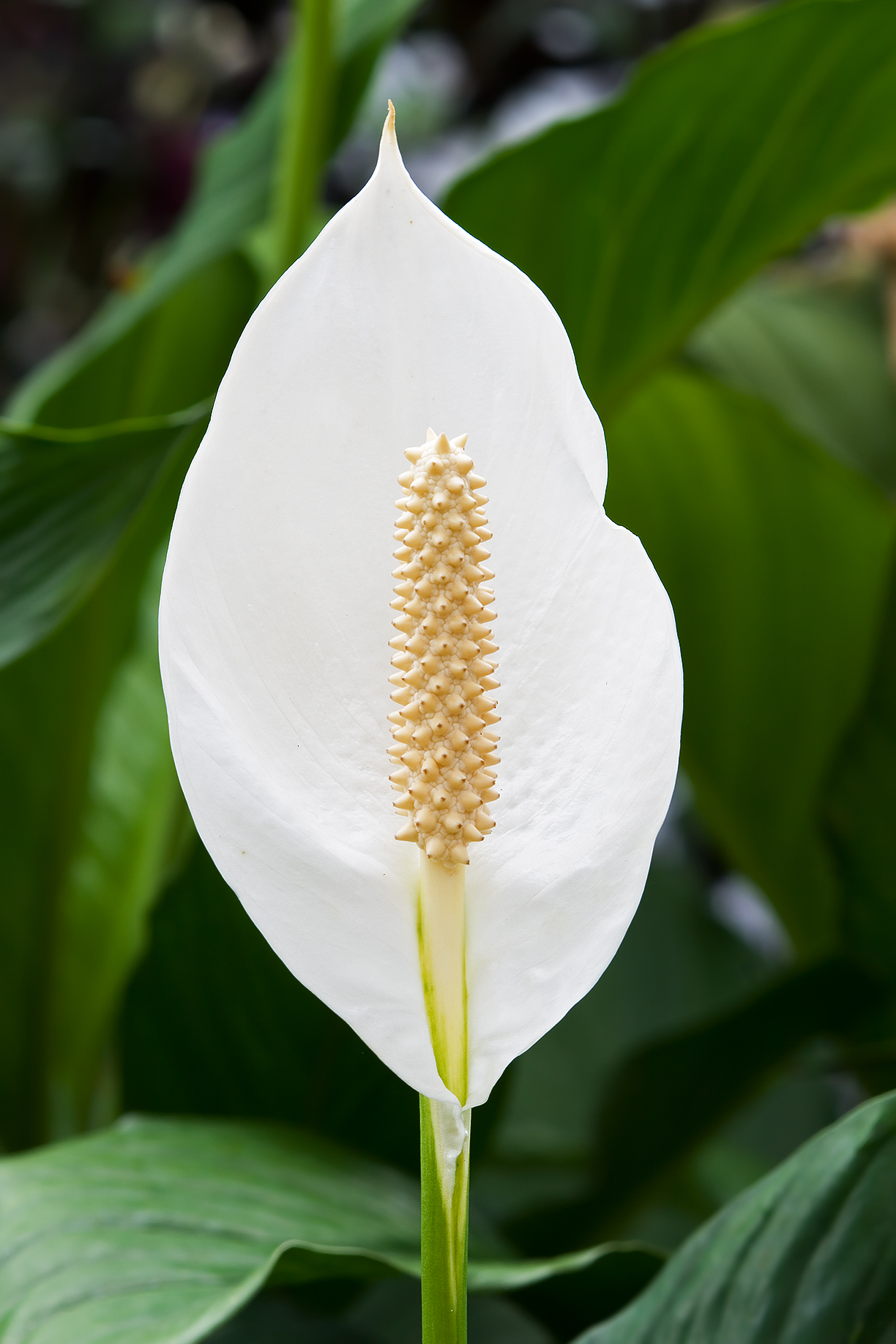
Peace lily (Spathiphyllum cochlearispathum) clearly showing the characteristic spadix and spathe of the genus

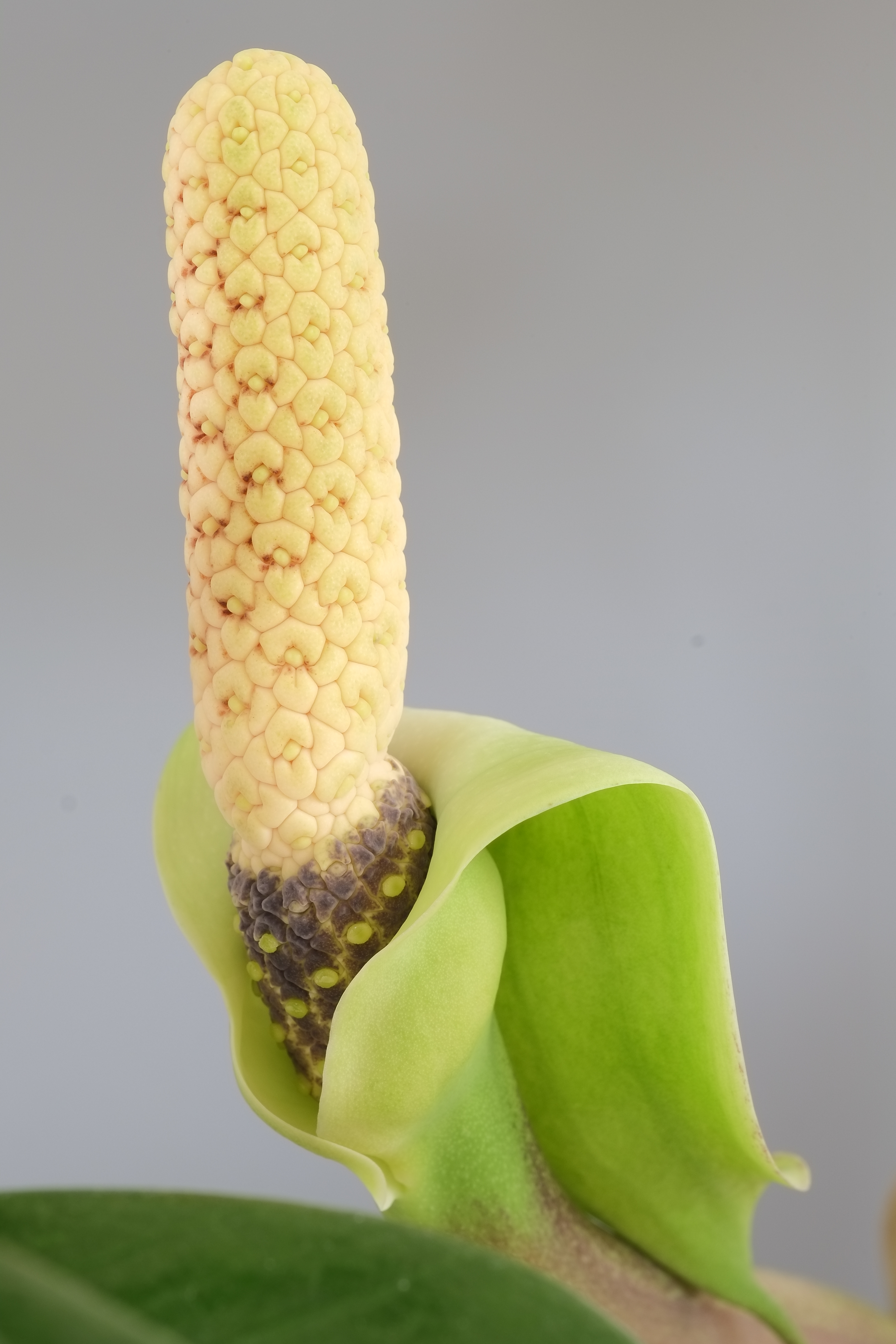
Spadix of ZZ plant (Zamioculcas zamiifolia) with curled back spathe
