= Skunk cabbage =

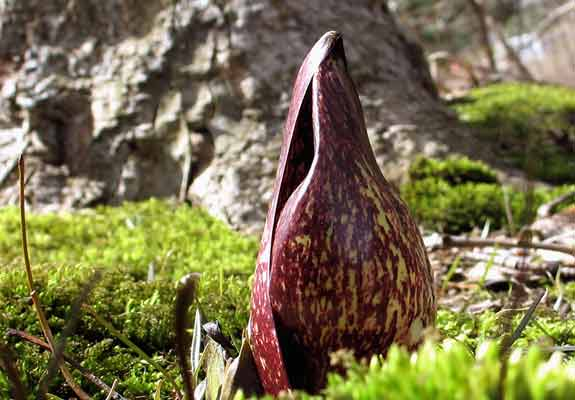
The bloom of the eastern skunk cabbage, Symplocarpus foetidus, in the spring, before leafing

Skunk cabbage is a common name for several plants and may refer to:

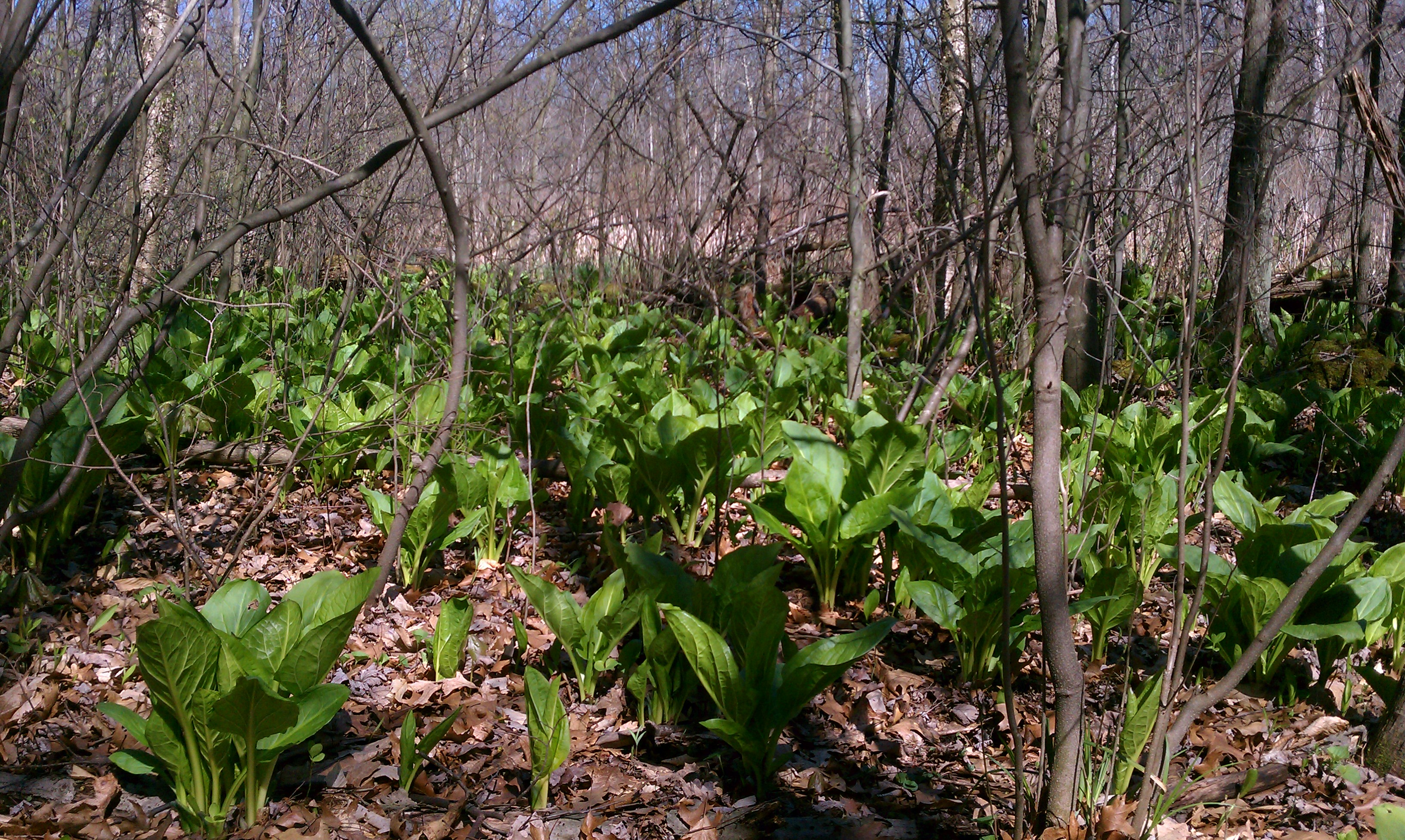
The bloom of the eastern skunk cabbage, Symplocarpus foetidus, in the spring, before leafing

- the genus Lysichiton
  - Asian skunk cabbage, Lysichiton camtschatcensis, grows in eastern Asia
  - Western skunk cabbage, Lysichiton americanus, grows in western North America
- Eastern skunk cabbage, Symplocarpus foetidus, grows in eastern North America
- Veratrum californicum (California corn lily, white or California false hellebore), locally called skunk cabbage, grows in western North America
