= Thermogenic plant =

Plants that can produce heat

Thermogenic plants have the ability to raise their temperature above that of the surrounding air. Heat is generated in the mitochondria, as a secondary process of cellular respiration called thermogenesis. Alternative oxidase and uncoupling proteins similar to those found in mammals enable the process, which is still poorly understood.

== The role of thermogenesis ==
Botanists are not completely sure why thermogenic plants generate large amounts of excess heat, but most agree that it has something to do with increasing pollination rates. The most widely accepted theory states that the endogenous heat helps in spreading chemicals that attract pollinators to the plant. For example, the Voodoo lily uses heat to help spread its smell of rotting meat. This smell draws in flies which begin to search for the source of the smell. As they search the entire plant for the dead carcass, they pollinate the plant.

Other theories state that the heat may provide a heat reward for the pollinator: pollinators are drawn to the flower for its warmth. This theory has less support because most thermogenic plants are found in tropical climates.

Yet another theory is that the heat helps protect against frost damage, allowing the plant to germinate and sprout earlier than otherwise. For example, the skunk cabbage generates heat, which allows it to melt its way through a layer of snow in early spring. The heat, however, is mostly used to help spread its pungent odor and attract pollinators.

Some species of cycads, notably the genus Zamia, have been found to perform thermogenesis in order to communicate with pollinators directly via thermal radiation, predating the use of pigments for communication.

== Characteristics of thermogenic plants ==
Most thermogenic plants tend to be rather large. This is because the smaller plants do not have enough volume to create a considerable amount of heat. Large plants, on the other hand, have a lot of mass to create and retain heat.

Thermogenic plants are also protogynous, meaning that the female part of the plant matures before the male part of the same plant. This reduces inbreeding considerably, as such a plant can be fertilized only by pollen from a different plant. This is why thermogenic plants release pungent odors to attract pollinating insects.

== Examples ==
Thermogenic plants are found in a variety of families, but the Araceae in particular contains many such species. Examples from this family include the dead-horse arum (Helicodiceros muscivorus), the eastern skunk cabbage (Symplocarpus foetidus), the elephant foot yam (Amorphophallus paeoniifolius), elephant ear (Philodendron selloum), lords-and-ladies (Arum maculatum), and voodoo lily (Typhonium venosum). The titan arum (Amorphophallus titanum) uses thermogenically created water vapor to disperse its scent—that of rotting meat—above the cold air that settles over it at night in its natural habitat. Contrary to popular belief, the western skunk cabbage (Lysichiton americanus), a close relative from the family Araceae, is not thermogenic. Outside Araceae, the sacred lotus (Nelumbo nucifera) is thermogenic and endothermic, able to regulate flower temperature to within a certain range, an ability shared by the unrelated parasitic plant Rhizanthes lowii.

== Heat production ==
Many endothermic plant species rely on alternative oxidase (AOX), which is an enzyme in the mitochondria organelle and is a part of the electron transport chain. The reduction of mitochondrial redox potential by alternative oxidase increases unproductive respiration. This metabolic process creates an excess of heat which warms thermogenic tissue or organs. Plants containing this alternative oxidase are unaffected by the effects of cyanide because AOX acts as electron acceptor collecting electrons from ubiquinol while bypassing the third electron complex. The AOX enzyme then reduces oxygen molecules to water without the presence of a proton gradient which in turn is very inefficient yielding a drop in free energy from Ubiquinol to oxygen which is released in heat.
