= Symplocarpus nabekuraensis =

Scientific classification
- Kingdom: Plantae
- Clade: Tracheophytes
- Clade: Angiosperms
- Clade: Monocots
- Order: Alismatales
- Family: Araceae
- Genus: Symplocarpus
- Species: S. nabekuraensis

Binomial name
- Symplocarpus nabekuraensis Otsuka & K.Inoue

Species of flowering plant

Symplocarpus nabekuraensis Is a plant in the genus Symplocarpus. It is found in Japan.

== Description ==
As with other plants in the genus Symplocarpus, Symplocarpus nabekuraensis has large leaves that release a foul odor when damaged. Symplocarpus nabekuraensis also has a deep root system.

== Distribution ==
Symplocarpus nabekuraensis is found in the Honshu region of Japan.

== See also ==
- Symplocarpus foetidus
