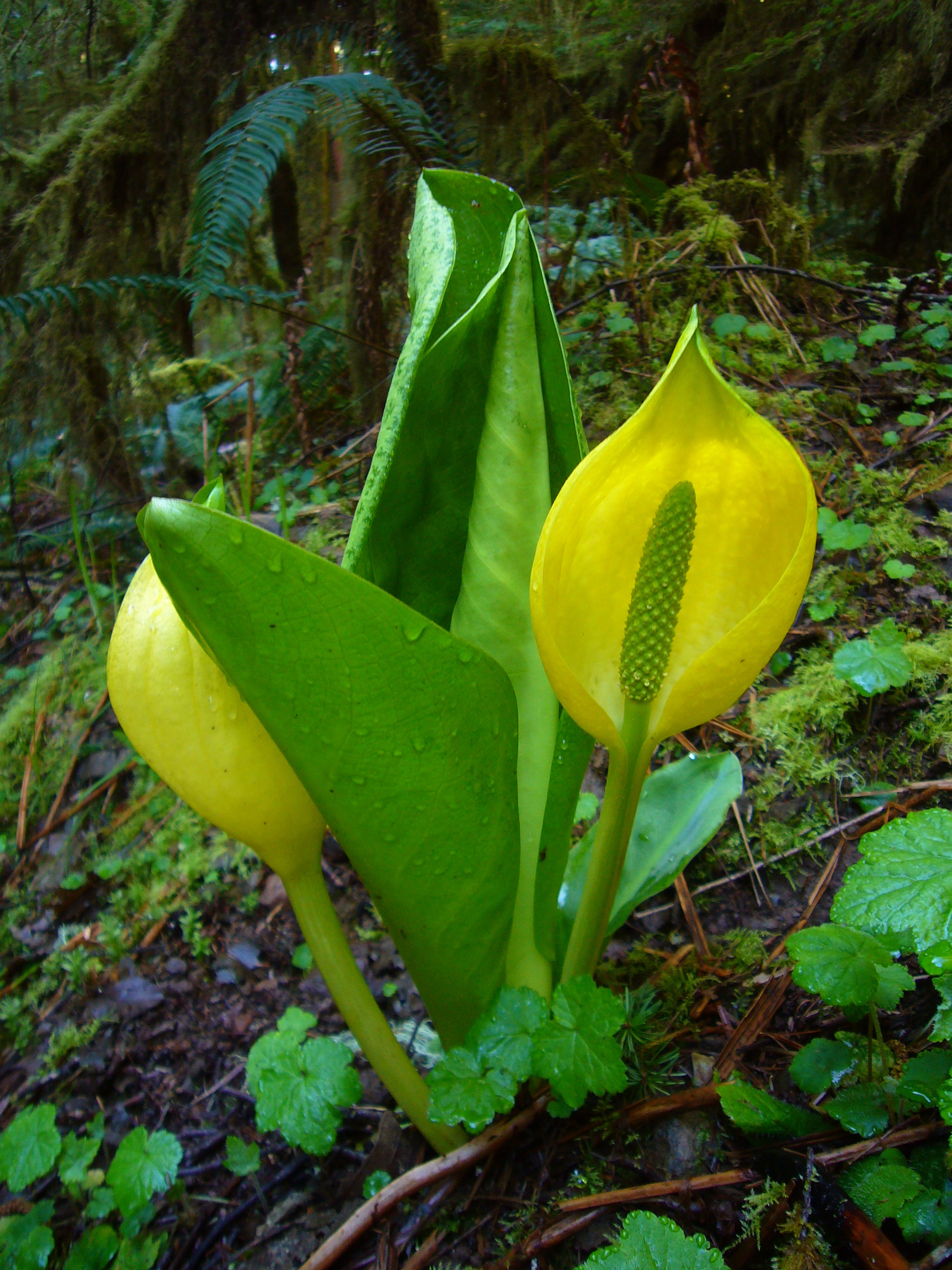

Conservation status
- Least Concern (IUCN 3.1)

Scientific classification
- Kingdom: Plantae
- Clade: Tracheophytes
- Clade: Angiosperms
- Clade: Monocots
- Order: Alismatales
- Family: Araceae
- Genus: Lysichiton
- Species: L. americanus

Binomial name
- Lysichiton americanus Hultén & H.St.John

Synonyms
- Lysichitum americanum (L.) Schott, orth. var.

= Lysichiton americanus =

Species of flowering plant

Lysichiton americanus, also called western skunk cabbage (US), yellow skunk cabbage (UK), American skunk-cabbage (Britain and Ireland) or swamp lantern, is a plant found in swamps and wet woods, along streams and in other wet areas of the Pacific Northwest, where it is one of the few native species in the arum family.

The plant is called skunk cabbage because of the distinctive "skunky" odor that it emits when it blooms. This odor will permeate the area where the plant grows, and can be detected even in old, dried specimens. The distinctive odor attracts its pollinators, scavenging flies and beetles.

Although similarly named and with a similar smell, the plant is easy to distinguish from the eastern skunk cabbage (Symplocarpus foetidus), another species in the arum family found in eastern North America. A cross between it and a closely related species from Japan, also called "skunk cabbage" but less malodorous, is grown as an ornamental plant on the margins of British aquatic gardens.

== Description ==
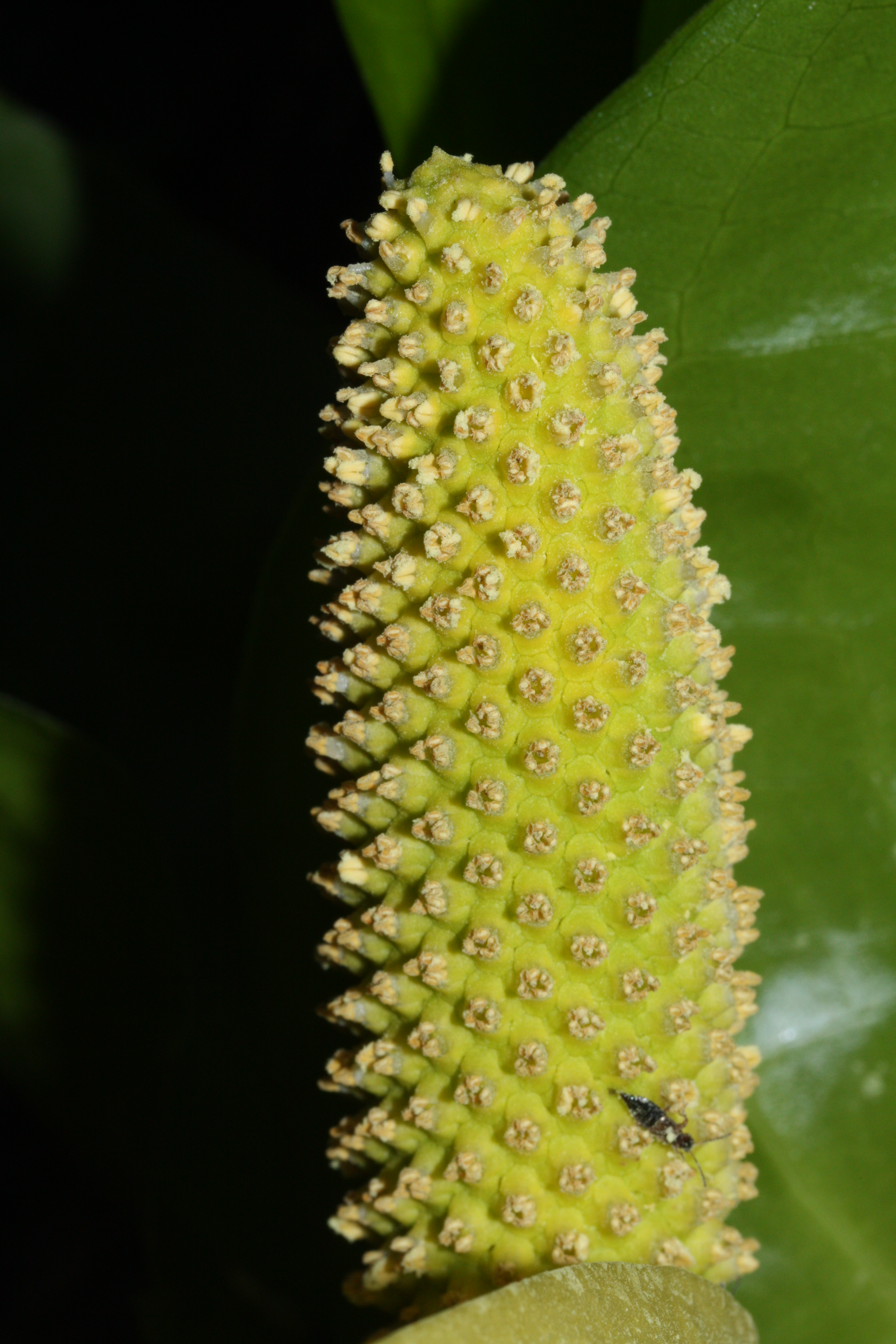
Flower detail

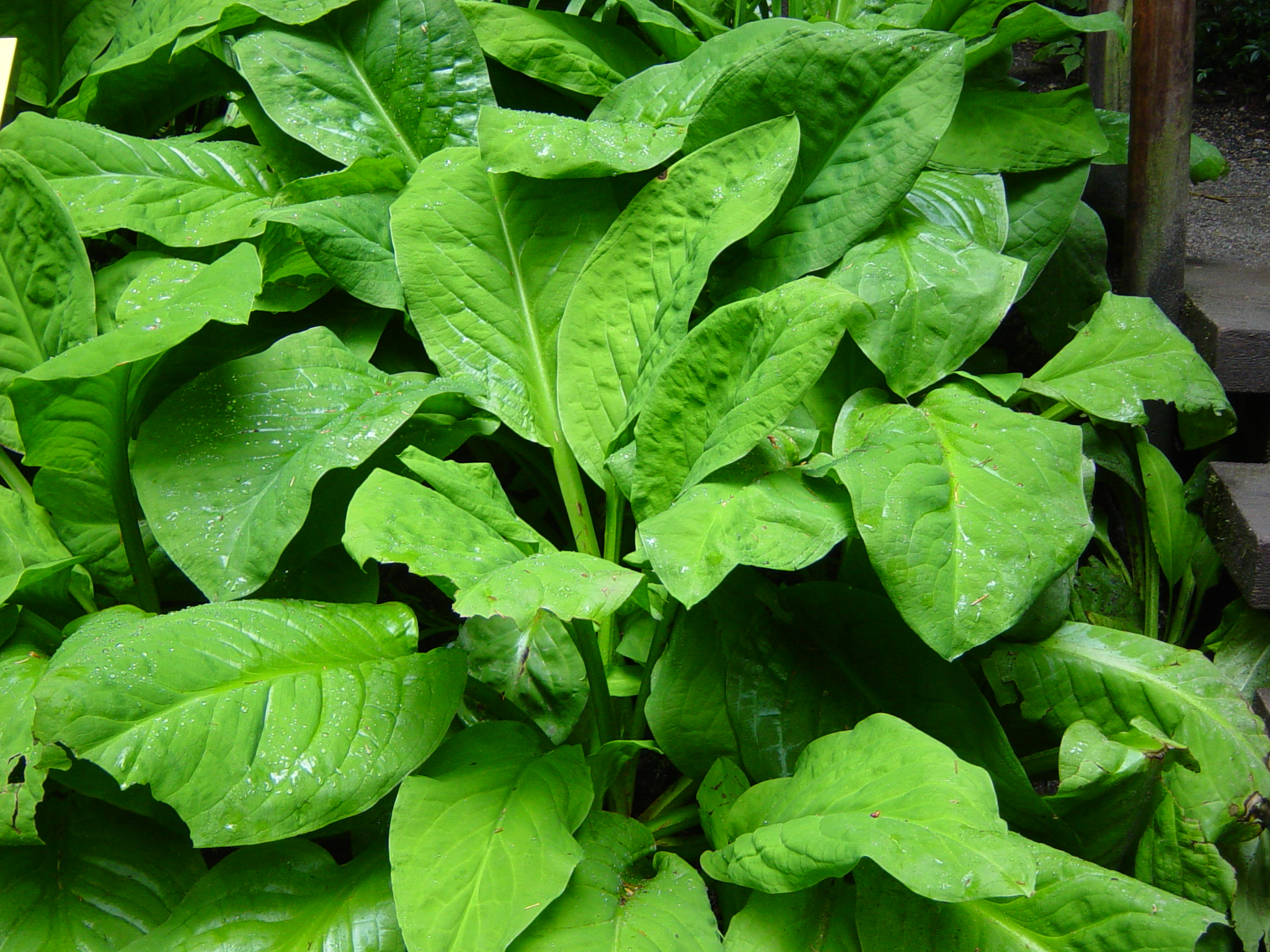
Foliage of L. americanus

The plant grows from rhizomes that measure 30 centimetres (12 inches) or longer, and 2.5 to 5 cm (1 to 2 in) in diameter. The short-stalked leaves are the largest of any native plant in the region, 30–150 cm (12–59 in) long and 10–70 cm (4–27 1/2 in) wide when mature. Its flowers are produced in a spadix contained within a 7–12 cm (3–4 1/2 in) large, bright yellow or yellowish green spathe atop a 30–50 cm (12–20 in) stalk. The flowers are numerous and densely packed. It is among the first flowers to bloom in late winter or early spring (typically March–July). Unlike the genus Symplocarpus (which includes S. foetidus, the eastern skunk cabbage), the flowers of Lysichiton species do not produce heat, although this is widely and incorrectly said to be the case.

== Distribution ==
Lysichiton americanus is found from Kodiak Island and Cook Inlet, Alaska south through British Columbia, Washington, Oregon, and Northern California as far south as Santa Cruz County. Isolated populations are also found in northeastern Washington, Idaho, Montana, and Wyoming.

The plant was introduced into cultivation in the United Kingdom in 1901 and has escaped to become naturalized in marshy areas in Britain and Ireland, for example in Hampshire and Surrey, including Wisley Gardens, and in the north and west of the UK. Once established in an area, it can be very difficult to control. In 2016, it was classified by the European Union as an invasive species. This implies that this species cannot be imported, cultivated, transported, commercialized, planted, or intentionally released into the environment in the whole of the European Union.

== Cultivation ==
It was used as an ornamental garden plant in Britain and Ireland, where it grows well in marshy conditions. As of 2018, the Royal Horticultural Society recommends that it should not be cultivated.

Hybrids with Lysichiton camtschatcensis, called Lysichiton × hortensis, are also cultivated. These have larger spathes than either of the parent species.

== Ecology ==
Flies are drawn by the odour to pollinate the flowers.

While some consider the plant to be a weed, deer may browse the leaves, and its roots are food for American black bears. After emerging from hibernation, bears eat it as a laxative or cathartic.

== Uses ==
The plant was used by indigenous people as medicine for burns and injuries, and in times of famine as an emergency food source, when the leaves were heated and eaten. The leaves have a somewhat spicy or peppery taste.

Although the plant was not part of human diet under normal conditions, its large, waxy leaves were important to food preparation and storage. They were commonly used to line berry baskets and to wrap around whole salmon and other foods when baked under a fire.

The leaves were also used as a medicated bandage to cure sores and swelling. Its sap was used as a treatment for ringworm.

== Toxicity ==
The plant contains calcium oxalate crystals, which result in a prickling sensation on the tongue and throat and can cause intestinal irritation; if consumed in large quantities it can even cause death.

== See also ==
- Calla palustris (bog arum): A similar plant grown as an ornamental herbaceous perennial.
