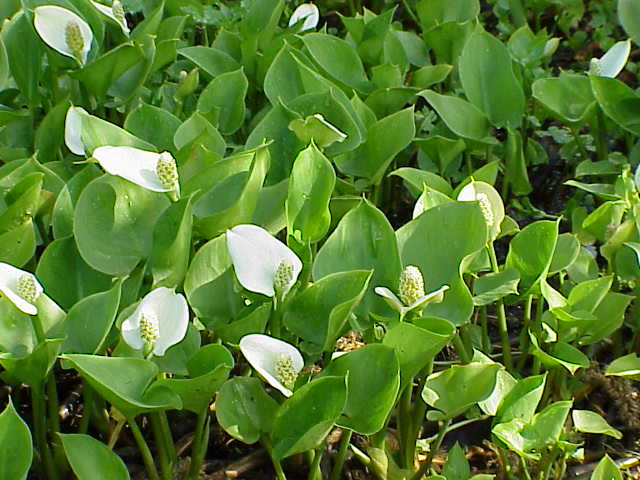

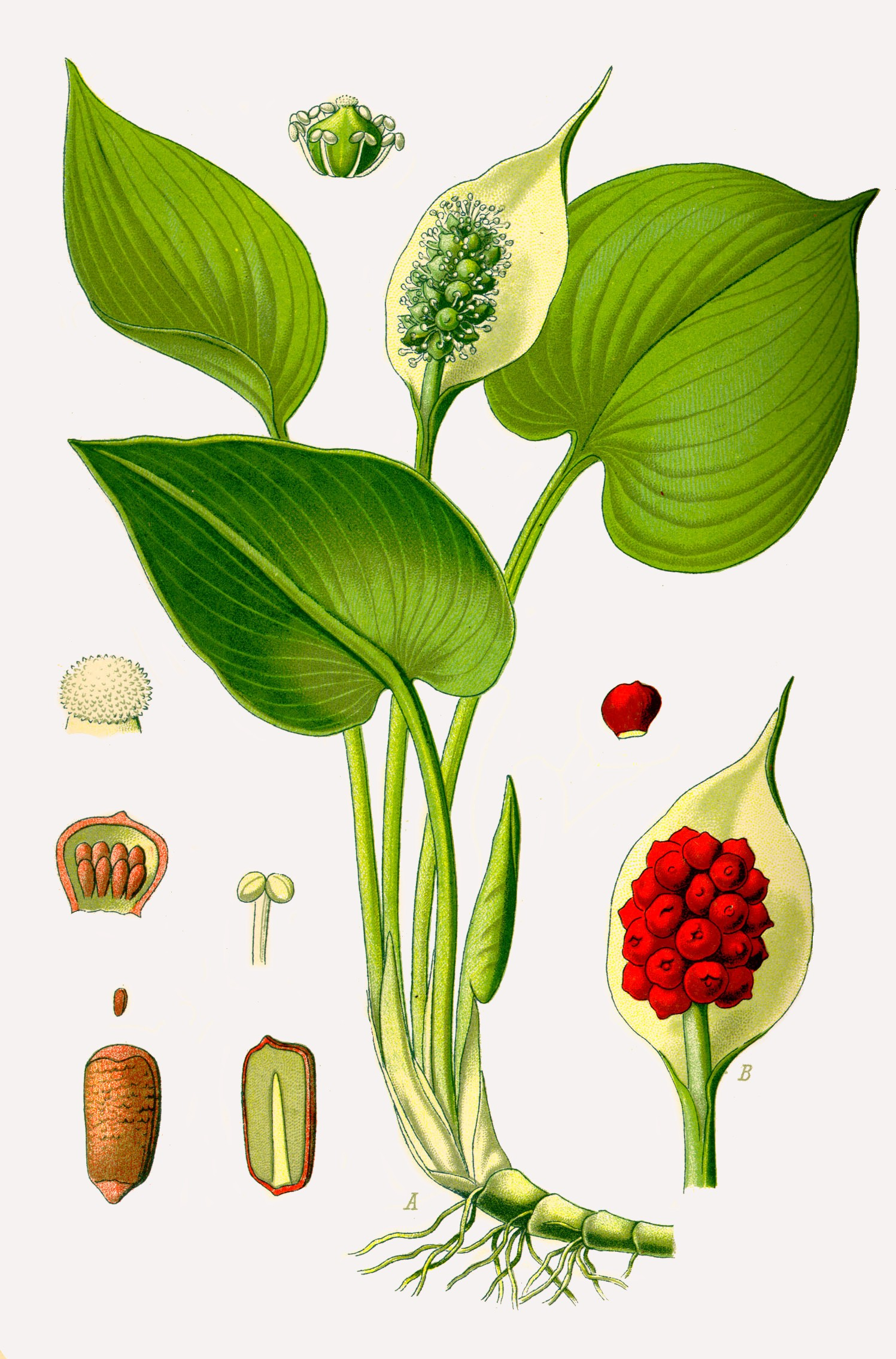
- Flora von Deutschland, Österreich und der Schweiz 1885

Conservation status
- Secure (NatureServe)

- Least Concern (IUCN 3.1)

Scientific classification
- Kingdom: Plantae
- Clade: Embryophytes
- Clade: Tracheophytes
- Clade: Spermatophytes
- Clade: Angiosperms
- Clade: Monocots
- Order: Alismatales
- Family: Araceae
- Subfamily: Aroideae
- Tribe: Calleae; Bartl.
- Genus: Calla; L.
- Species: C. palustris

Binomial name
- Calla palustris L.

Synonyms
- Of the genus: Aroides Heist. ex Fabr.; Callaion Raf.; Callaria Raf.; Provenzalia Adans.; Of the species: List: Calla brevis (Raf.) Á.Löve & D.Löve; Calla cordifolia Stokes; Calla generalis E.H.L.Krause; Calla ovatifolia Gilib.; Callaion bispatha (Raf.) Raf.; Callaion brevis (Raf.) Raf.; Callaion heterophylla (Raf.) Raf.; Callaion palustris (L.) Raf.; Dracunculus paludosus Montandon; Provenzalia bispatha Raf.; Provenzalia brevis Raf.; Provenzalia heterophyla Raf.; Provenzalia palustris (L.) Raf.

= Calla =

Monotypic genus of flowering plant

Calla is a genus of flowering plant in the family Araceae, containing the single species Calla palustris (bog arum, marsh calla, wild calla, squaw claw, and water-arum). It is the only genus in the tribe Calleae of the subfamily Aroideae. Its systematic position has been described as "puzzling", and it has also been placed in its own family Callaceae and its own subfamily Calloideae.

== Description ==
It is a rhizomatous herbaceous perennial plant growing in bogs and ponds. The leaves are rounded to heart-shaped, 6–12 cm (2 1/4–4 3/4 in) long on a 10–20 cm (4–8 in) petiole, and 4–12 cm (1 1/2–4 3/4 in) broad. The greenish-yellow inflorescence is produced on a spadix about 4–6 cm (1 1/2–2 1/4 in) long, enclosed in a white spathe. The fruit is a cluster of red berries, each berry containing several seeds.

The plant is very poisonous when fresh due to its high oxalic acid content, but the rhizome (like that of Caladium, Colocasia, and Arum) is edible after drying, grinding, leaching and boiling.

== Taxonomy ==
The genus Calla and its sole species Calla palustris were first described by Carl Linnaeus in 1753. The genus formerly also included a number of other species, which have now been transferred to the separate genus Zantedeschia. These plants from tropical Africa, however, are still often termed "calla lilies" but should not be confused with C. palustris.

The genus Calla has been regarded as a "puzzling case" in relation to its systematic position. Its pollen is unusual within the family Araceae. The pollen grains are small, ornamented differently, and with a differently constructed exine. Treatments based on anatomy and morphology have tended to separate Calla from other aroids. It has been placed in its own family, Callaceae, or in its own subfamily Calloideae within the Araceae. (In the Engler system, Calloideae had included the genera now placed in Orontioideae.) Molecular phylogenetic studies on the other hand place Calla within the subfamily Aroideae, where it may be given its own tribe Calleae.

== Distribution ==
It is native to cool temperate regions of the Northern Hemisphere, in central, eastern and northern Europe (France and Norway eastward, but not Britain), northern Asia and northern North America (Alaska, Canada, and northeastern contiguous United States).
