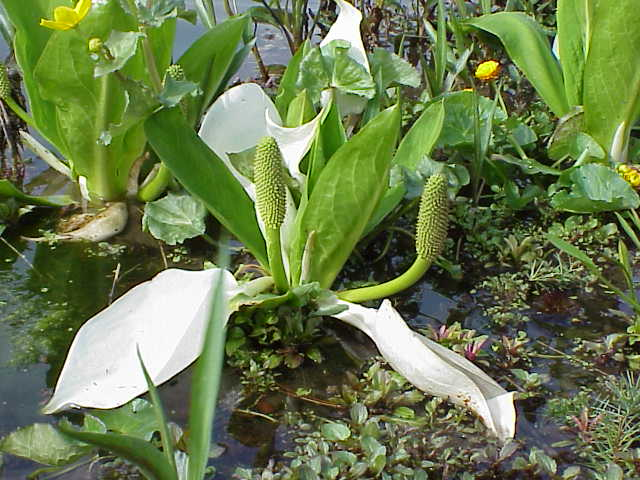
- Lysichiton camtschatcensis

Scientific classification
- Kingdom: Plantae
- Clade: Embryophytes
- Clade: Tracheophytes
- Clade: Spermatophytes
- Clade: Angiosperms
- Clade: Monocots
- Order: Alismatales
- Family: Araceae
- Subfamily: Orontioideae
- Genus: Lysichiton; Schott

Species
- Lysichiton americanus Lysichiton camtschatcensis

Synonyms
- Arctiodracon A.Gray

= Lysichiton =

Genus of flowering plants

Lysichiton is a genus in the family Araceae. These plants are known commonly as skunk cabbage or less often as swamp lantern. The spelling Lysichitum is also found. The genus has two species, one found in north-east Asia (Japan and Russian Far East), the other in north-west America (Aleutians to Santa Cruz County in California).

== Description ==
Lysichiton has flowers which are typical of those of the family to which it belongs (the arum family or Araceae). The individual flowers are small and are tightly packed on a fleshy stem called a spadix which is surrounded by a white or yellow but otherwise leaf-like bract called a spathe. The spathe is hooded or boat-shaped at the top. Lysichiton has flowers with both male and female parts present (bisexual), unlike many other aroids. After fertilization, the green fruits become embedded in the spadix; each fruit usually has two seeds but may have up to four. Several large leaves appear either just before flowering or soon afterwards; each has a short stalk (petiole). Plants die down to a vertical rhizome in winter.

== Taxonomy ==
The genus Lysichiton was described by Heinrich Schott in 1857. The name is derived from two Greek words: λύσις (lysis, dissolve) and χιτῶν (chiton, armour), referring to the armour-like spathe enclosing the inflorescence that withers soon after flowering. Schott used two variants of this name in his original publication: one with a Latinized ending, Lysichitum, and the other with a Greek ending, Lysichiton. In two later publications he used only the second variant. Only one species was assigned to the genus, Lysichiton camtschatcensis. In a paper published in 1932, Eric Hultén and Harold St. John separated American plants into a second species. They decided that Schott's Lysichitum was correct under the rules of botanical nomenclature; accordingly older sources use this spelling as the generic name for both species. (Note: An additional complication is that Lysichitum should be followed by a specific epithet in the neuter gender, giving Lysichitum americanum and Lysichitum camtschatcense, whereas Lysichiton requires masculine gender, giving Lysichiton americanus and Lysichiton camtschatcensis. Various combinations of generic name and specific epithet are found in the literature.) In 1956 they revised their view and decided that the correct generic name was the one which was adopted latest by Schott, namely Lysichiton. This is the spelling now used.

Along with other members of the subfamily Orontioideae, Lysichiton has been placed in a group of "proto-aroids", which appear to have evolved before the characteristic features of most aroids emerged. Thus the genus has flowers which retain small petals and which are bisexual, whereas more "advanced" aroids have unisexual flowers without petals.

=== Species ===
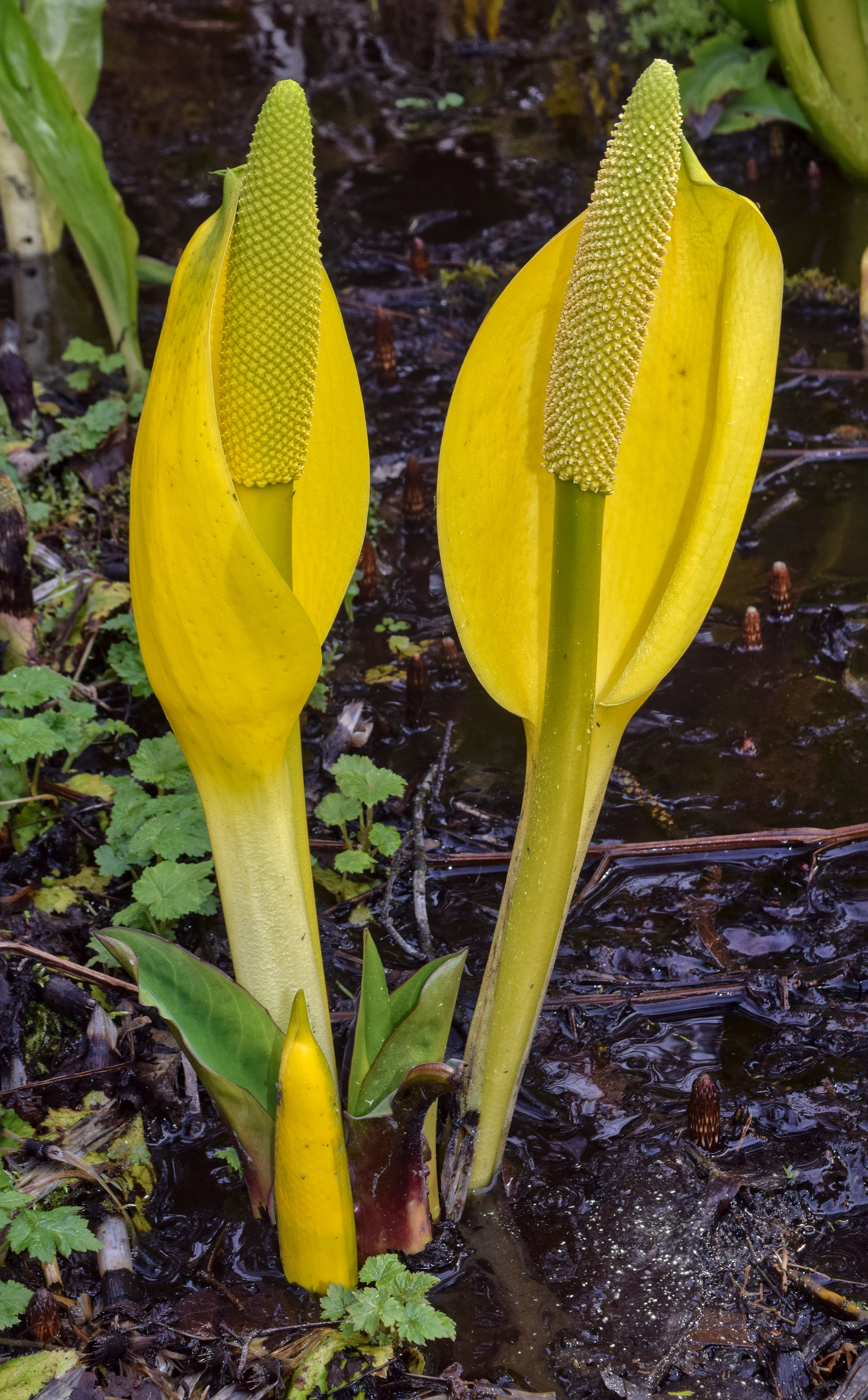
L. americanus

This genus includes two species and the hybrid between them which occurred in cultivation:

- Lysichiton americanus Hultén & H.St.John – Western skunk cabbage, Western North America
- Lysichiton camtschatcensis (L.) Schott – Asian skunk cabbage, Northeastern Asia
- Lysichiton × hortensis J.D.Arm. & B.W.Phillips – Hybrid swamp lantern

These two species were originally considered conspecific, under the earlier-described name L. camtschatcensis. The most obvious difference between them lies in the spathe, which is yellow with a green-suffused apex in L. americanus and white with at most a small amount of green at the apex in L. camtscatcensis. There are also differences in the leaves. At flowering time these are almost undeveloped in L. camtschatcensis, but about half grown in L. americanus. Lysichiton americanus has broader leaves, rounded at the base, with glossy upper surfaces, whereas L. camtschatcensis has less broad leaves, more pointed at the base, with dull, somewhat grey-green (glaucous) upper surfaces.

== Uses ==
Both species, but particularly L. americanus, have been used as ornamental garden plants. L. americanus was introduced into cultivation in the United Kingdom in 1901 and has escaped to become naturalized in marshy areas in Britain and Ireland. The hybrid between the two species occurred in cultivation, and is larger than either parent, with a less unpleasant scent.

Lysichiton americanus was used by indigenous people in various ways. See Lysichiton americanus: Other uses.
