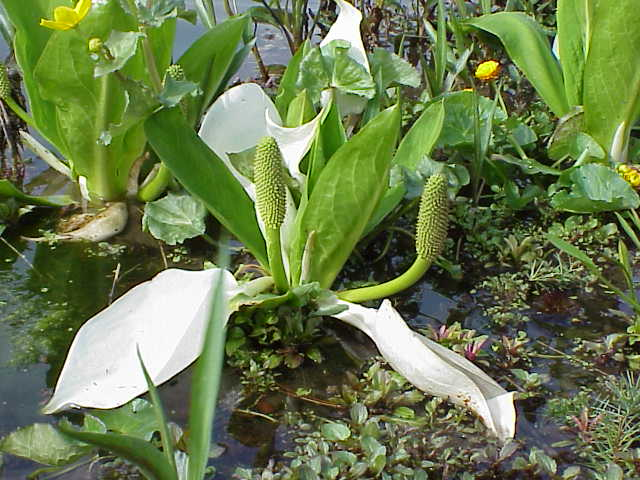
- Lysichiton camtschatcensis

Scientific classification
- Kingdom: Plantae
- Clade: Tracheophytes
- Clade: Angiosperms
- Clade: Monocots
- Order: Alismatales
- Family: Araceae
- Subfamily: Orontioideae; Mayo, Bogner, & Boyce

Genera
- Lysichiton; Orontium; Symplocarpus

= Orontioideae =

Orontioideae Temporal range: Late Cretaceous - Recent

Subfamily of flowering plants

Orontioideae is a subfamily of flowering plants in the family Araceae. The subfamily consists of three genera namely, Lysichiton (one to two species of skunk cabbage from North America and Asia), Orontium (golden club, one living species from eastern North America and two extinct species known from fossils), and Symplocarpus (several species of skunk cabbage from North America and Asia). Characteristics of Orontioideae include medium-sized pollen grains and subterranean stems. Species in the subfamily have a base chromosome number of X=13.
