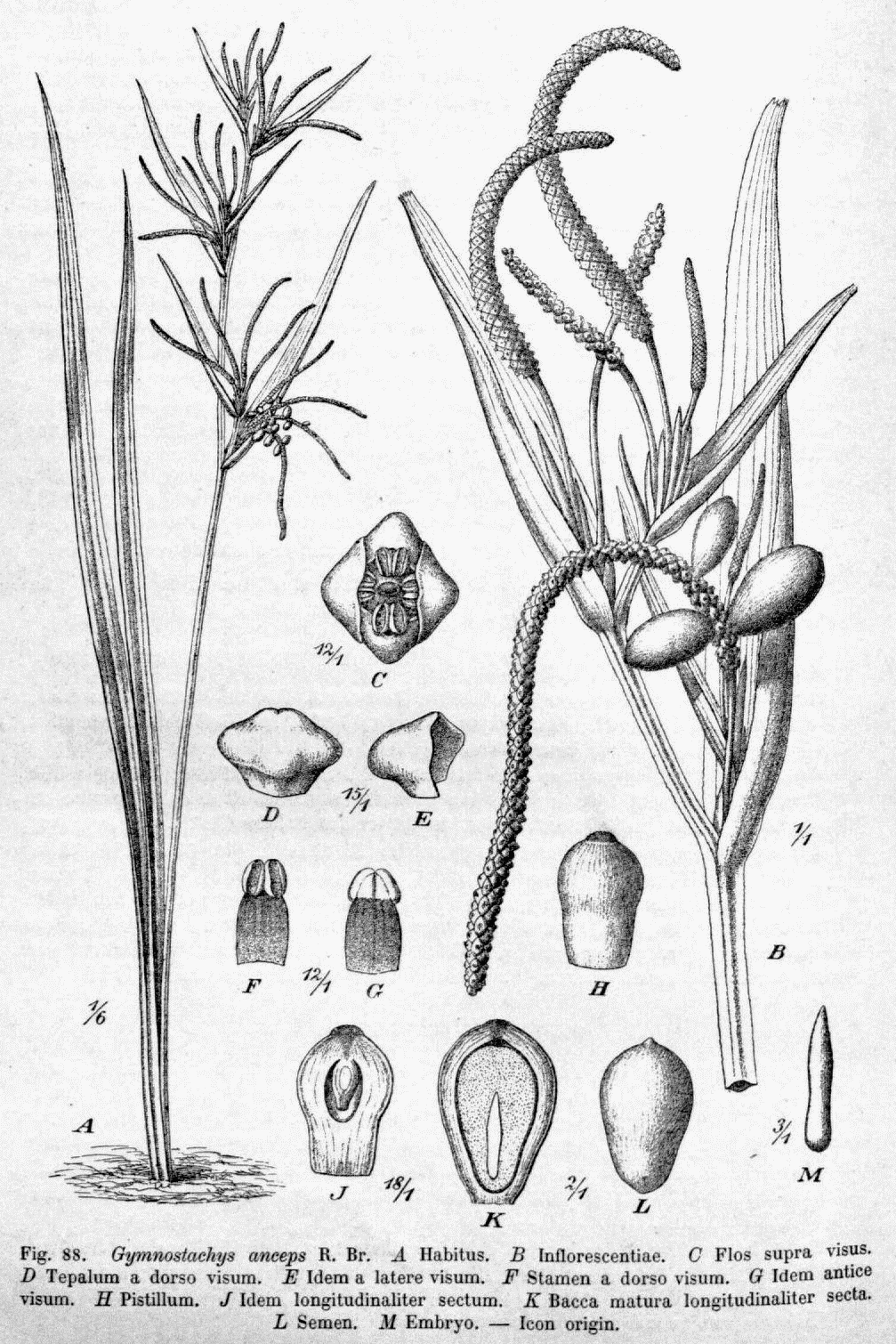

Conservation status
- Least Concern (NCA)

Scientific classification
- Kingdom: Plantae
- Clade: Embryophytes
- Clade: Tracheophytes
- Clade: Spermatophytes
- Clade: Angiosperms
- Clade: Monocots
- Order: Alismatales
- Family: Araceae
- Subfamily: Gymnostachydoideae; Bogner & Nicolson
- Genus: Gymnostachys; R.Br.
- Species: G. anceps

Binomial name
- Gymnostachys anceps R.Br.

Synonyms
- Pothos anceps (R.Br.) Spreng. ex Schult. & Schult.f.; Gymnostachys gigantea Domin

= Gymnostachys =

Genus of flowering plants

Gymnostachys is a monotypic genus (i.e. a genus which contains only one species) in the arum plant family Araceae. The sole described species is Gymnostachys anceps, commonly known as settler's flax, settler's twine or boorgay. It is native to coastal and sub-coastal parts of eastern Australia, from near Ulladulla, New South Wales, to around Rossville at the base of Cape York Peninsula.

Gymnostachys is placed in the subfamily Gymnostachydoideae due to its unique characteristics that include an unusually structured flowering shoot and linear leaves with parallel venation.

== Gallery ==
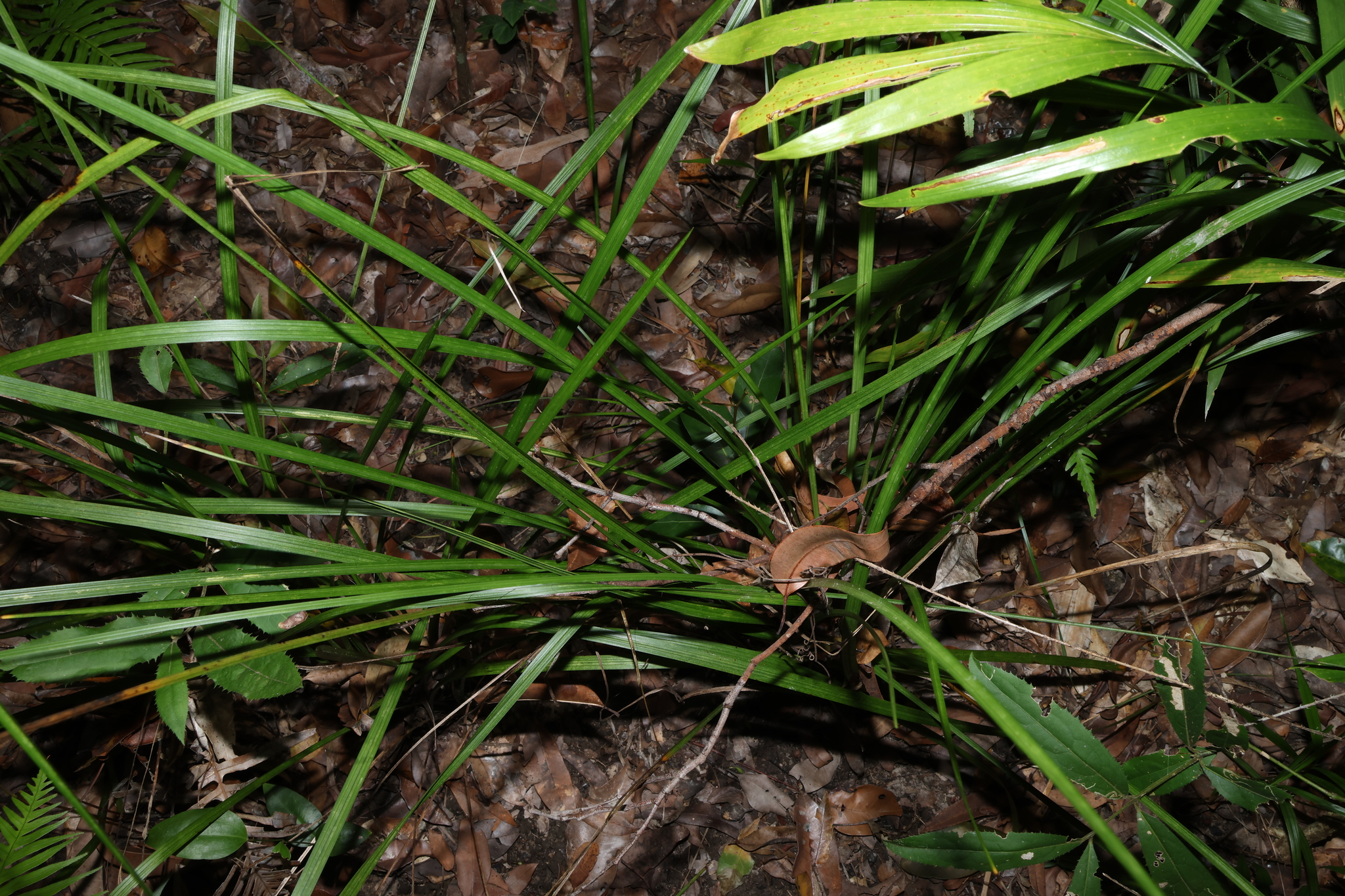
Habit

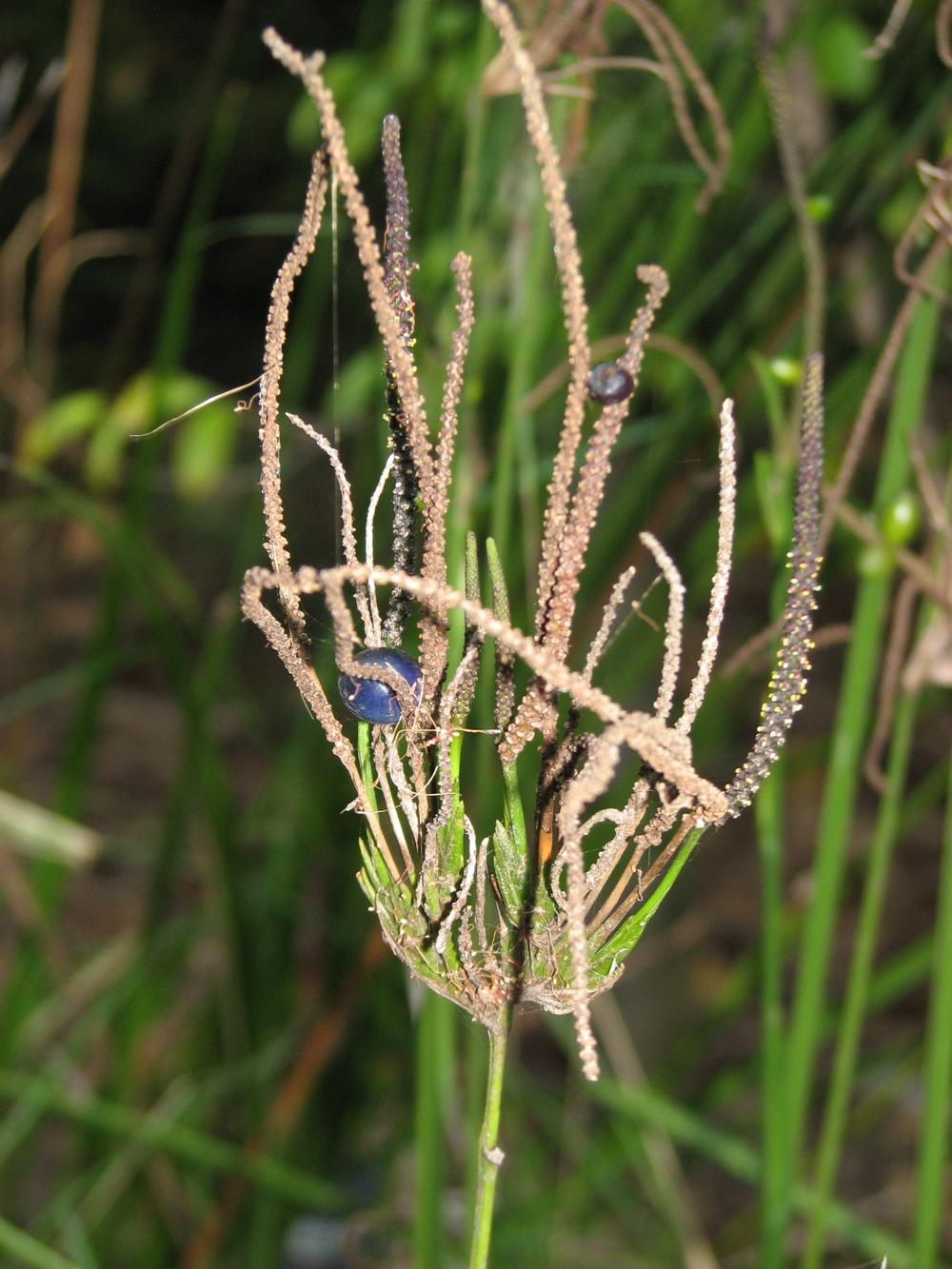
Flowers

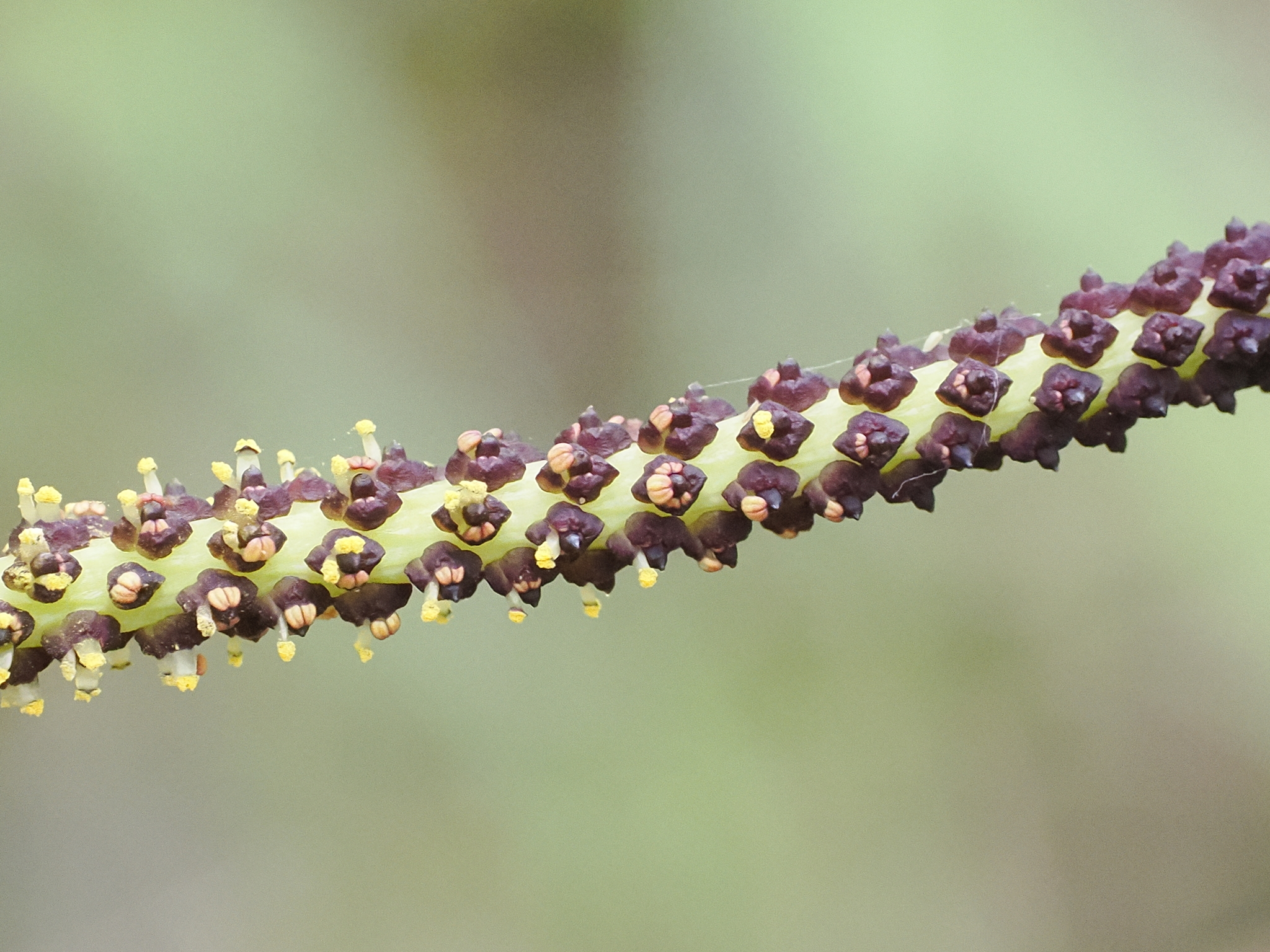
Flower detail

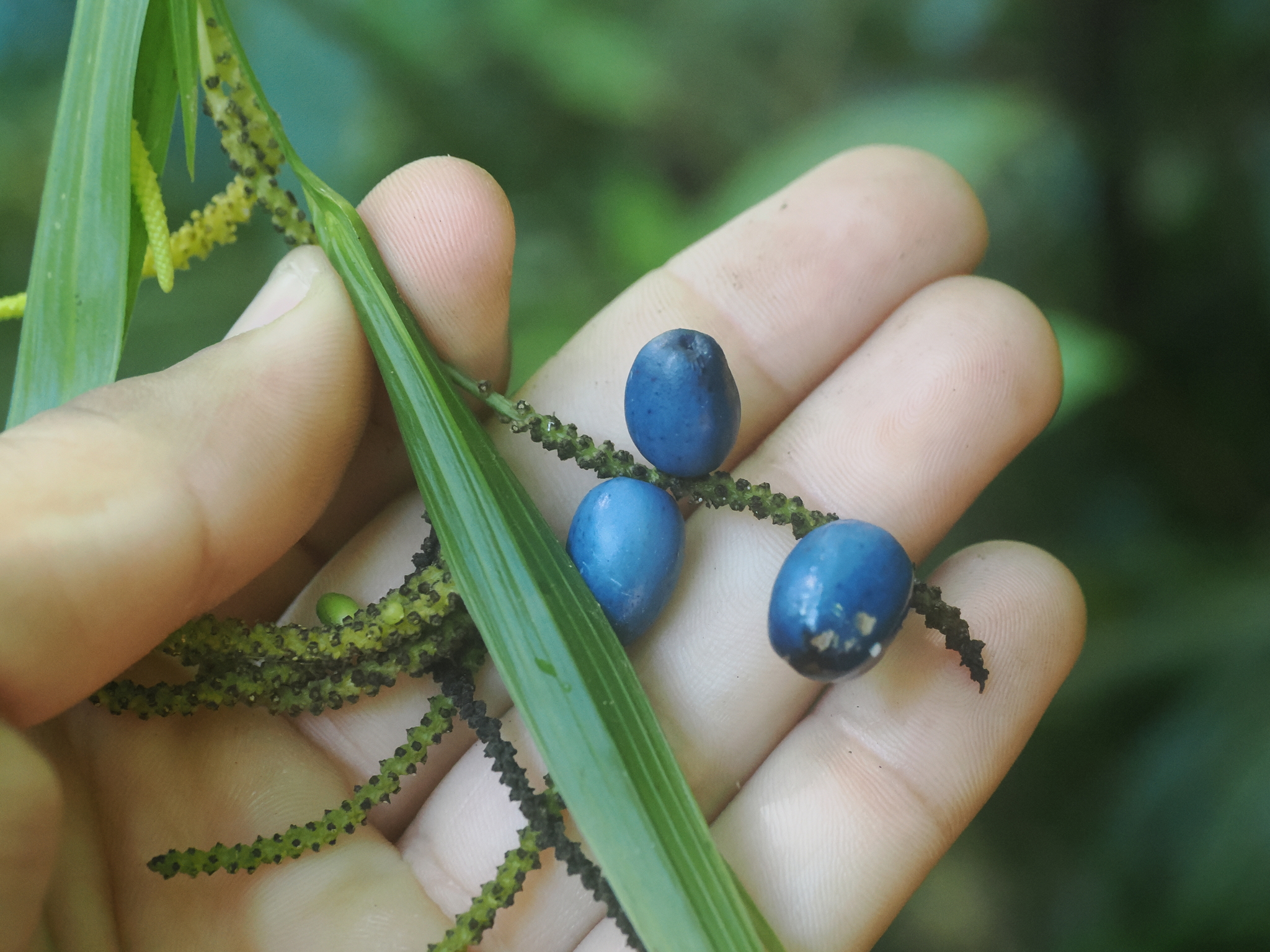
Fruit
