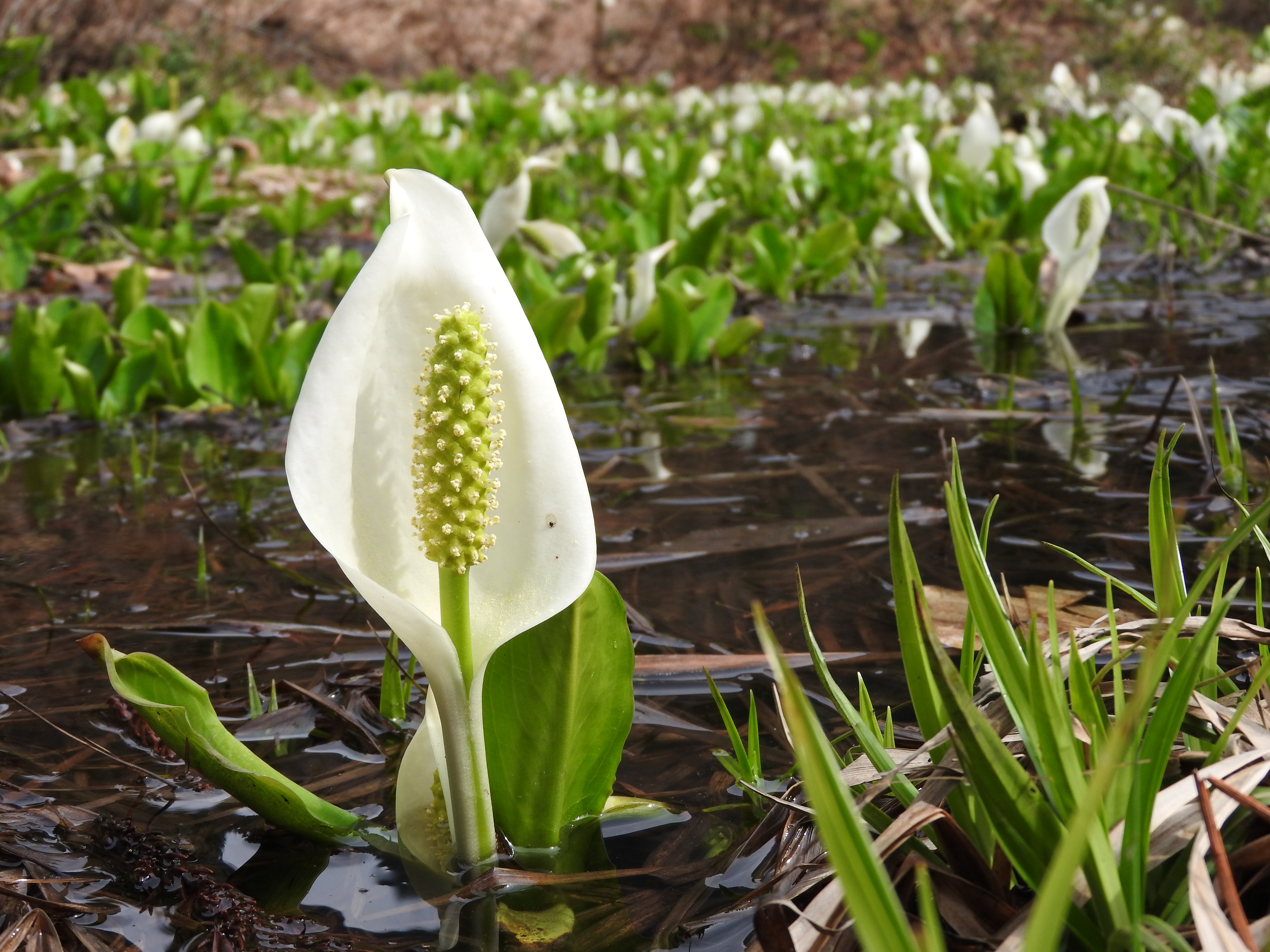
- Lysichiton camtschatcensis in Hakusan, Japan

Scientific classification
- Kingdom: Plantae
- Clade: Tracheophytes
- Clade: Angiosperms
- Clade: Monocots
- Order: Alismatales
- Family: Araceae
- Genus: Lysichiton
- Species: L. camtschatcensis

Binomial name
- Lysichiton camtschatcensis (L.) Schott

Synonyms
- Lysichitum camtschatcense (L.) Schott, orth. var.

= Lysichiton camtschatcensis =

Asian skunk cabbage

Species of flowering plant

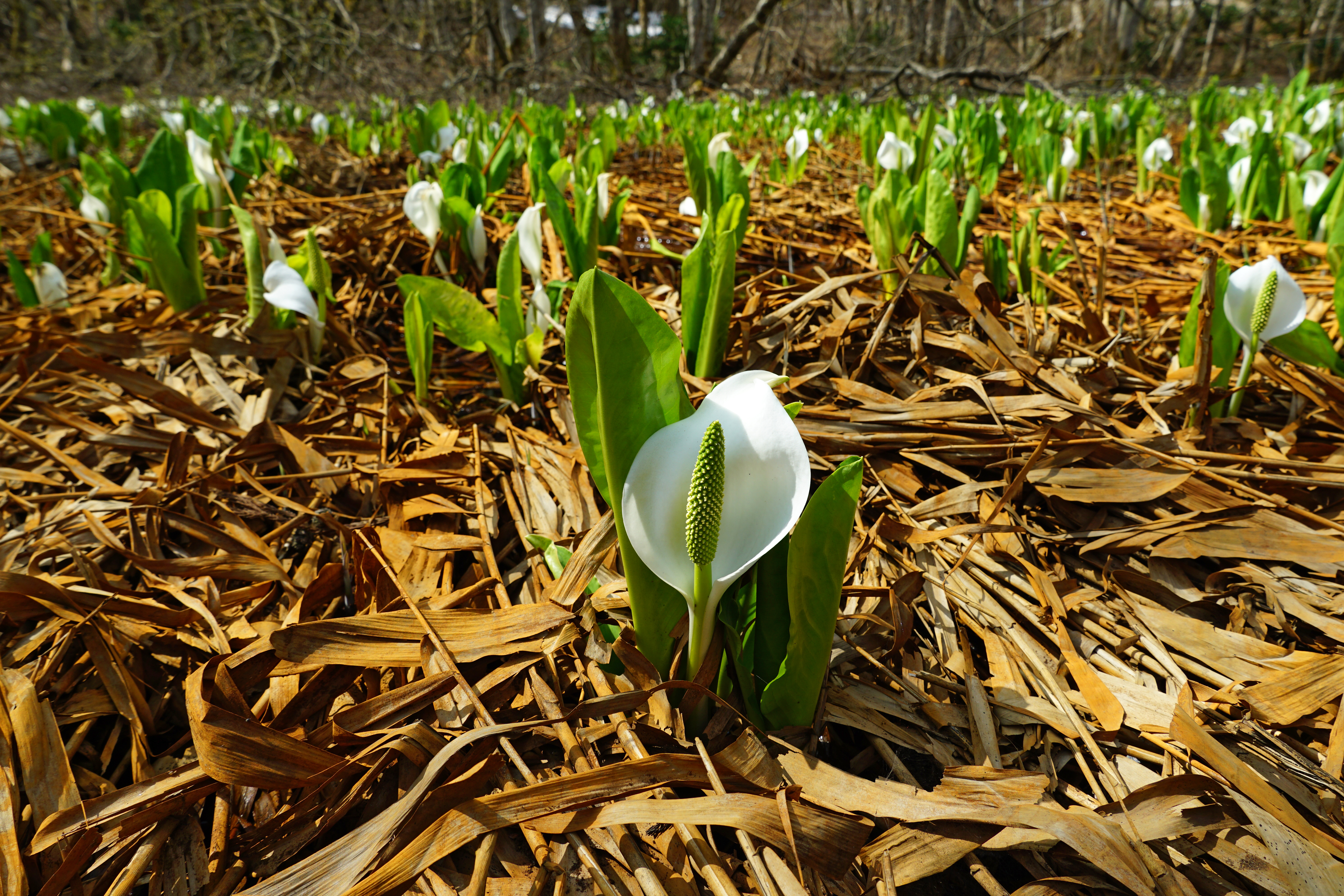
Lysichiton camtschatcensis in Yamagata, Japan

Lysichiton camtschatcensis, common name Asian skunk cabbage, white skunk cabbage, Far Eastern swamp lantern or Japanese swamp lantern, is a plant found in swamps and wet woods, along streams and in other wet areas of the Kamchatka Peninsula, the Kuril Islands, Sakhalin and northern Japan. The common name "skunk cabbage" is used for the genus Lysichiton, which includes L. americanus, the western skunk cabbage, noted for its unpleasant smell. The Asian skunk cabbage is more variable: plants have been reported in different cases to smell disgusting, not at all, and sweet. In Japanese it is known as mizubashō (lit. "water-banana") from a supposed similarity to the Japanese banana, a name with poetic rather than malodorous associations. It is not closely related to the true cabbage.

== Description ==
It is a robust herbaceous perennial growing to 75 cm (30 in) tall and wide, with strongly veined, glossy leaves 50–100 cm (20–40 in) long. In early spring each plant produces a fragrant, pointed white spathe up to 40 cm (16 in) long, surrounding a green spadix.

== Cultivation ==
Like its close relative, L. americanus, it is used as a marginal aquatic plant in gardens in Great Britain and Ireland. It has gained the Royal Horticultural Society's Award of Garden Merit.

Hybrids between L. camschatcensis and L. americanus, called Lysichiton × hortensis, are also cultivated. These have larger spathes than either of the parents.

== See also ==
- Western skunk cabbage (Lysichiton americanus ): A related plant (in the same genus) from North America, which is known for producing a foul smell
- Eastern skunk cabbage (Symplocarpus foetidus), of the same subfamily, from North America, also known for its foul smell, and often confused with the western skunk cabbage
