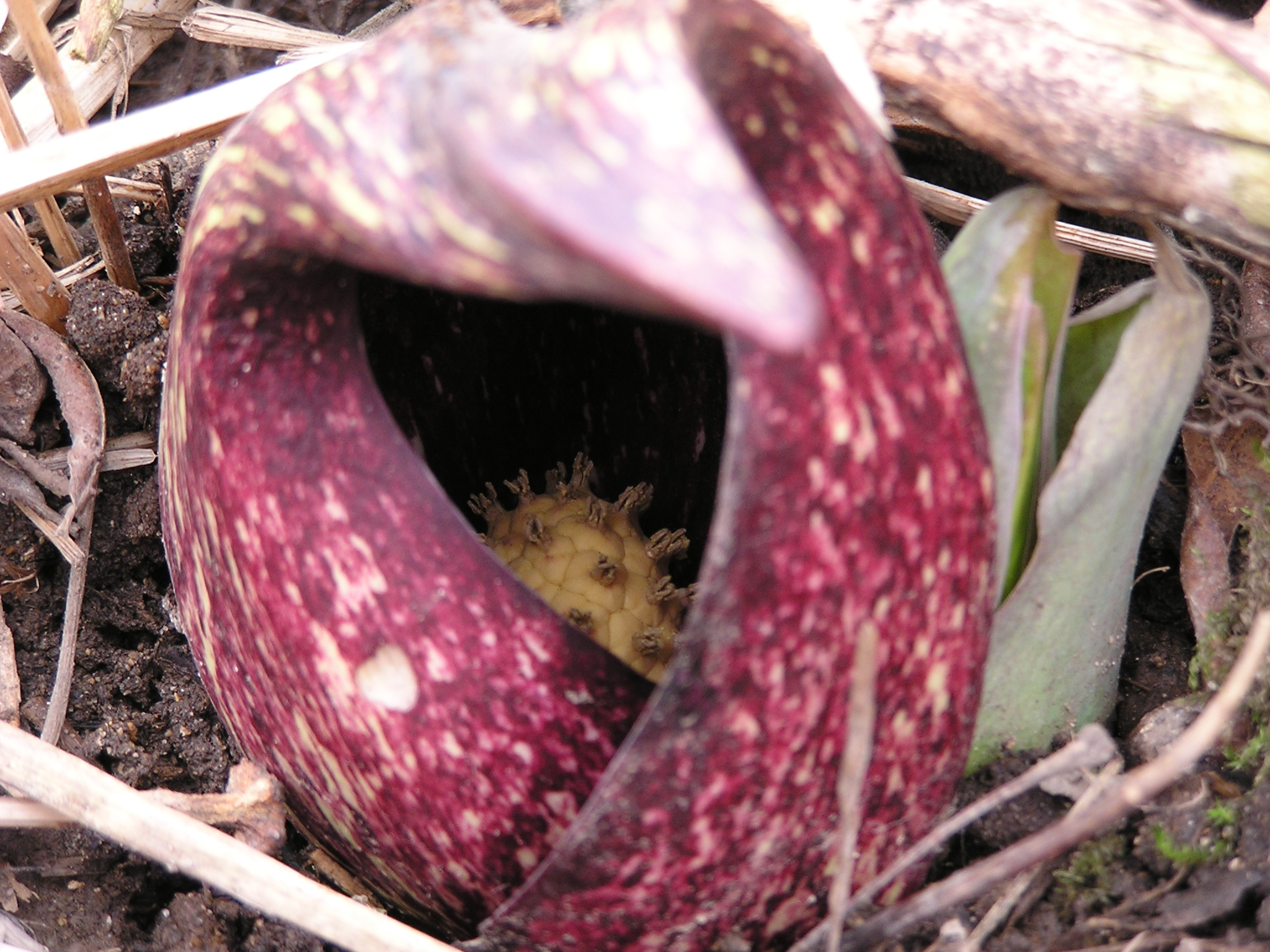
- Symplocarpus foetidus

Scientific classification
- Kingdom: Plantae
- Clade: Tracheophytes
- Clade: Angiosperms
- Clade: Monocots
- Order: Alismatales
- Family: Araceae
- Subfamily: Orontioideae
- Genus: Symplocarpus (L.) Salisb. ex W.P.C.Barton

Synonyms
- Spathyema Raf.; Ictodes Bigelow

= Symplocarpus =

Genus of flowering plants

Symplocarpus is a genus of flowering plants in the family Araceae, native to United States, Canada and eastern Asia. The genus is characterized by having large leaves and deep root systems with contractile roots used for changing the plant's level with the ground. Symplocarpus species grow from a rhizome and their leaves release a foul odor when crushed.

The best known species is Symplocarpus foetidus, commonly called "skunk cabbage".

== Species ==
1. Symplocarpus egorovii N.S.Pavlova & V.A.Nechaev - Primorye region of Russia
2. Symplocarpus foetidus (L.) Salisb. ex W.P.C.Barton - southeastern Canada and northeastern United States, from Tennessee to Minnesota and Nova Scotia
3. Symplocarpus nabekuraensis Otsuka & K.Inoue - Mt. Nabekura in west-central Honshu in Japan
4. Symplocarpus nipponicus Makino - Korea, northern Japan, northeastern China
5. Symplocarpus renifolius Schott ex Tzvelev - Russian Far East, Korea, northern Japan, northeastern China
