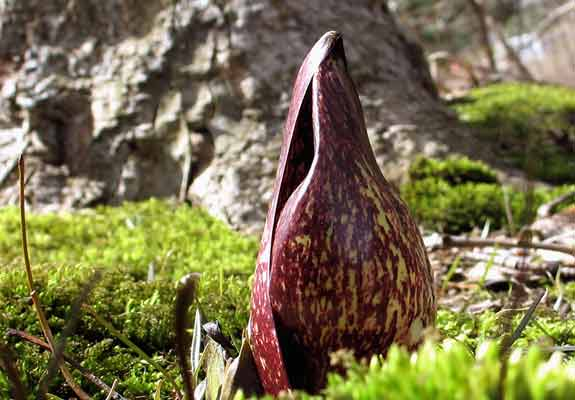
- Skunk cabbage in early spring

Conservation status
- Least Concern (IUCN 3.1)

- Secure (NatureServe)

Scientific classification
- Kingdom: Plantae
- Clade: Tracheophytes
- Clade: Angiosperms
- Clade: Monocots
- Order: Alismatales
- Family: Araceae
- Genus: Symplocarpus
- Species: S. foetidus

Binomial name
- Symplocarpus foetidus (L.) Salisb. ex W.P.C.Barton

Synonyms
- Dracontium foetidum L.; Spathyema foetida (L.)Raf.; Pothos foetidus (L.) Aiton; Ictodes foetidus (L.) Bigelow; Pothos putorii Barton; Spathyema angusta Raf.; Spathyema lanceolata Raf.; Spathyema latifolia Raf.; Symplocarpus foetidus f. variegatus Otsuka

= Symplocarpus foetidus =

Eastern skunk cabbage

Species of flowering plant

Symplocarpus foetidus, commonly known as skunk cabbage or eastern skunk cabbage (also swamp cabbage, clumpfoot cabbage, or meadow cabbage, foetid pothos or polecat weed), is a low-growing plant that grows in wetlands and moist hill slopes of eastern North America. Bruised leaves present an odor reminiscent of skunk.

Symplocarpus combines the Greek word symploce, meaning "connection" and carpos, meaning "fruit", to indicate that the plant has a compound fruit.

Linnaeus gave the plant its species name of foetidus, Latin for "bad-smelling". The plant produces a strong odor, which is repulsive to many but sometimes described as smelling like "fresh cabbage with a slight suggestion of mustard". The odor increases in intensity over time, as the plant matures, likely due to increased ripeness in the plant's stamens.

== Description ==
The plant grows from a thick rhizome, typically measuring 30 cm (0.98 ft). It has leaves that are large, each 40–55 cm (16–22 in) long and 30–40 cm (12–16 in) wide. Blooming early in the spring, just its blossoms can be seen above the mud.

The plant is generally pulled back into the earth as it develops every year. The roots permanently wrinkle up due to their contractile activity. Particularly towards the top or older end of older roots, these marks or wrinkles have an odd ring-like appearance. As time elapses the entire stem is buried below ground and the plant becomes practically impossible to dig up.

The spathe, which is 10–15 cm (3.9–5.9 in) tall and comes in a variety of colours, contains a spadix that is 5–10 cm (2.0–3.9 in) long in which the flowers reside. While older spathes develop a darker general color with purple smears, younger spathes have a yellowish-green color. Due to thermogenic properties, spathes can melt the surrounding ice in a circle around the spathe. The spathes are hood-like or shell-like in shape. Their mottling closely mimics the fluttering lights and hues frequently observed on underbrush as the sun passes through the leaves of the trees above. On the forest floor, this usually makes it difficult to observe them.

Eastern skunk cabbage flowers have both male and female reproductive organs, making them perfect. Dichogamy, or the division of gender expression into two temporal periods, is a common feature of blooming plants and serves to avoid self-fertilization. Because the flowers are protogynous, the pistils, which are the female reproductive components, reach sexual maturity before the male parts do (stamens). The flowers are inconspicuously crowded on the spadix. The spathes act as the conspicuous portion of the plant. The inflorescence differs in size and the amount of flowers it contains. Due mostly to the crowding effect, the flowers do not show three (or its multiple) floral parts, as should be expected for monocots, but four perianth parts. These look almost cuboidal in shape and overlap each other to make a box-like arrangement. In opposition to the components of the perianth are the stamens. The two-celled anthers are extrorse and move rather flexibly. The pistil's overall structural shape is distinctive: the style is cuboidal, the ovary is one cell, and the stigma has three lobes.

The leafage consists of two whitish sheathing leaves, which have parallel veins characteristic of monocots. The true leaves are rolled within the hard-coiled center. When the tips have pierced the encasing sheath-like leaves, they are typically tinted purplish like the plant's spathe. The first and even second leaves' tips may have this hue on the exterior. These inner, or true, leaves appear to diverge from monocotyledonous plants and lean more toward the dicotyledonous plants' netted veining. The unfolding of the first three leaves reveals a progressive shift toward the later leaves' netted veining. The veining is palmately netted in every instance. The leaves have fairly big air spaces and loosely packed cellular structures under a microscope. There are several rhaphides present in the leaf's enormous bundle masses. There are a number of other crystal forms, some of which are cuboidal in shape or even spherical.

Symplocarpus foetidus reproduce by hard, pea-sized seeds which, when fully grown, drop onto the slimy substrate after developing inside the spadix. Birds, small animals, and floods can then spread the seeds.

== Taxonomy ==
Symplocarpus foetidus was first described as Dracontium foetidum by the Swedish botanist Carl Linnaeus in Species Plantarum in 1753. The British botanist Richard Anthony Salisbury placed Dracontium foetidum L. in genus Symplocarpus in 1812. However, the name Symplocarpus foetidus (L.) Salisb. was invalidly described by Salisbury. Five years later, the American botanist William P. C. Barton provided a valid description for Symplocarpus foetidus (L.) Salisb. ex W.P.C.Barton.

== Distribution and habitat ==
The native region of the eastern skunk cabbage is eastern North America. Its geographic range includes eastern Canada, the northeastern United States, and the states of Tennessee and North Carolina in the southeast and Minnesota in the west. In Canada, the plant's distribution ranges from western Nova Scotia to southeastern Manitoba. In Tennessee, it is protected as an endangered species. Its habitats include moist regions including marshes, wet forests, and stream banks. Like others in the arum family, the eastern skunk cabbage grows best in areas with great moisture.

== Ecology ==
Eastern skunk cabbage belongs to a select group of thermogenic plants for its capacity to create temperatures of up to 15–35 °C (27–63°F) above air temperature through cyanide-resistant cellular respiration (via alternative oxidase) in order to melt its way through frozen ground. One mechanism behind maintaining heat around the plant is the thermogenic oscillation of the spadix: independent of light, a precise thermal regulator is produced by an oscillatory temperature-sensing model in the spadix under dynamic external temperature variation. An equilibrium between heat production and loss, due to heat radiation, evaporation, conduction and convection, is maintained in the spadix. Additionally, the airflow around the spathe effectively maintains heat generated by the spadix.

Eastern skunk cabbage blooms while there is snow and ice on the ground, yet early insects that also emerge at this time effectively pollinate it. According to certain research, the heat the plant generates may aid in dispersing its odour in the atmosphere in addition to enabling the plant to flourish in cold environments.

Skunk cabbage plants generate skunk-like floral odours that contain dimethyl disulfide, aliphatic hydrocarbons, carboxylic acids, and esters, whereas only female plants produce aromatic hydrocarbons and indole chemicals. The fact that the spathe is warmer than the surrounding air may induce carrion-feeding insects to enter it more than once, promoting pollination.

Calliphora vomitoria and other blowflies are common pollinators of skunk cabbage. Curiously, spiders' webs were frequently noticed at the entrance to the spathes. The flower's carrion-like odor attracts the flies, which become tangled in the spider's web and become food for the spider.

== Uses ==
The skunk cabbage has been used in traditional medicine. Numerous Native American cultures employed the eastern skunk cabbage substantially as a medicinal herb, spice, and mystical talisman. The plant was used as an antispasmodic and expectorant. In particular, the Winnebago and Dakota tribes utilized it to encourage phlegm evacuation in asthma patients. Different cultures also utilized it as a talisman and seasoning. It was employed as the medicine "dracontium" in pharmaceutical goods from 1820 until 1882 for respiratory conditions, neurological disorders, rheumatism, and dropsy.

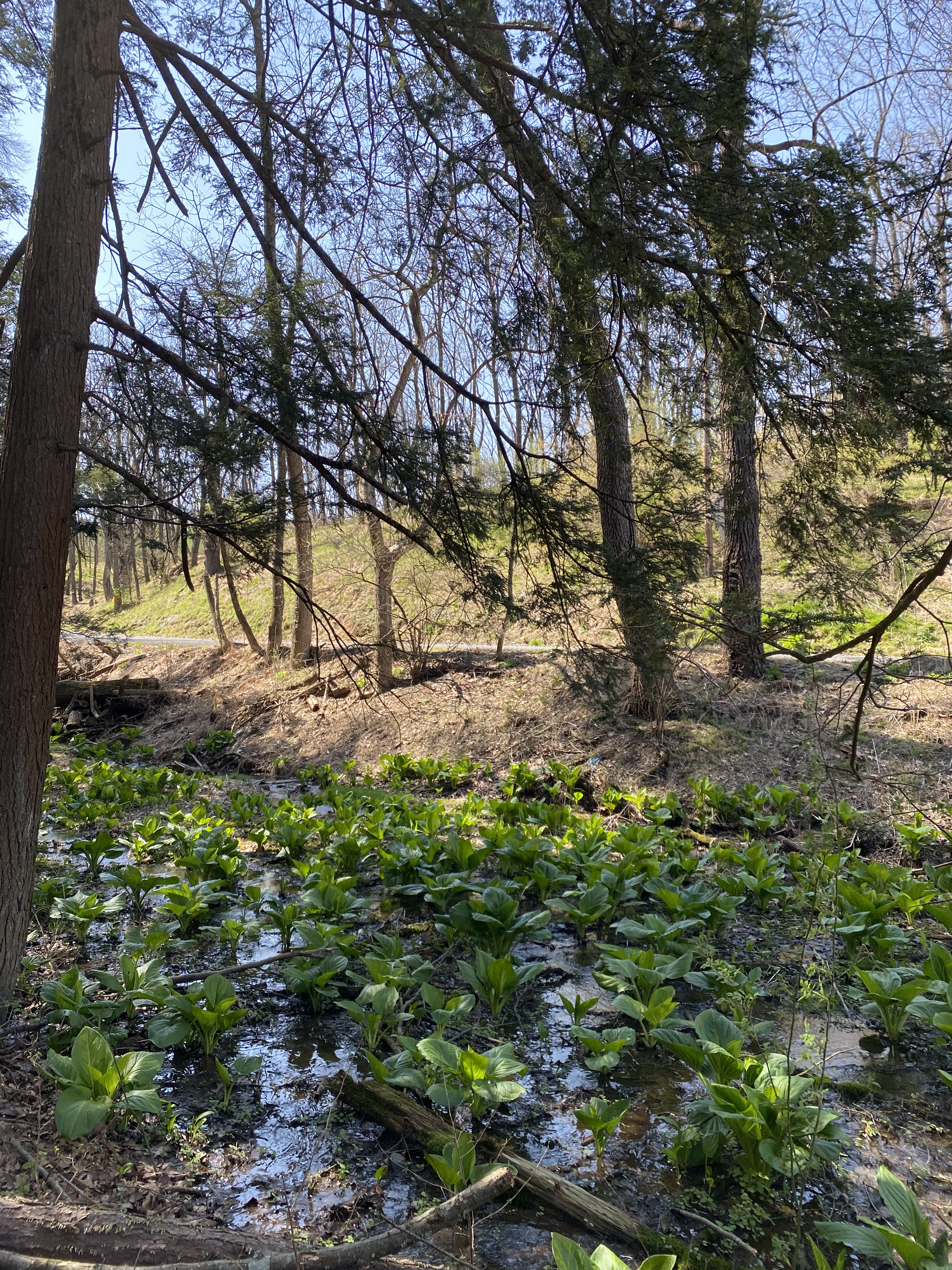
Plants growing in a stream bed at the Trexler Nature Preserve in Pennsylvania

== Toxicity ==
Since its roots are antispasmodic, diaphoretic, diuretic, emetic, expectorant, and slightly narcotic, it is not recommended to consume the raw plant directly. While high quantities of the root can produce nausea and vomiting, headaches, and dizziness, handling the fresh leaves can burn skin. Other symptoms of poisoning include swelling of the lip, throat, and tongue. This is due to calcium oxalate crystals, which are moderately harmful to humans. It is possible to eliminate the toxicity with care, such as changing the water frequently when boiling the leaves, or thoroughly drying the plant.

== Gallery ==
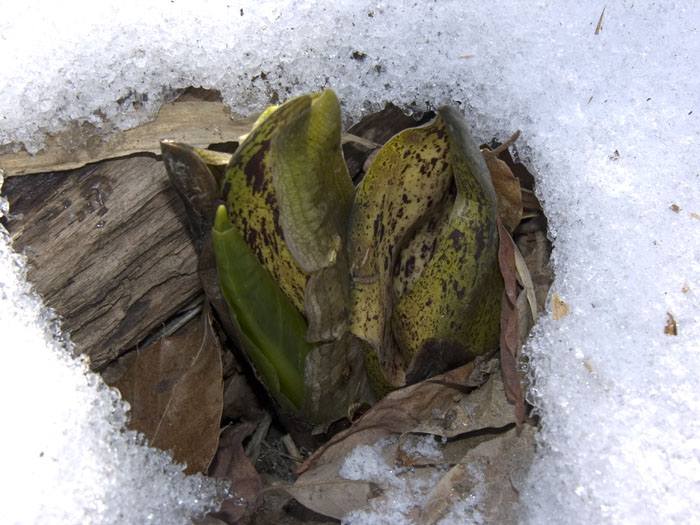
Eastern skunk cabbage melting a hole through snow.

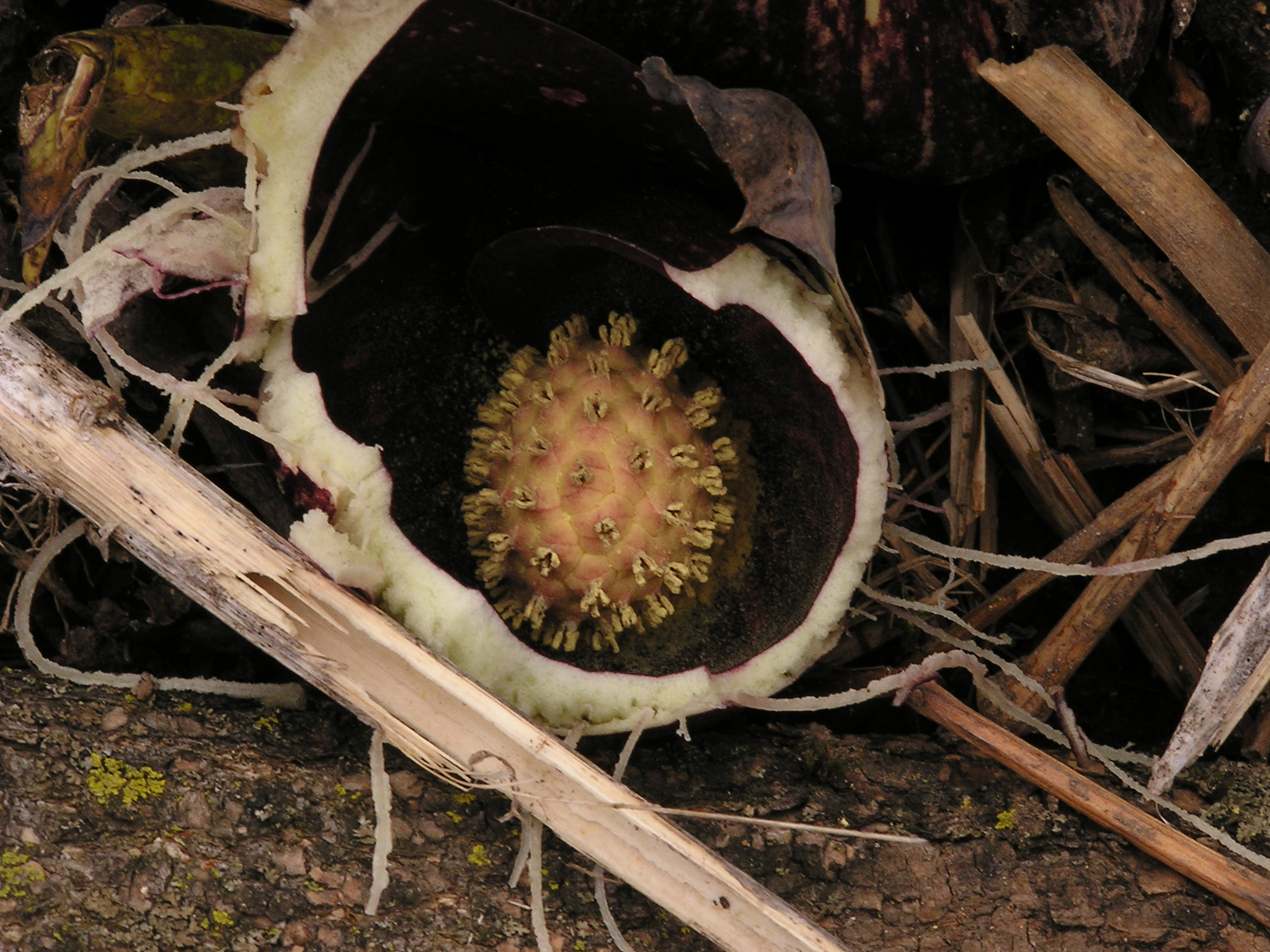
A cut-away view of the spadix (flower cluster) inside the spathe of the skunk cabbage.

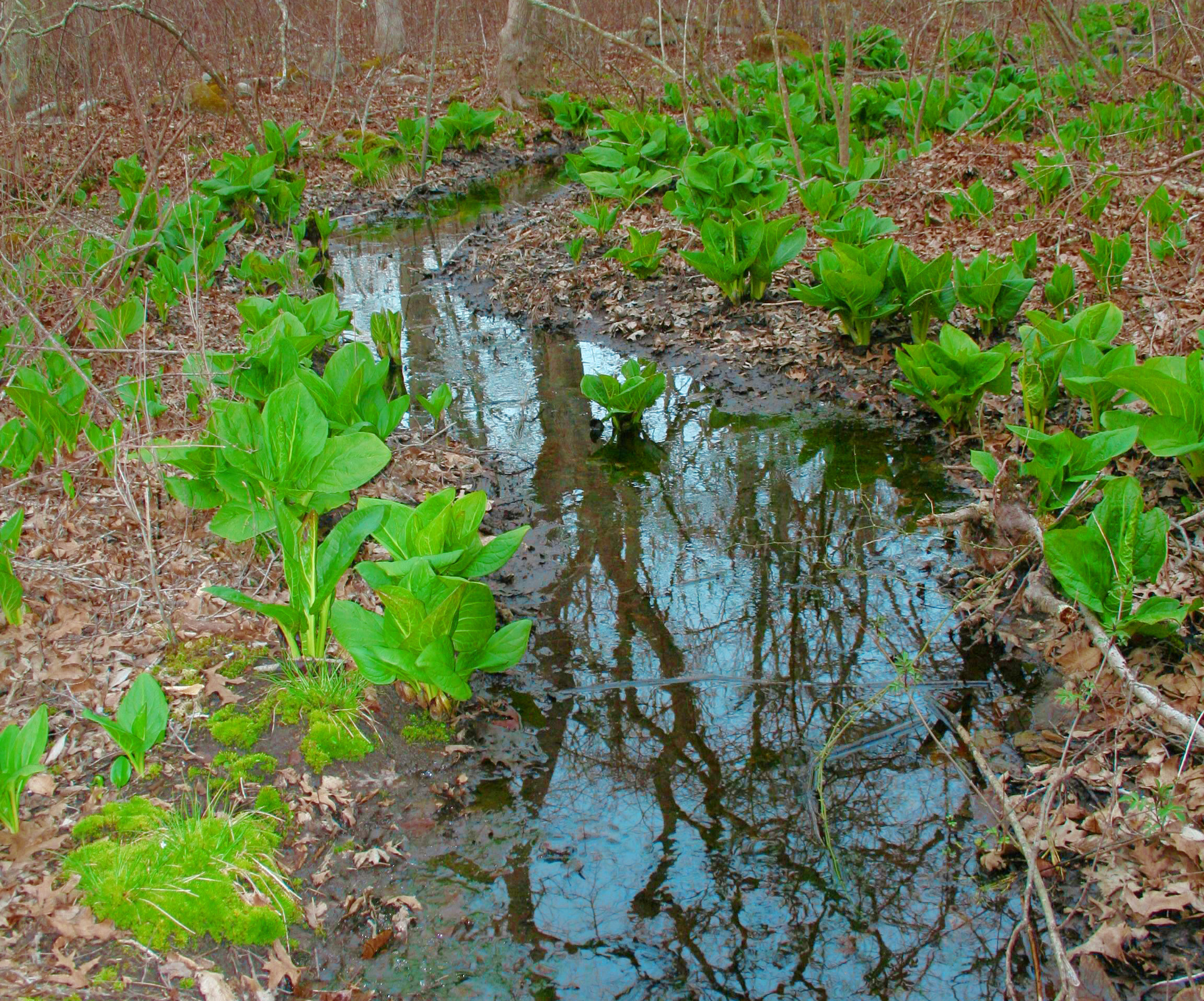
Early spring growth of eastern skunk cabbage along a flowing brook on the island of Martha's Vineyard

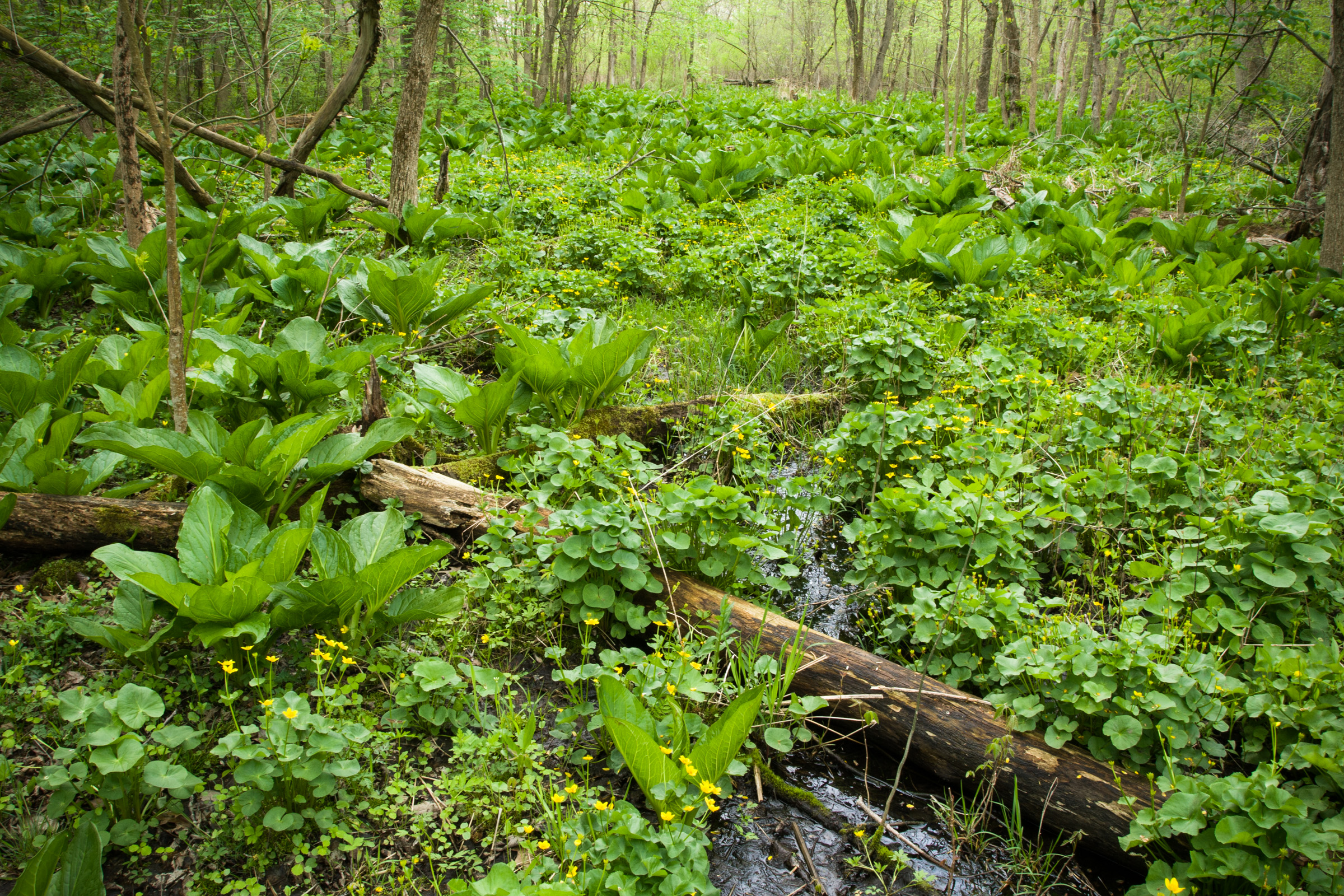
Skunk cabbage leaves and blooming marsh marigolds (Caltha palustris) in a wooded marsh

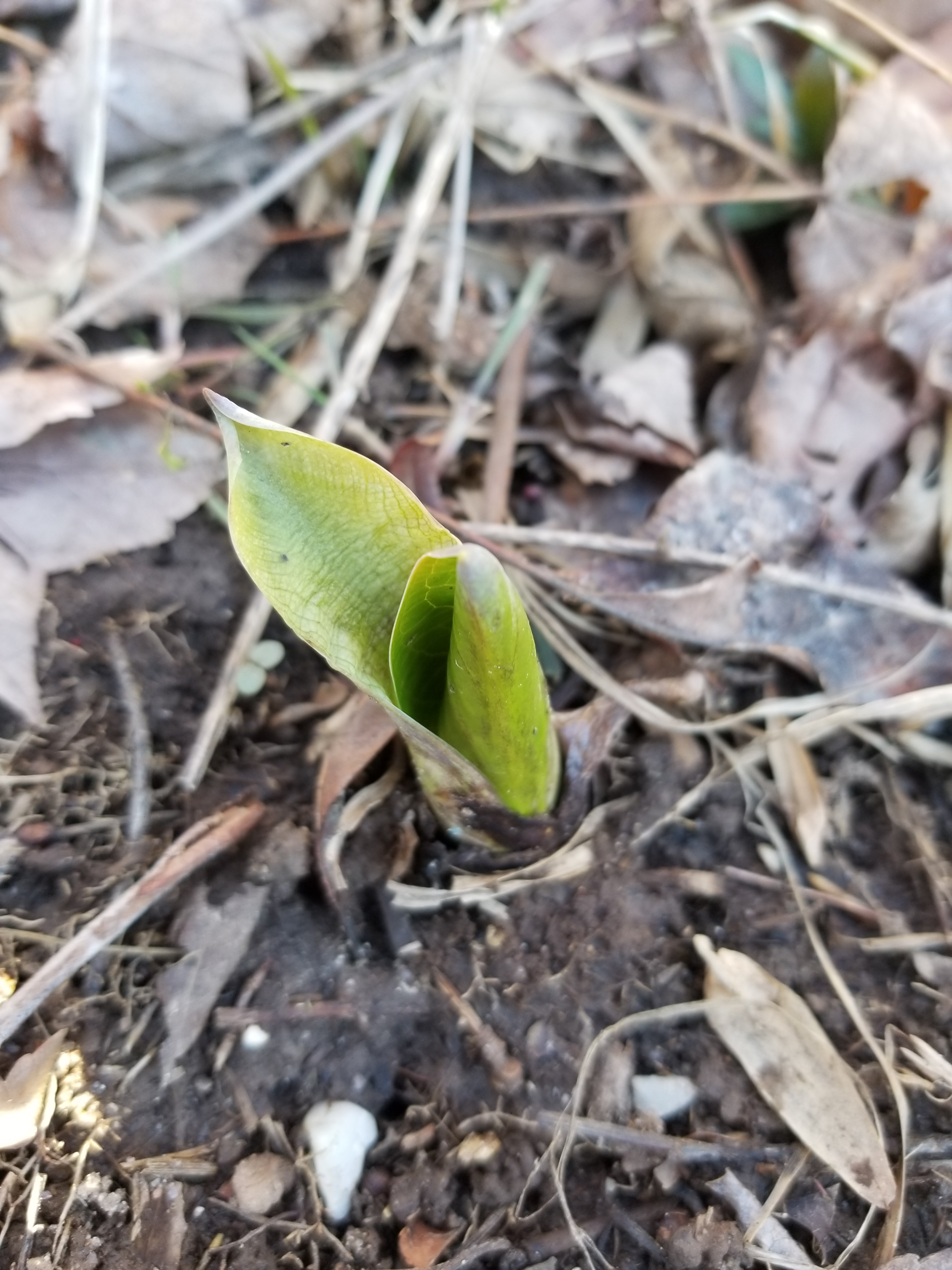
Skunk cabbage emerging from ground during winter

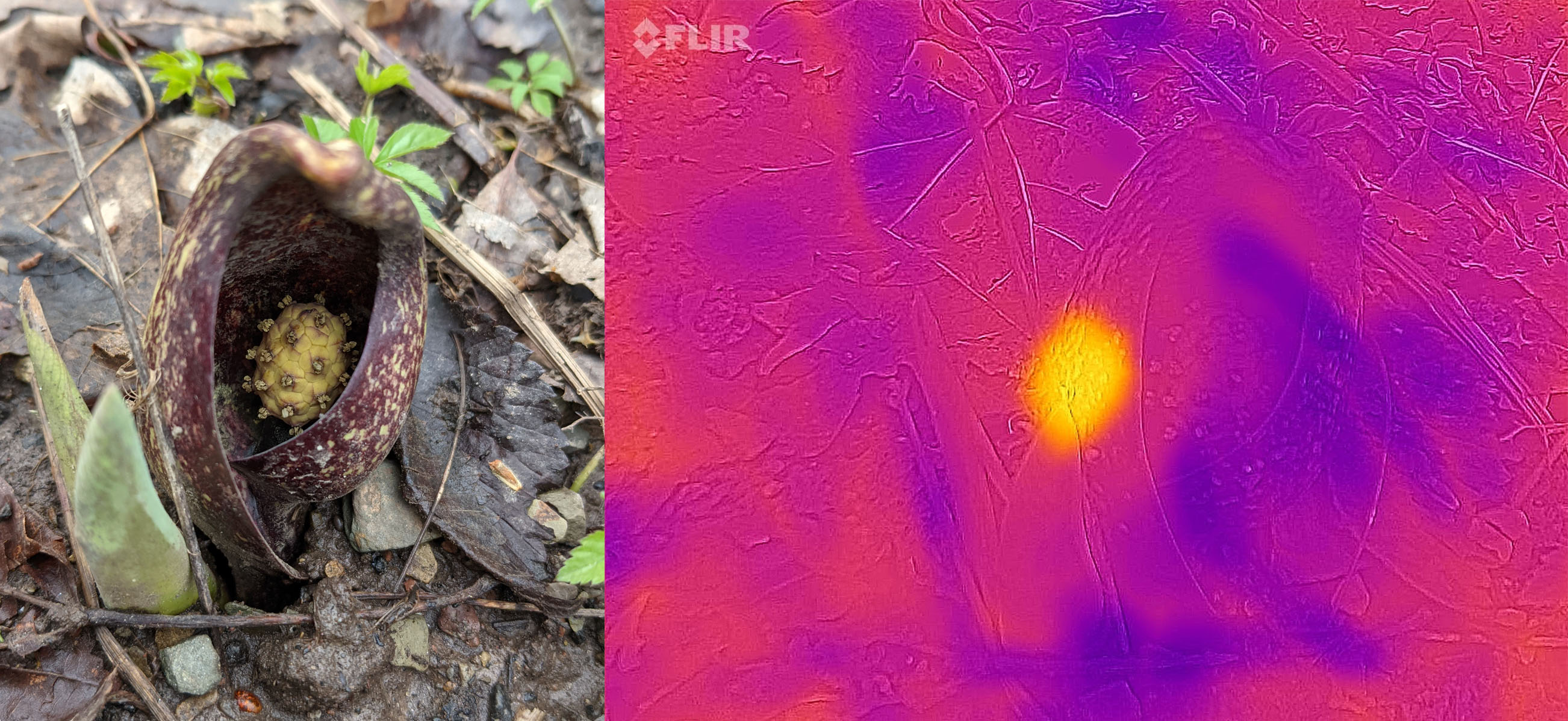
Thermal imaging of a newly emerged eastern skunk cabbage showing heat, via thermogenesis, in the spadix

== See also ==
- Lysichiton americanus (western skunk cabbage): also known for producing a foul smell, and often confused with eastern skunk cabbage
- Lysichiton camtschatcensis (Asian skunk cabbage): from north-east Asia, but not known for producing a foul smell
