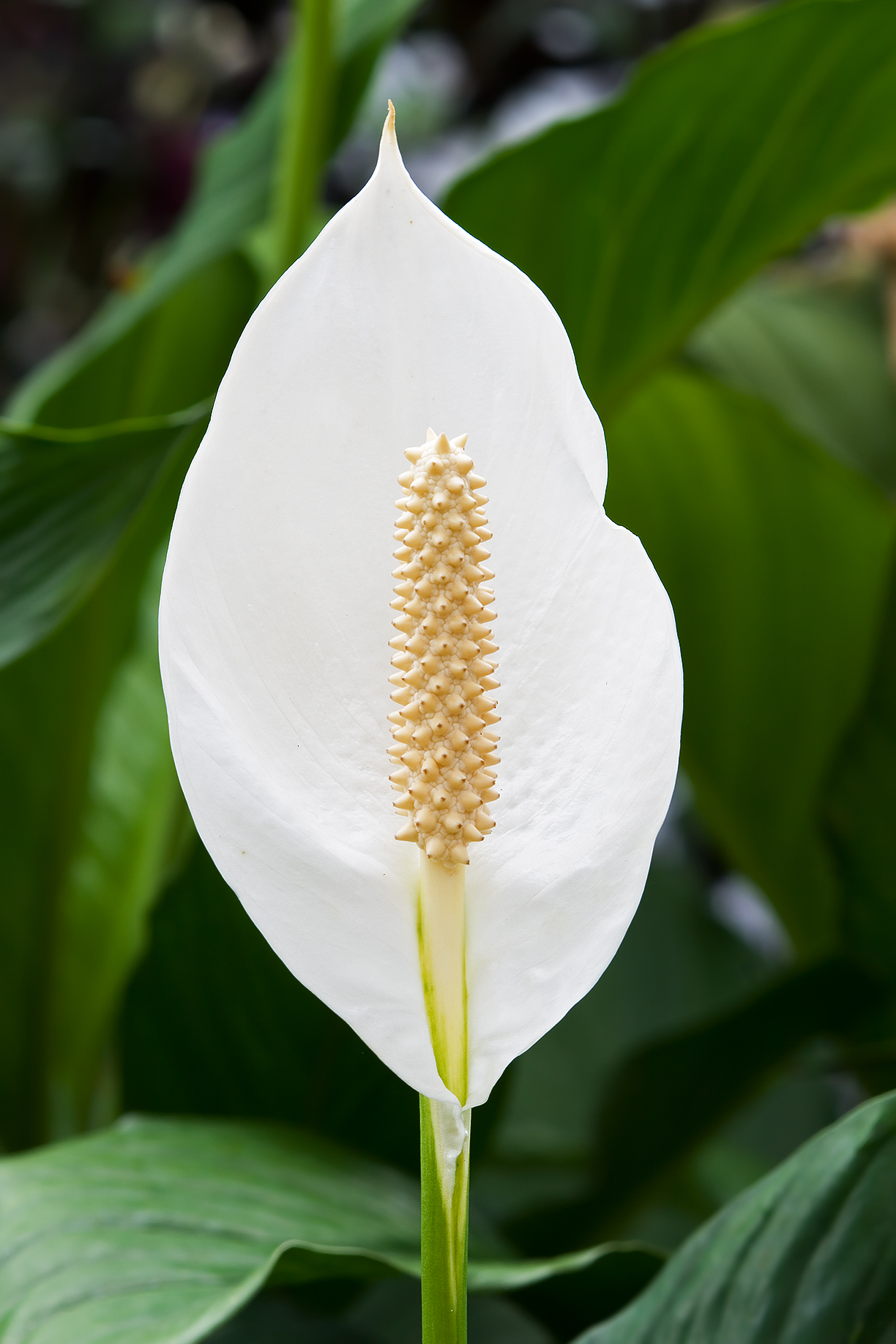
- Inflorescence of Spathiphyllum cochlearispathum

Scientific classification
- Kingdom: Plantae
- Clade: Tracheophytes
- Clade: Angiosperms
- Clade: Monocots
- Order: Alismatales
- Family: Araceae; Juss.

Subfamilies
- Gymnostachydoideae; Orontioideae; Lemnoideae; Pothoideae; Monsteroideae; Lasioideae; Zamioculcadoideae; Aroideae

= Araceae =

Araceae Temporal range: 115–0 Ma Early Cretaceous - Recent

Family of flowering plants

The Araceae are a family of monocotyledonous flowering plants in which flowers are borne on a type of inflorescence called a spadix. The spadix is usually accompanied by, and sometimes partially enclosed in, a spathe (or leaf-like bract). Also known as the arum family, members are often colloquially known as aroids. This family of 114 genera and about 3,750 known species is most diverse in the New World tropics, although also distributed in the Old World tropics and northern temperate regions.

== Description ==
Within the Araceae, species are often rhizomatous or tuberous; many are epiphytic, creeping lianas or vining plants, and the leaves and tissues of the entire plant nearly always contains irritating calcium oxalate crystals or raphides, in varying degrees. The foliage can vary considerably from species to species. The majority of species produce an inflorescence consisting of a spadix (which some compare to a corn cob, in appearance), which is nearly always surrounded by a modified leaf bract called a spathe. In monoecious aroids, possessing separate male and female flowers (but with both flowers present on one plant), the spadix is usually organized with female flowers towards the bottom and male flowers at the top. In aroids with perfect flowers, the stigma is no longer receptive when the pollen is released, thus preventing self-fertilization. Some species are dioecious.

Many plants in this family are thermogenic (heat-producing). Their flowers can reach up to 45 °C, even if the surrounding air temperature is much lower. One reason for this unusually high temperature is to attract insects (usually beetles) to pollinate the plant, rewarding the beetles with heat energy, in addition to preventing tissue damage in colder regions. Some examples of thermogenic aroids are Symplocarpus foetidus (eastern skunk-cabbage), Amorphophallus titanum (titan arum), Amorphophallus paeoniifolius (elephant-foot yam), Helicodiceros muscivorus (dead-horse arum lily), and Sauromatum venosum (voodoo lily). Some species, such as A. titanum and H. muscivorus, give off a very pungent smell akin to rotten meat, which serves to attract flies for pollination. The heat produced by the plant helps to convey the scent further.

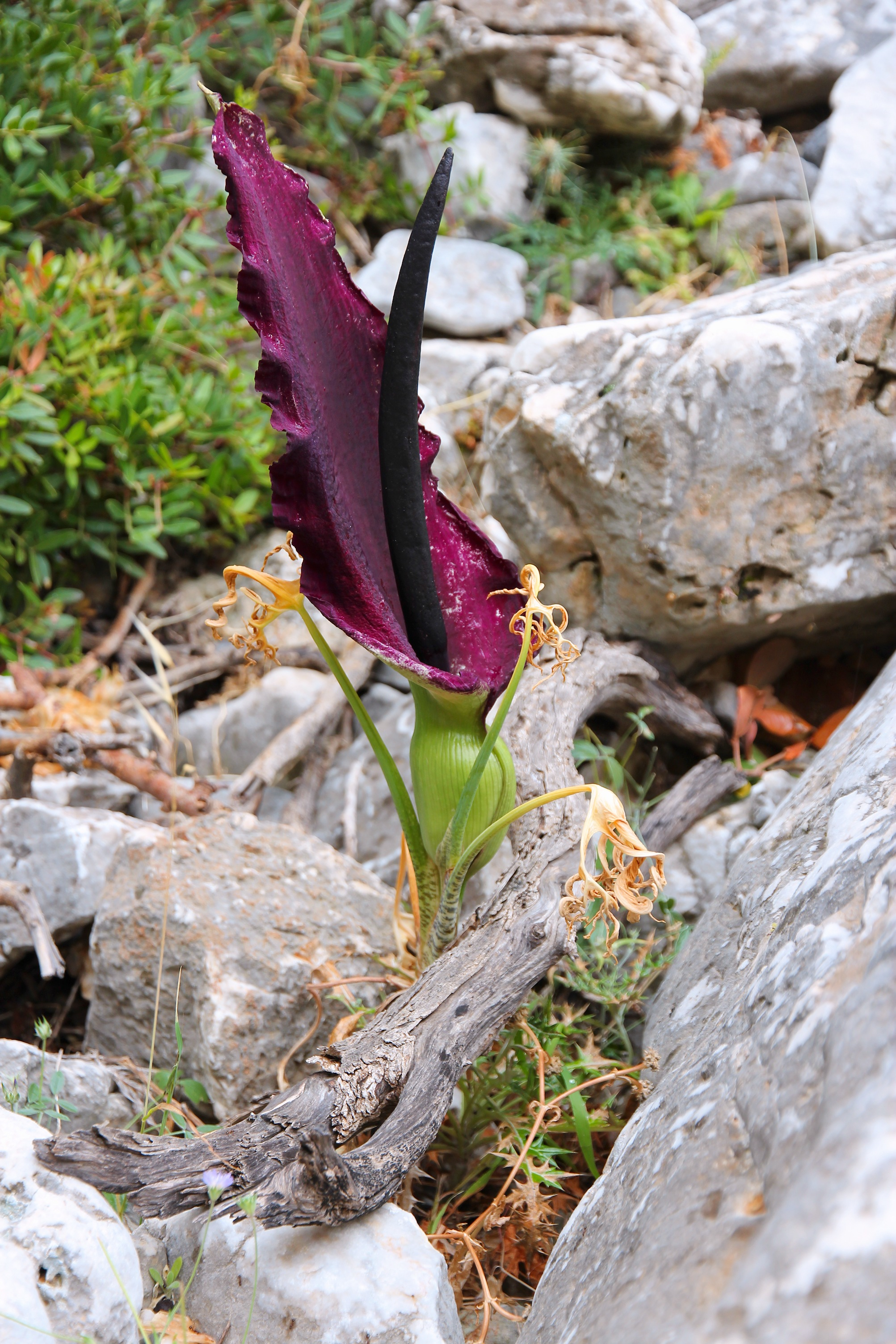
Snake lily, Dracunculus vulgaris, in Crete

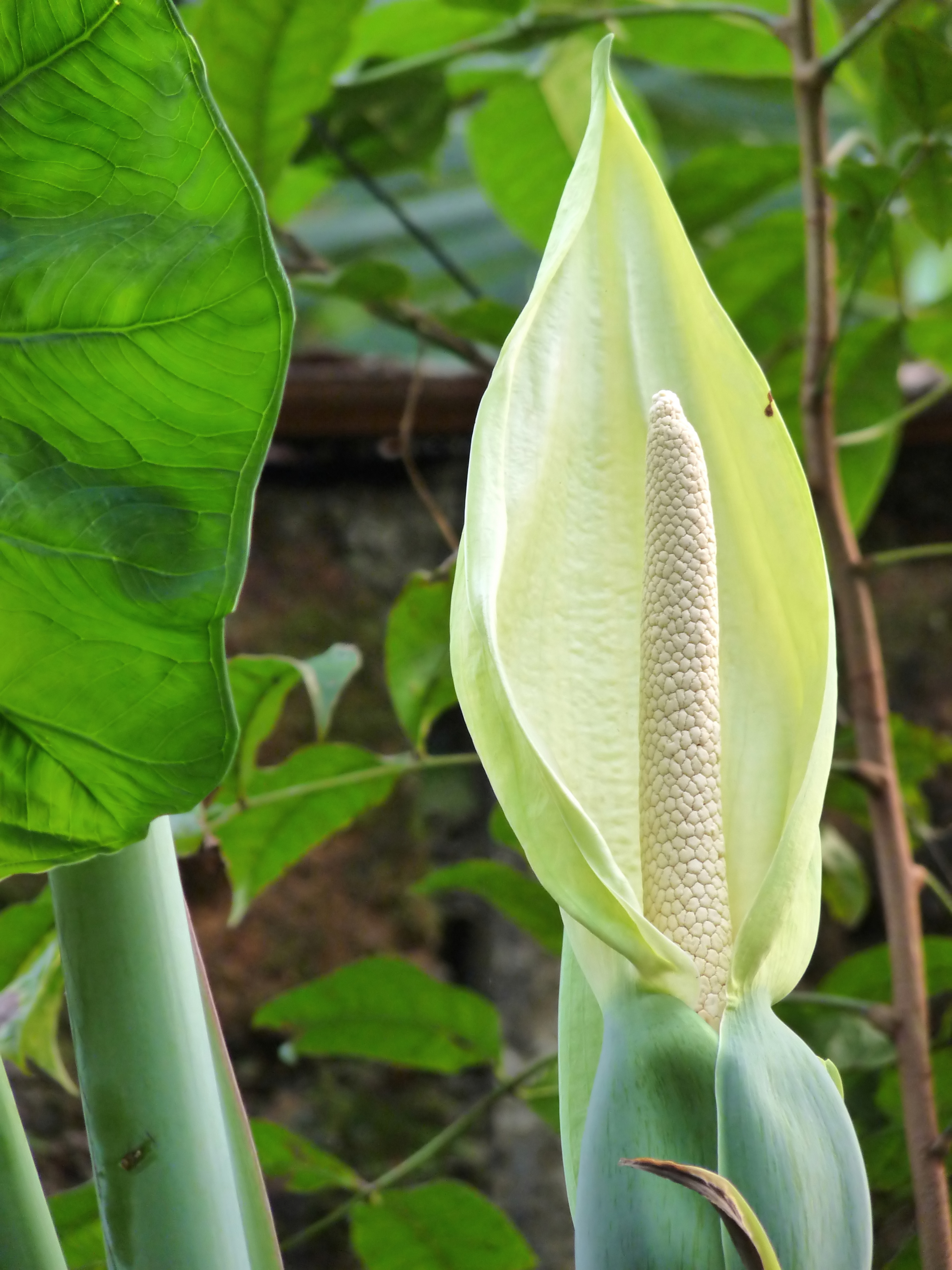
Arrowleaf elephant ear, Xanthosoma sagittifolium

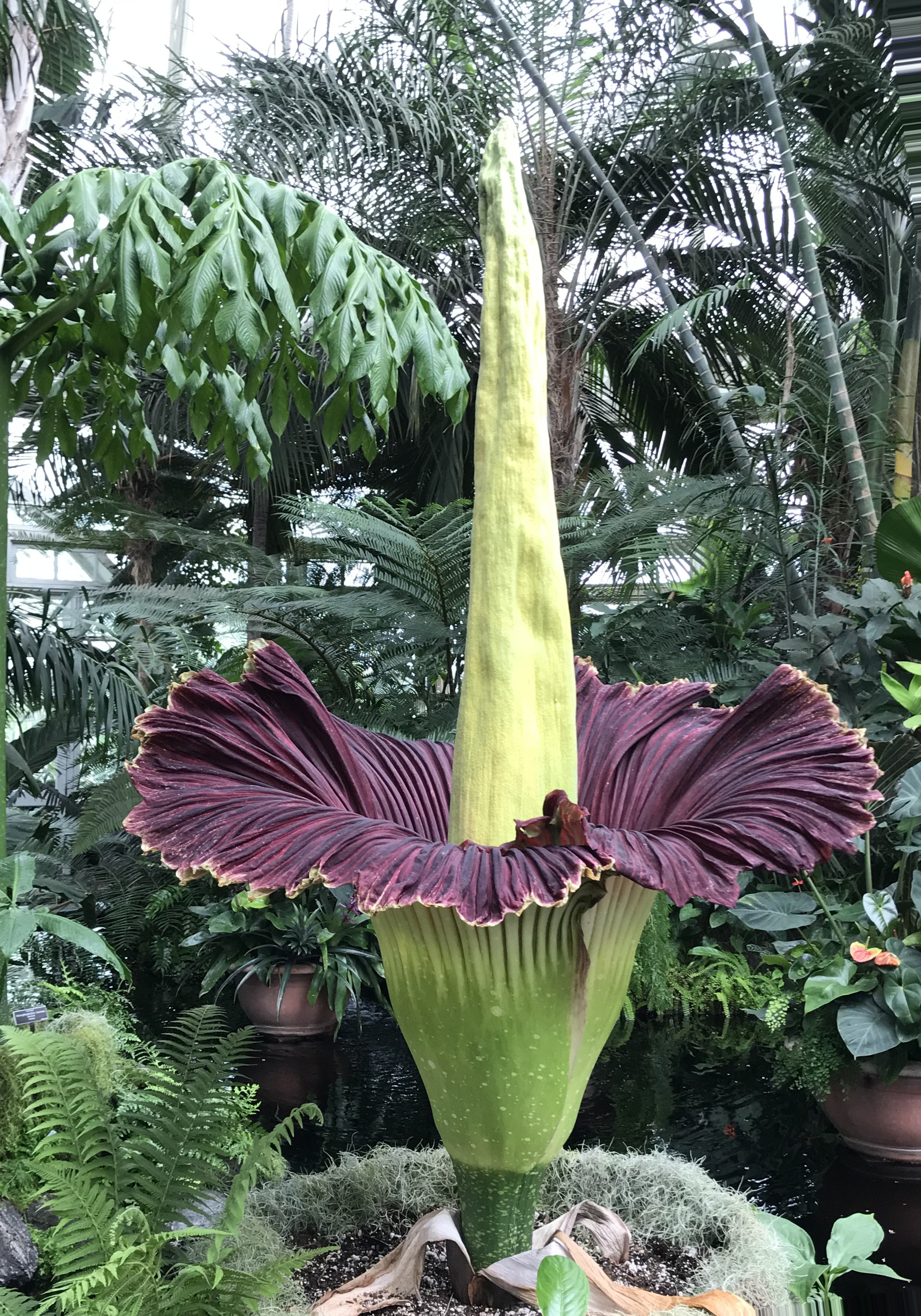
Corpse flower, Amorphophallus titanum, 2 or 3 metres tall

=== Toxicity ===
Within the Araceae family, the majority of species produce calcium oxalate crystals in the form of raphides. While it is possible to consume the cooked foliage of certain genera, such as Alocasia, Colocasia, and Xanthosoma, as well as the ripened fruits of Monstera deliciosa, these raphide compounds are irritating (and even dangerous) for many animals, including humans. Consumption of raw aroid vegetation may cause edema, vesicle formation or dysphagia, accompanied by a painful stinging and burning in the mouth and throat, with symptoms occurring for up to two weeks, depending on amount consumed. In smaller amounts, patients report feeling a mild to extreme sensation of sand or glass in the esophagus and mouth, lasting up to 48 hours. Additionally, in heavier instances of ingestion, anaphylactic shock could cause swelling of the throat, restricting breathing. The genus Dieffenbachia is famously known as "dumb-cane" for this reason; however, given the presence of irritating compounds across the family, this nickname may be applied to virtually any genera within the Araceae.

== Taxonomy ==
=== Phylogeny ===
Phylogeny based on the Angiosperm Phylogeny Website.

- Araceae
  - - Gymnostachydoideae Bogner & Nicolson 1991
    - Orontioideae Brown ex Müller 1860
  - - Lemnoideae
    - - - Pothoideae Engler 1876
        - Monsteroideae Engler 1876
      - - Lasioideae Engler 1876
        - - Zamioculcadoideae Bogner & Hesse 2005
          - Aroideae Arnott 1832

=== Classification ===
One of the earliest observations of species in the Araceae was conducted by Theophrastus in his work Enquiry into Plants. The Araceae were not recognized as a distinct group of plants until the 16th century. In 1789, Antoine Laurent de Jussieu classified all climbing aroids as Pothos and all terrestrial aroids as either Arum or Dracontium in his book Familles des Plantes.

The first major system of classification for the family was produced by Heinrich Wilhelm Schott, who published Genera Aroidearum in 1858 and Prodromus Systematis Aroidearum in 1860. Schott's system was based on floral characteristics, and used a narrow conception of a genus. Adolf Engler produced a classification in 1876, which was steadily refined up to 1920. His system is significantly different from Schott's, being based more on vegetative characters and anatomy. The two systems were to some extent rivals, with Engler's having more adherents before the advent of molecular phylogenetics brought new approaches.

A comprehensive taxonomy of Araceae was published by Mayo et al. in 1997.

Modern studies based on gene sequences show the Araceae (including the Lemnoideae, duckweeds) to be monophyletic, and the first diverging group within the Alismatales. The APG III system of 2009 recognizes the family, including the genera formerly segregated in the Lemnaceae. The sinking of the Lemnaceae into the Araceae was not immediately universally accepted. For example, the 2010 New Flora of the British Isles used a paraphyletic Araceae and a separate Lemnaceae. However Lemna and its allies were incorporated in Araceae in the 2019 edition. A comprehensive genomic study of Spirodela polyrhiza was published in February 2014.

=== Genera ===
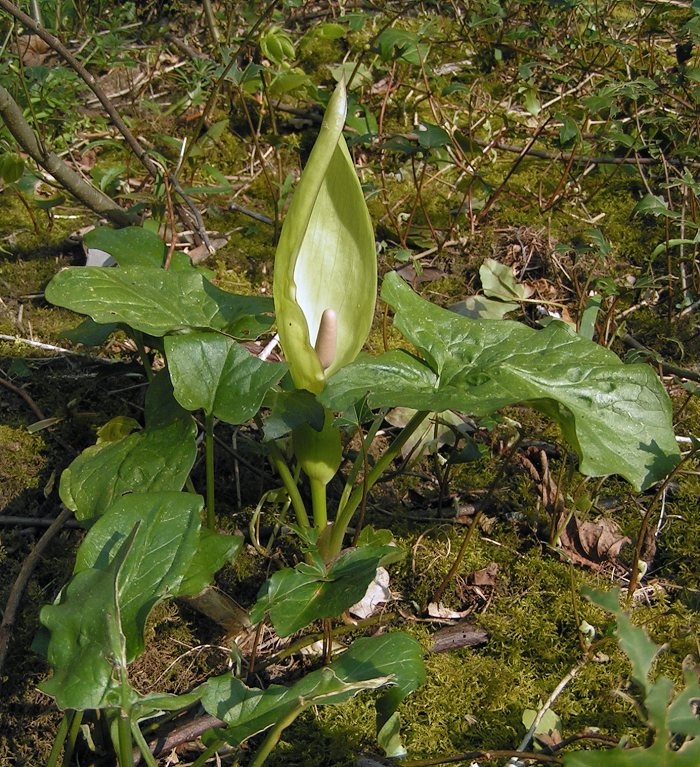
The cuckoo-pint or lords and ladies (Arum maculatum) is a common arum in British woodlands.

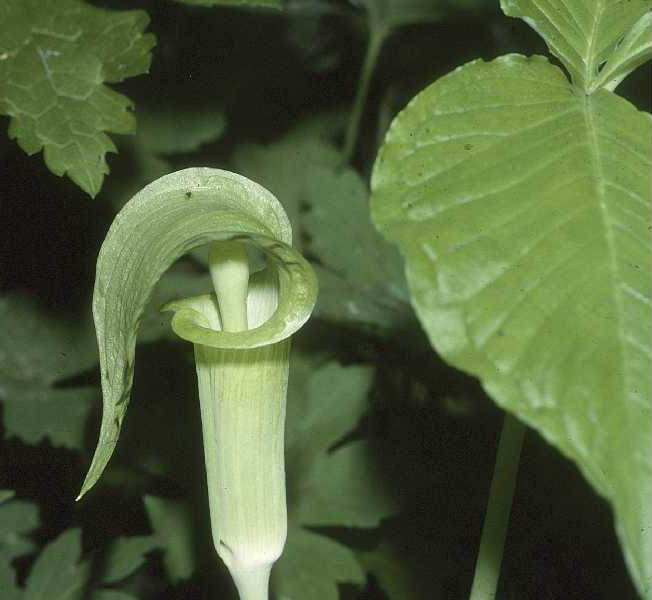
Arisaema triphyllum

143 genera are accepted within the Araceae. Anthurium, Epipremnum, Monstera, Philodendron and Zantedeschia are some of the most well-known genera of the family, as are the Colocasia (taro, arbi) and Xanthosoma ('elephant-ear', ‘ape), which are both cultivated for human consumption. The largest unbranched inflorescence in the world is that of the arum Amorphophallus titanum (titan arum).

The Araceae includes many ornamental genera of global economic importance: Aglaonema, Alocasia, Anthurium, Caladium, Dieffenbachia, Epipremnum, Homalomena, Monstera, Nephthytis, Rhaphidophora, Scindapsus, Spathiphyllum, Syngonium, and Zamioculcas, to name but a few. The aquatic genera Anubias, Bucephalandra and Cryptocoryne are highly prized and cultivated aquarium plants; other, recently-described genera, such as the Lagenandra of India, are gradually becoming more known in the aquascaping world. Philodendron is an important genus in the ecosystems of neotropical rainforests, and is widely used in home and interior decorating. Symplocarpus foetidus (skunk cabbage) is a common eastern North American species. An interesting peculiarity is that this family includes the largest unbranched inflorescence, that of the titan arum, often erroneously called the "largest flower", and the smallest flowering plant and smallest fruit, in the duckweed, Wolffia.

== Fossil record ==
The family Araceae has one of the oldest fossil record among angiosperms, with fossil forms first appearing during the Early Cretaceous epoch. The oldest of which is Mayoa portugallica from Barremian- Aptian of Torres Vedras, Portugal Notable fossils from the Early Cretaceous include: Spixiarum kipea, an aroid from the late Aptian of Brazil; Orontiophyllum ferreri, an aroid leaf from the late Albian of Spain; and Turolospadix bogneri, an aroid spadix from the late Albian of Spain.

== Food plants ==
Food plants in the family Araceae include Amorphophallus paeoniifolius (elephant foot yam), Colocasia esculenta (kochu, taro, dasheen), Xanthosoma (cocoyam, tannia), Typhonium trilobatum and Monstera deliciosa (Mexican breadfruit). While the aroids are little traded, and overlooked by plant breeders to the extent that the Crop Trust calls them "orphan crops", they are widely grown and are important in subsistence agriculture and in local markets. The main food product is the corm, which is high in starch; leaves and flowers also find culinary use.

== See also ==
- List of foliage plant diseases (Araceae)
