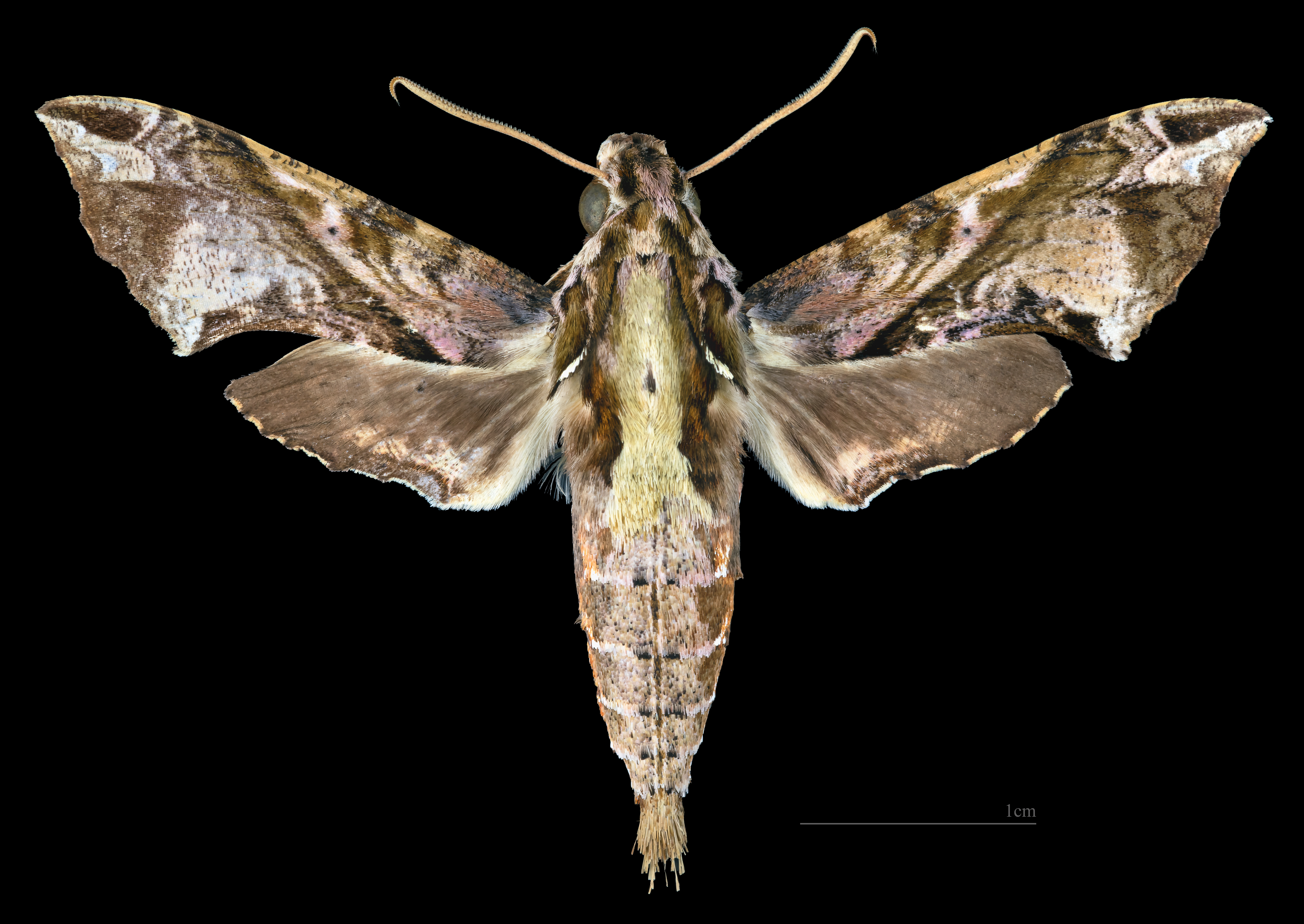
- Male dorsal
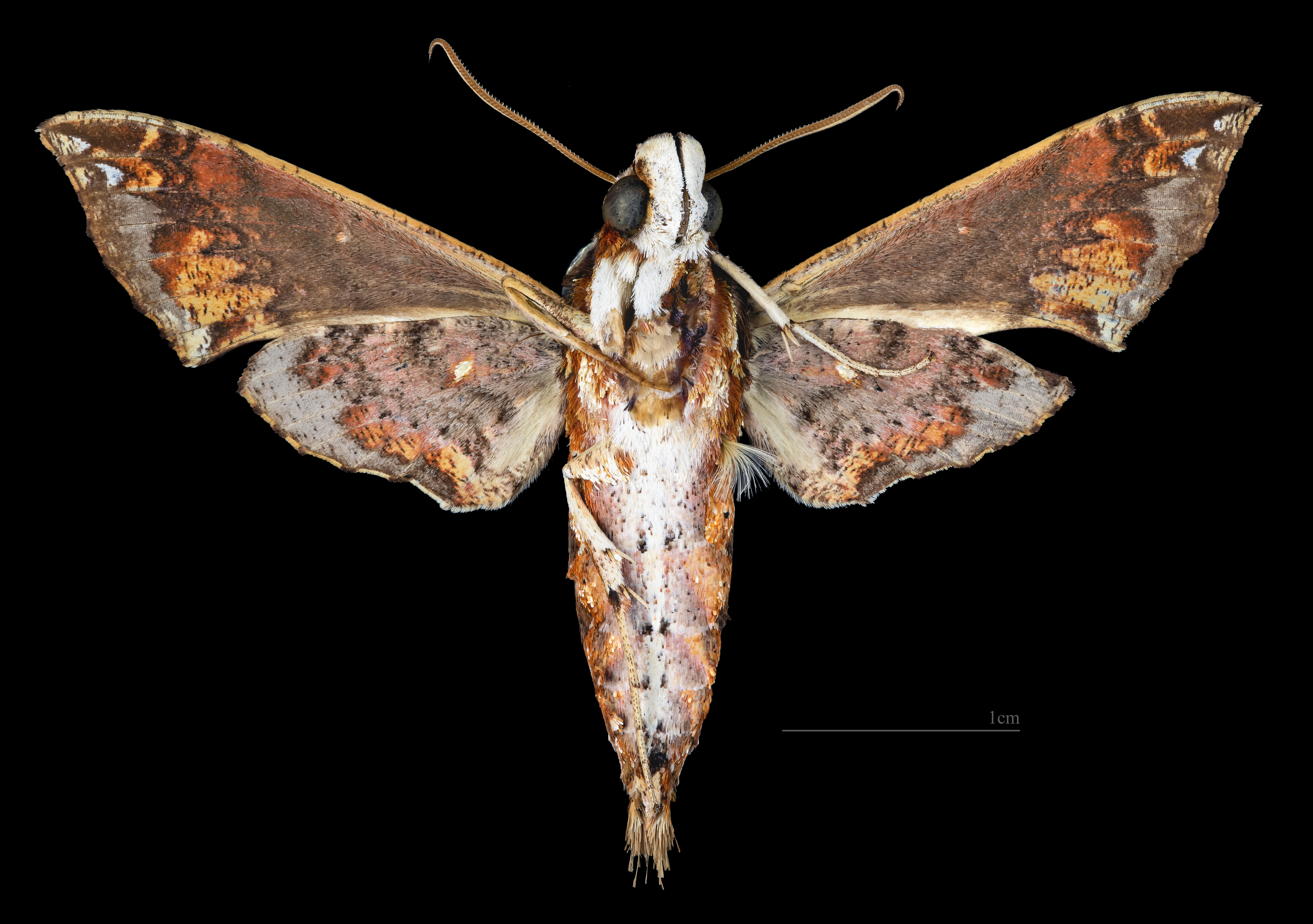
- Male ventral

Scientific classification
- Kingdom: Animalia
- Phylum: Arthropoda
- Class: Insecta
- Order: Lepidoptera
- Family: Sphingidae
- Genus: Eupanacra
- Species: E. elegantulus

Binomial name
- Eupanacra elegantulus (Herrich-Schaffer, 1856)

Synonyms
- Thyreus elegantulus Herrich-Schäffer, 1856; Panacra variegata Rothschild, 1894; Panacra perakana Rothschild, 1894; Eupanacra elegantulus brunnea Closs, 1916

= Eupanacra elegantulus =

Species of moth

Eupanacra elegantulus is a moth of the family Sphingidae. It is known from south-east Asia, including Singapore, Thailand, Malaysia, Indonesia, and the Philippines.

It is similar to Eupanacra mydon, except for the pattern elements found on the upperside of the forewing which are much clearer. Furthermore, the discal spot is larger in males and more prominent in females since these have a paler ground colour. There are two rows of black dots and a large black spot on the underside of the abdomen.

The larvae have been recorded feeding on Aglaonema, Alocasia, Dieffenbachia, Syngonium and Monstera deliciosa. Young larvae are slender, pale green and have a straight pale pink spine at the end of their bodies. Feeding takes place at the underside of the leaves of their host. They rest near the base of the stems. There are green and brown forms of the last instar larvae. Pupation takes place in a loose silken cocoon, which includes some debris.

Life stages

The stages of life of this moth include being a caterpillar, it enters pre-pupation and changes into a darker color and into the brown moth with black spots. Young larvae are green with light pink spines. It feeds on leaves to grow.
