= S. poeppigii =

S. poeppigii may refer to:

- Scleria poeppigii, a flowering plant
- Senecio poeppigii, a flowering plant
- Siparuna poeppigii, an aromatic evergreen
- Streptocalyx poeppigii, a plant native to Panama and northern South America
- Syngonium poeppigii, an aroid native to Latin America
