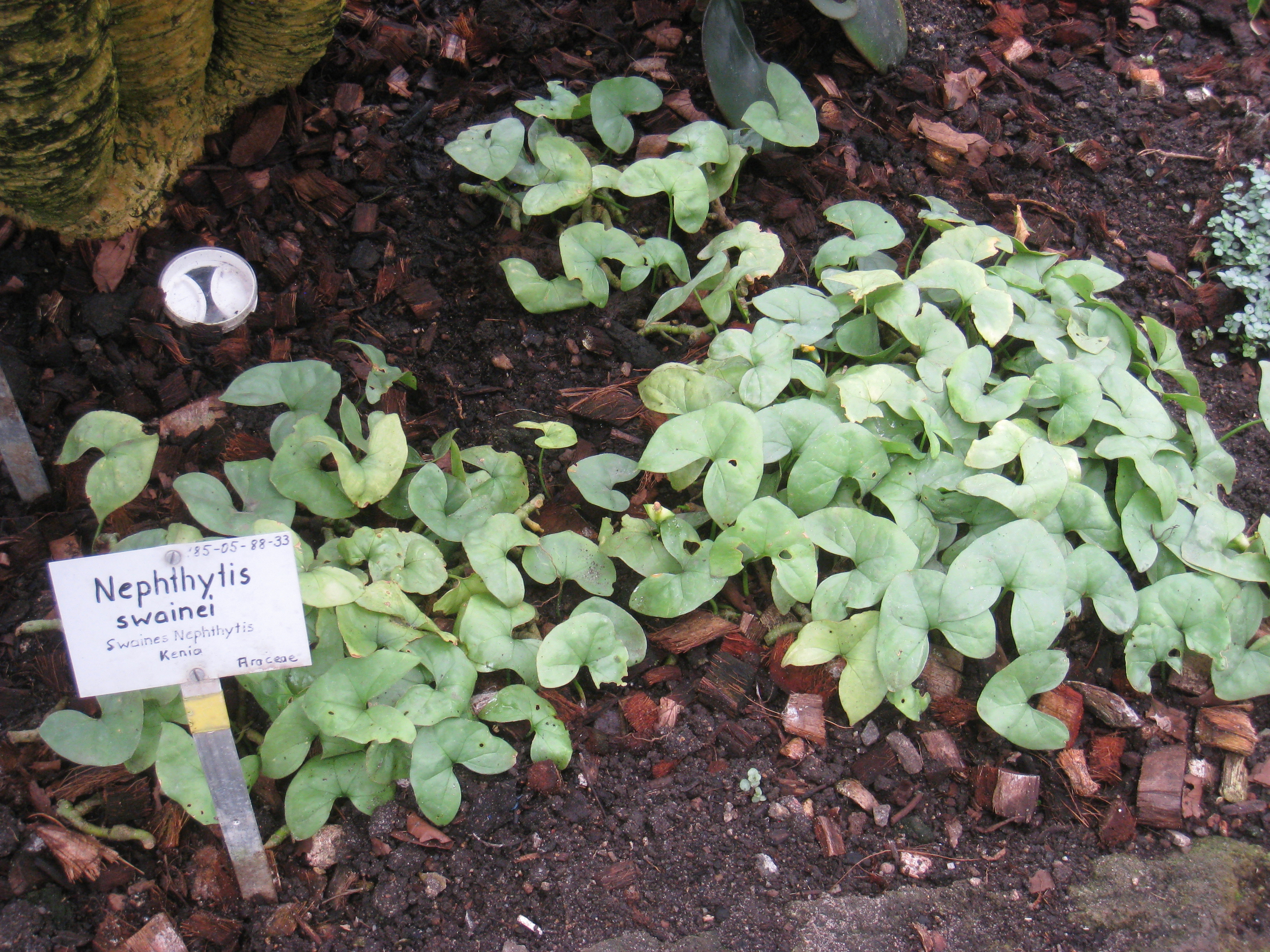

Scientific classification
- Kingdom: Plantae
- Clade: Tracheophytes
- Clade: Angiosperms
- Clade: Monocots
- Order: Alismatales
- Family: Araceae
- Genus: Nephthytis
- Species: N. swainei

Binomial name
- Nephthytis swainei Bogner

= Nephthytis swainei =

Species of flowering plant

Nephthytis swainei is a species of flowering plants in the family Araceae, native to tropical West Africa (Ivory Coast, Ghana, Congo-Brazzaville, Gabon, Cameroon).
