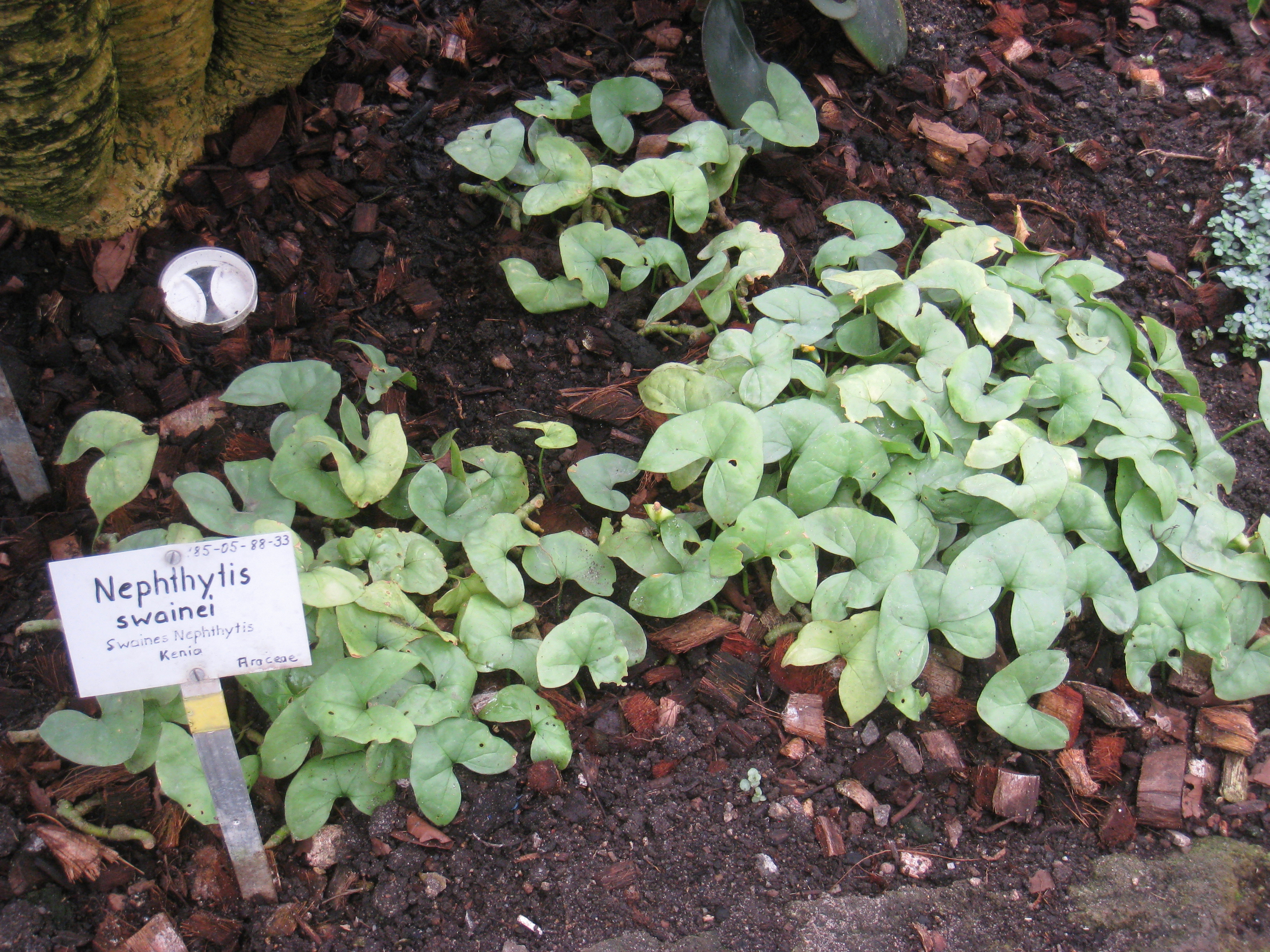
- Nephthytis swainei

Scientific classification
- Kingdom: Plantae
- Clade: Tracheophytes
- Clade: Angiosperms
- Clade: Monocots
- Order: Alismatales
- Family: Araceae
- Subfamily: Aroideae
- Tribe: Nephthytideae
- Genus: Nephthytis; Schott (1857)

Synonyms
- Oligogynium Engl.

= Nephthytis =

Genus of flowering plants

Nephthytis is a genus of five species of flowering plants in the family Araceae, native to tropical western and west-central Africa, ranging from Guinea to the Republic of the Congo.

They are herbaceous plants growing from a rhizome. The leaves are evergreen, light and dark green, 15–35 cm long, and are usually arrowhead-shaped, with three lobes. The leaf shape can vary depending on the age of the plant.

== Cultivation ==
Some species are popular houseplants. If so, they must be kept away from any pets, as they are poisonous. When grown indoors as a decorative houseplant, it needs frequent watering to keep the soil moist. It prefers temperatures that are comfortable to humans, as with most plants. It functions well as a hanging or terrarium plant. The most common of its problems is root rot and can be avoided by providing adequate drainage. This can also be caused by allowing the plant to sit in water. As for other problems, scale insects can also affect it. If this happens, scrape them off and isolate the plant. For this kind of problem, pesticides and sprays do not always work as the shell of the insect protects it. If this becomes a severe problem, you will have to get rid of the plant. Also if this happens, make sure it is moved away from any other surrounding plants because the bugs could infect them as well. Other than that, this plant is very easy to take care of and thus, it is good for beginners. Propagation of Nephthytis is fairly easy as well. It can be propagated by layering and from cuttings.

Certain Nephthytis species are poisonous to cats and dogs. Symptoms are oral irritation and vomiting.

=== Syngonium podophyllum ===
An unrelated American species, Syngonium podophyllum, commonly grown as a houseplant, was originally confused with the similar-looking Nephthytis. It still retains Nephthytis as a common name, though it was given its own genus in 1879.

== Species ==
Five species are accepted.

1. Nephthytis afzelii Schott - West Africa from Congo-Brazzaville to Sierra Leone
2. Nephthytis hallaei Bogner - Gabon
3. Nephthytis mayombensis de Namur & Bogner - Congo-Brazzaville
4. Nephthytis poissonii (Engl.) N.E.Br. - Congo-Brazzaville, Gulf of Guinea Islands, Gabon, Cameroon, Nigeria
5. Nephthytis swainei Bogner - Ivory Coast, Ghana, Congo-Brazzaville, Gabon, Cameroon

=== Formerly placed here ===
- Boycea bintuluensis (A.Hay, Bogner & P.C.Boyce) A.Hay (as Nephthytis bintuluensis A.Hay, Bogner & P.C.Boyce)
