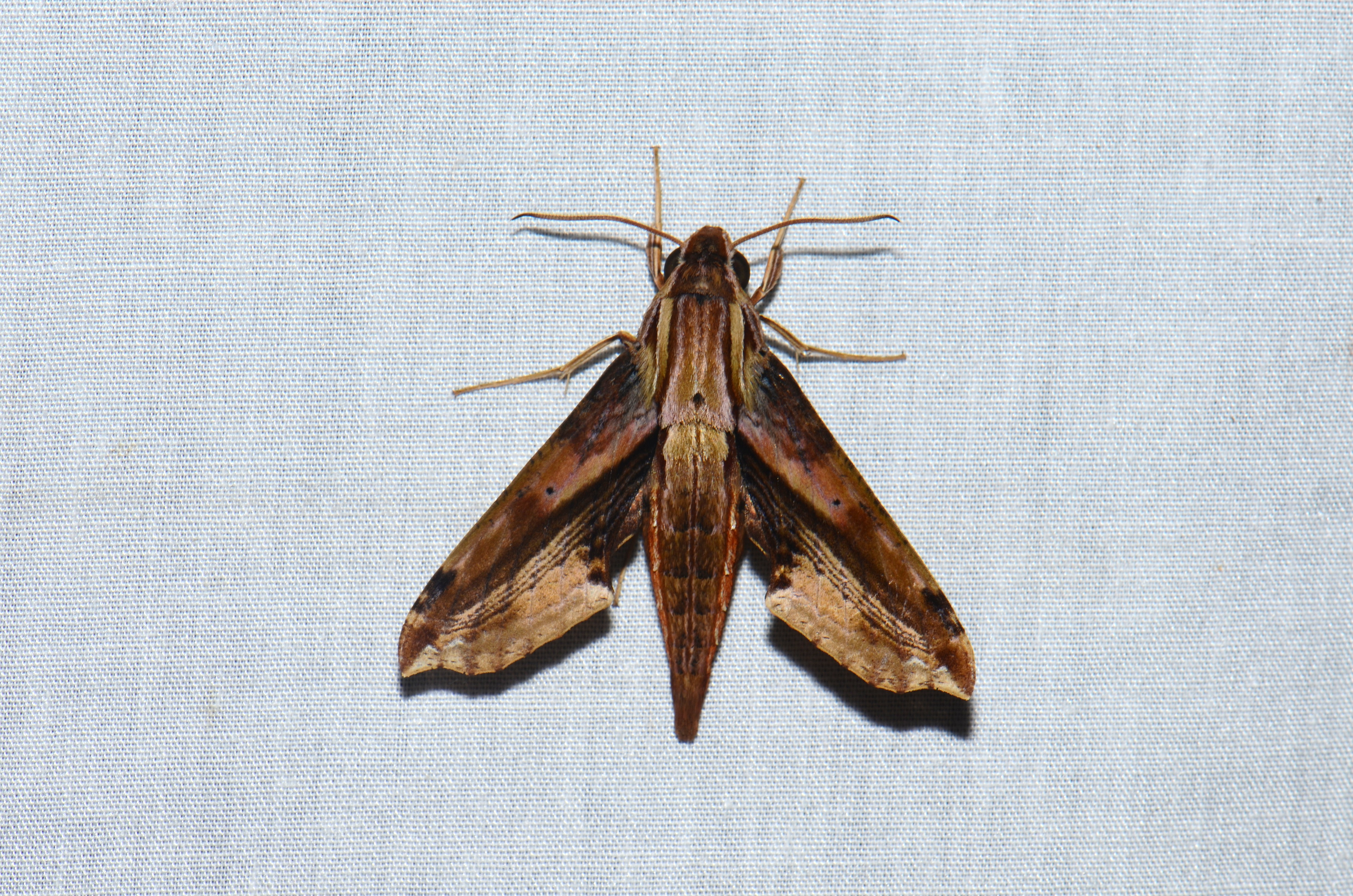

Scientific classification
- Kingdom: Animalia
- Phylum: Arthropoda
- Class: Insecta
- Order: Lepidoptera
- Family: Sphingidae
- Genus: Eupanacra
- Species: E. mydon

Binomial name
- Eupanacra mydon (Walker, 1856)

Synonyms
- Panacra mydon Walker, 1856; Panacra scapularis Walker, 1856; Panacra frena Swinhoe, 1892; Panacra argenteus Clark, 1928; Chaerocampa jasion Herrich-Schäffer, 1858; Panacra mydon septentrionalis Mell, 1922; Panacra mydon pallidior Mell, 1922; Choerocampa scapularis arachtus (Boisduval, 1875)

= Eupanacra mydon =

Species of moth

Eupanacra mydon, the common rippled hawkmoth, is a moth of the family Sphingidae.

== Distribution ==
It is known from Nepal, north-eastern India, Bangladesh, Myanmar, southern China, Thailand, Vietnam and Peninsular Malaysia.

== Description ==
The wingspan is 53–62 mm. The sexes are dimorphic, the brown of the ground colour and darker markings of the female being somewhat more reddish. The wing margins are somewhat scalloped and the forewing is slightly excavate below the apex. There is a pale gold apical fringe consisting of a few large, metallic scales on the tegula. The middle of the thorax and anterior abdominal tergites are broadly greyish-clay. The abdomen upperside has a few racket-shaped white scales. The forewing upperside shaded with brown in both sexes, the male is not much paler than the female. The forewing underside has a submarginal line which runs parallel to the distal margin. The hindwing upperside has a fringe which is heavily marked with black, while the hindwing underside has a brown marginal band.

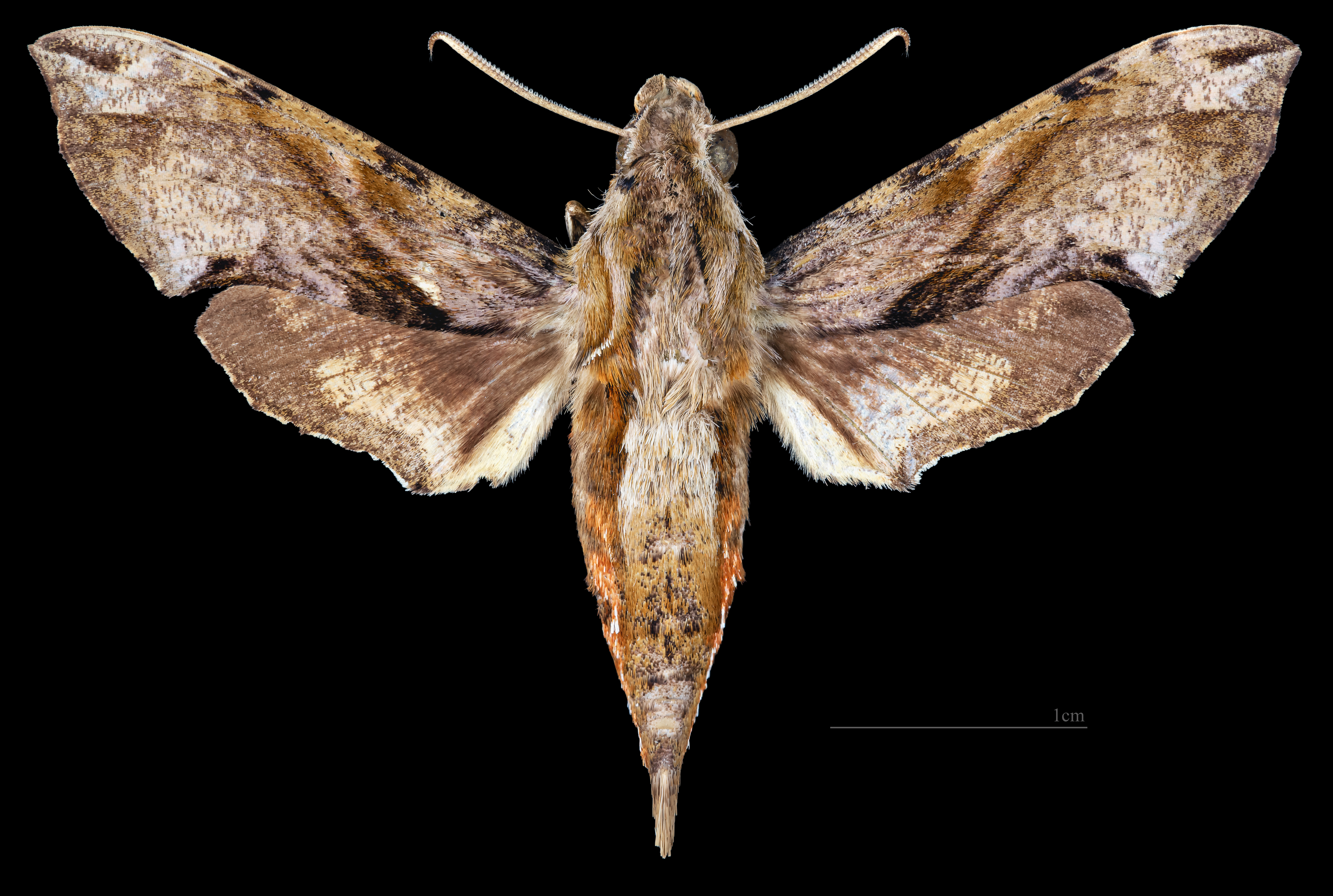
Eupanacra mydon male dorsal

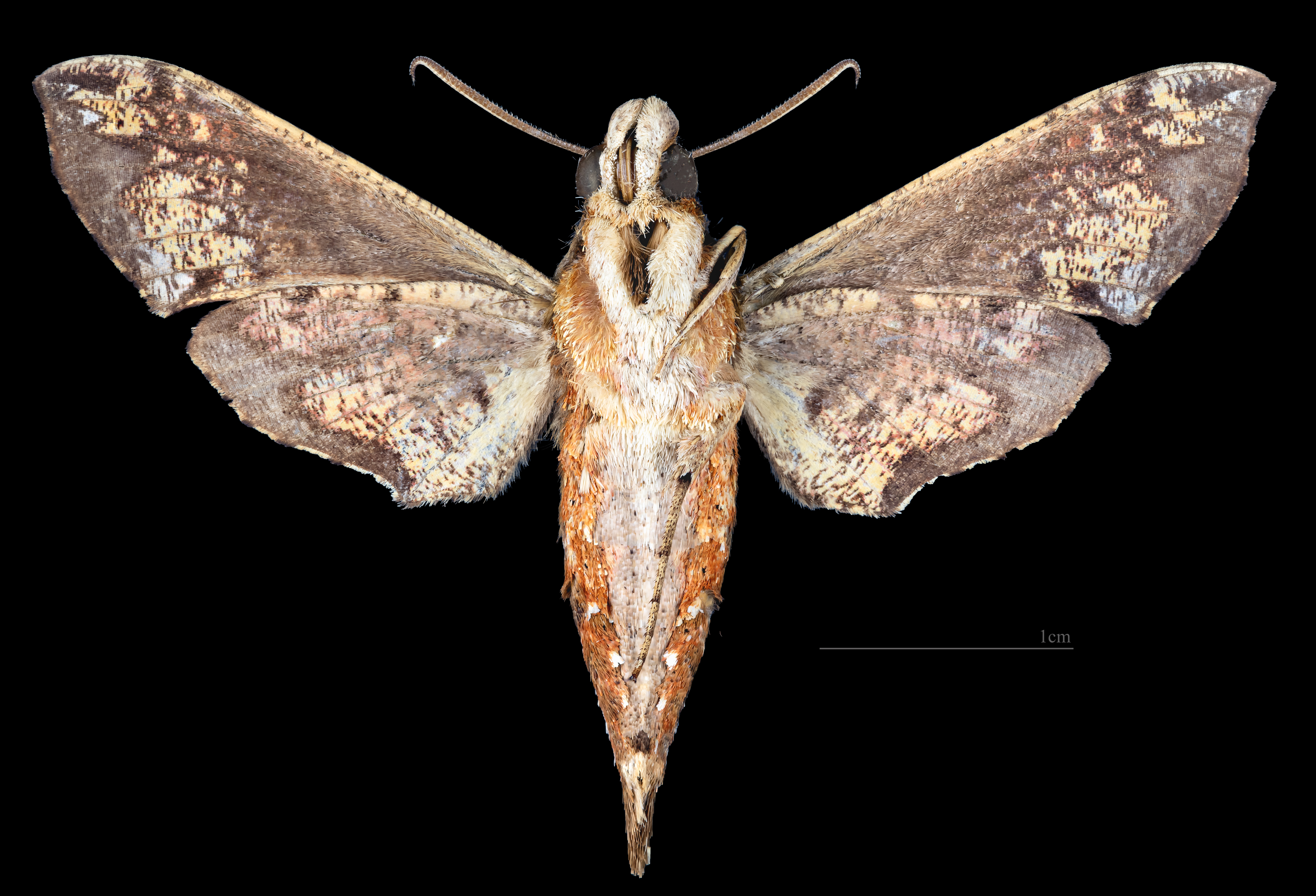
Eupanacra mydon male ventral

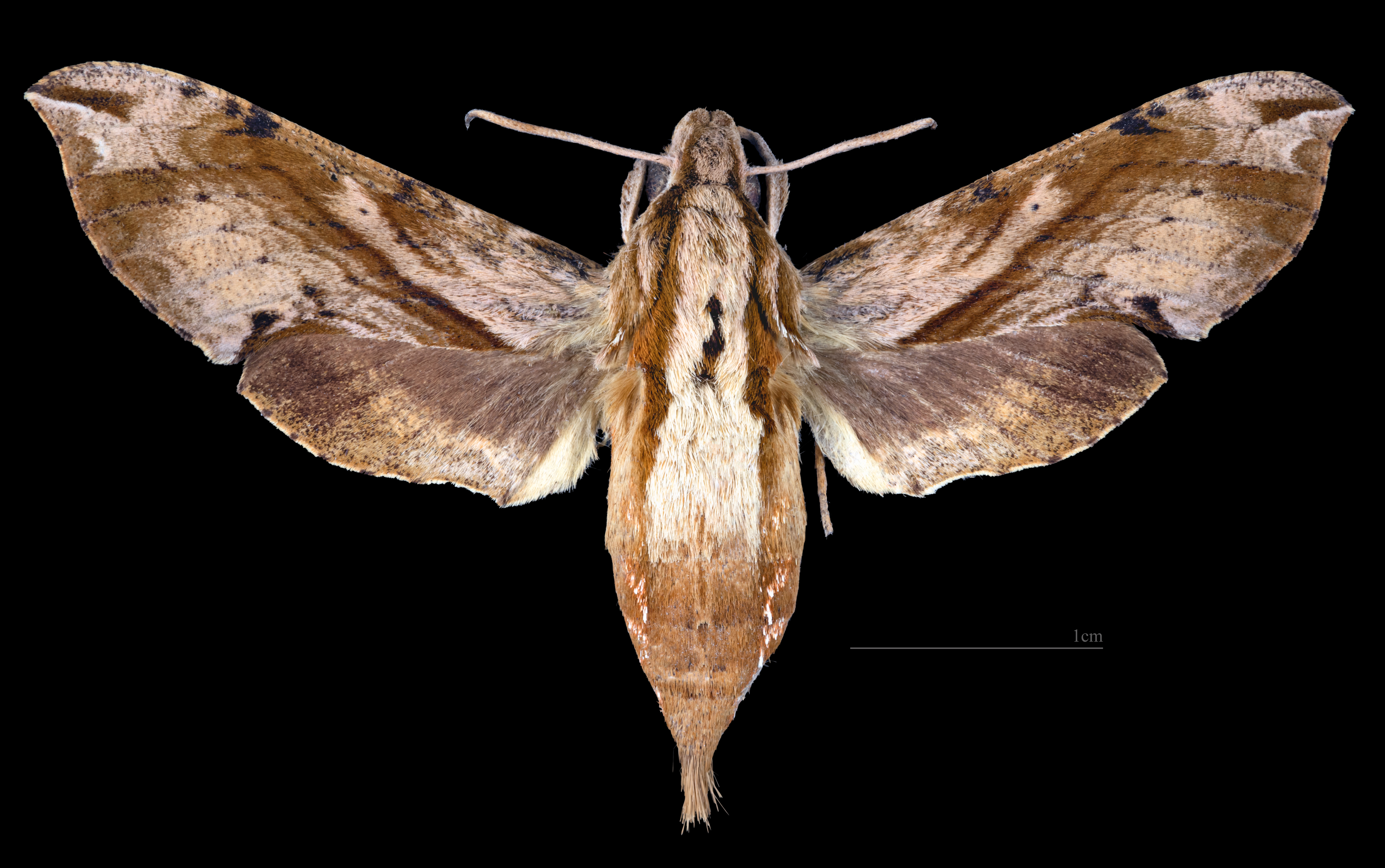
Eupanacra mydon female dorsal

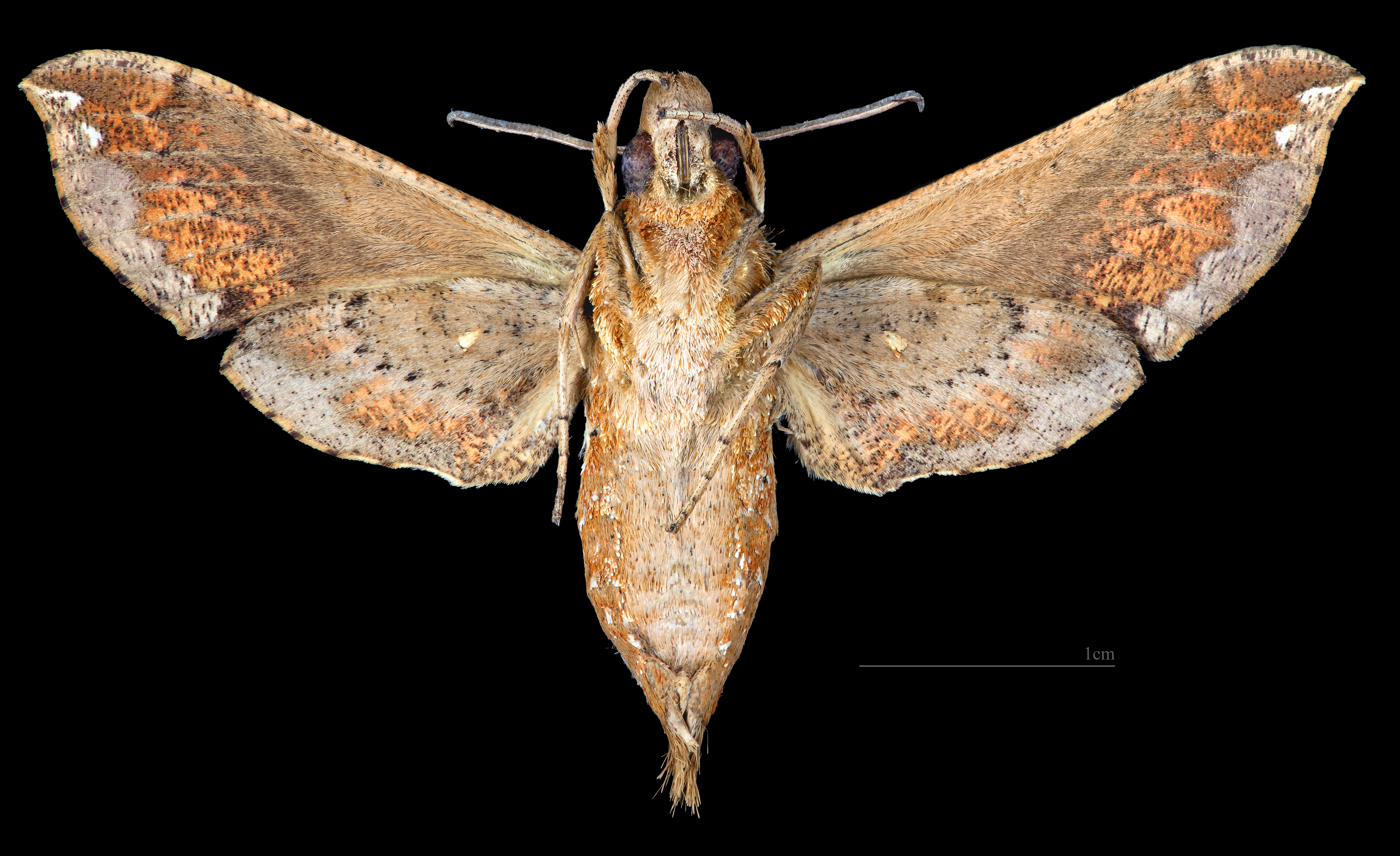
Eupanacra mydon female ventral

== Biology ==
There are multiple generations per year. Adults are on wing from March to late July and again in late September (with peaks in March and May) in Hong Kong. Adults are attracted to the flowers of Duranta erecta and Ixora species.

The larvae have been recorded feeding on Alocasia odora in Hong Kong, Scindapsus pictus, Syngonium podophyllum and Syngonium vellozianum in Laos and Thailand and Colocasia, Caladium, Arisaema and Amorphophallus species elsewhere.
