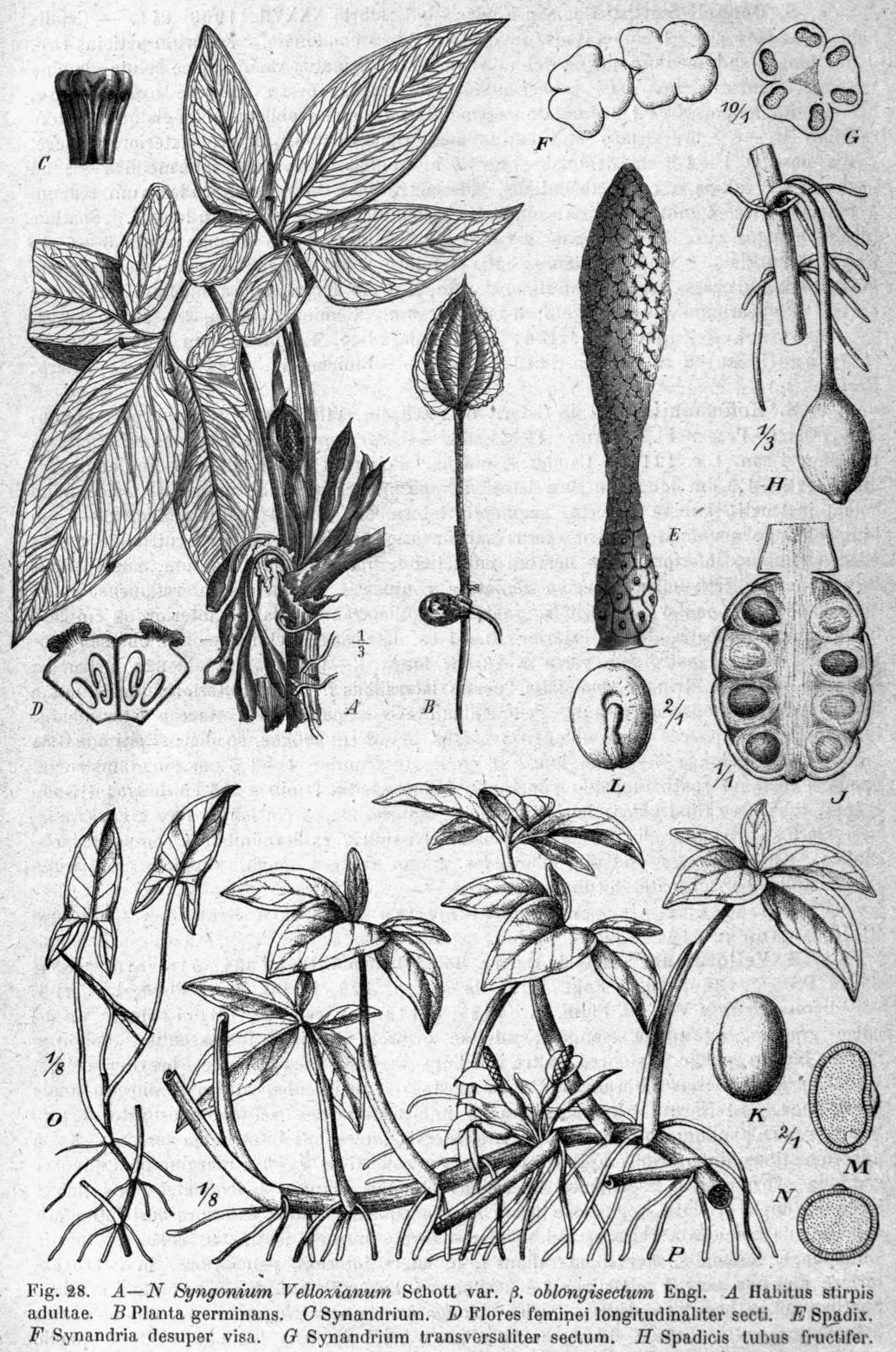
- Syngonium podophyllum var. podophyllum

Scientific classification
- Kingdom: Plantae
- Clade: Tracheophytes
- Clade: Angiosperms
- Clade: Monocots
- Order: Alismatales
- Family: Araceae
- Subfamily: Aroideae
- Tribe: Caladieae
- Genus: Syngonium; Schott

Synonyms
- Porphyrospatha Engl.

= Syngonium =

Genus of flowering plants

Syngonium /sɪŋˈɡoʊniəm/ is a genus of flowering plants in the family Araceae, native to tropical rainforests in southern Mexico, the West Indies, and Central and South America. They are vines growing to heights of 10–20 m or more in trees. Their leaves change shape according to the plant's stage of growth; adult leaf forms are often much more lobed than the juvenile forms usually seen on small house plants. The scientific name of the genus comes from the Greek words σύν (syn - plus, z) and γονή (gone - gonada) and refers to the fused ovaries of female flowers.

== Cultivation ==
Syngonium species are often grown as house plants, usually only in the juvenile foliage stages. They thrive in warm and humid conditions. Syngonium podophyllum is the most commonly cultivated species, and is often referred to simply as Syngonium. They are easy to propagate in water or soil through cuttings that include a node.

== Distribution ==
Syngonium species generally inhabit tropical rainforests, subtropical forests, thickets, urban areas, and wetlands. Invasive species are also troublesome weeds, such as in banana fields.

Syngonium species are native to tropical America, where they are found from Mexico to Brazil. The center of diversity of the genus is in Costa Rica and Panama, where there are 16 species (13 in Costa Rica and 11 in Panama). The second greatest species diversity is in Mexico, with eight species. The most widespread species is S. podophyllum, which ranges from Mexico to Brazil. It is believed that the Mexican and Costa Rican populations of Syngonium have long been separated, which led to morphological differences in the populations of the same species (e.g. S. podophyllum and S. macrophyllum).

Syngonium podophyllum has been introduced as an ornamental groundcover in American Samoa, Australia, Micronesia, French Polynesia, New Caledonia, Niue, Puerto Rico, Singapore, South Africa, Florida, Hawaii, the Bahamas, Easter Island, Rota, Solomon Islands, and on Christmas Island. In each of these locations, it is widespread, invasive and displaces native vegetation. Similarly, S. angustatum is an invasive species on many Pacific islands and the Chagos Archipelago in the Indian Ocean.

== Morphology and anatomy ==
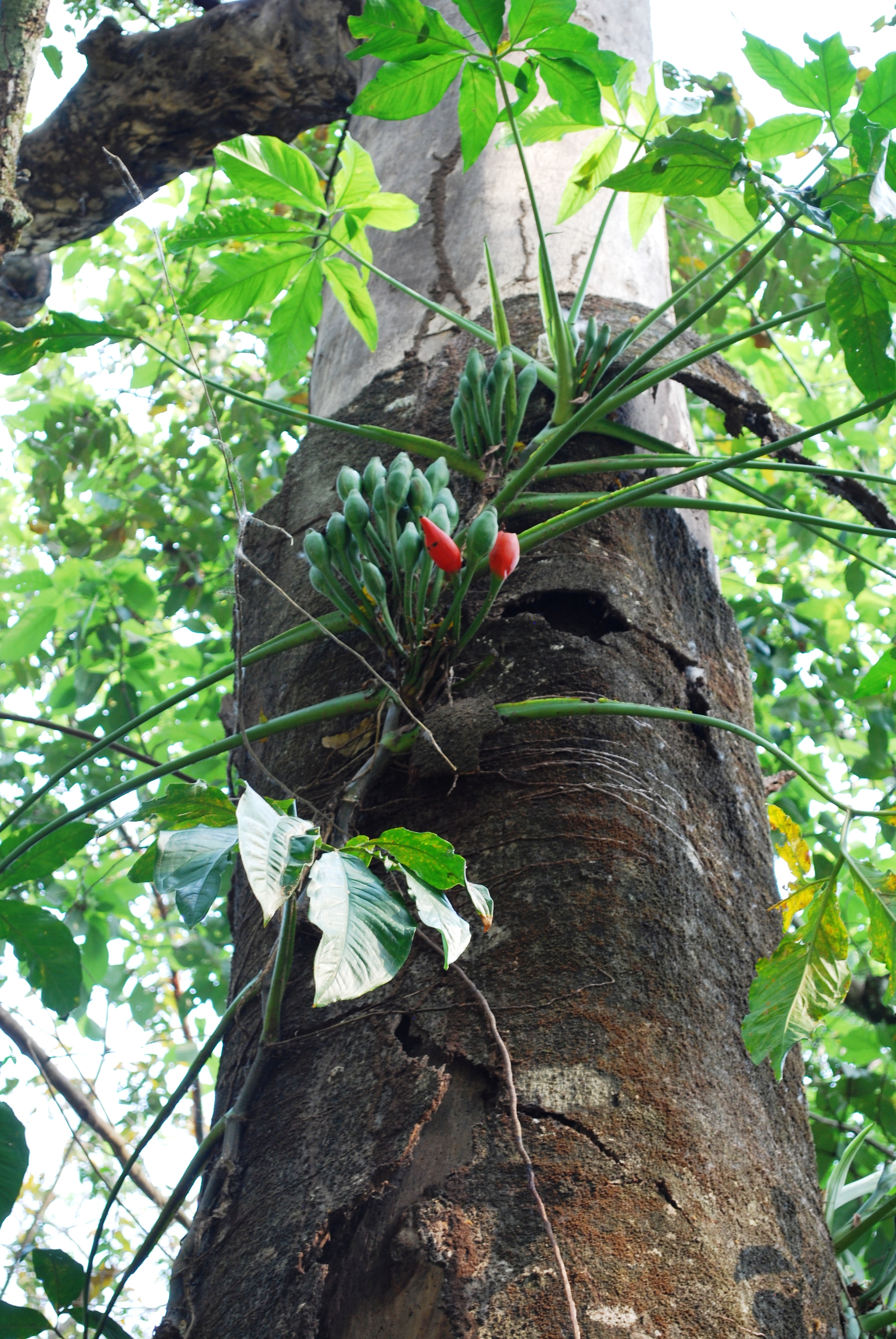
Syngonium plant with fruits climbing a tree in Chiapas, Mexico

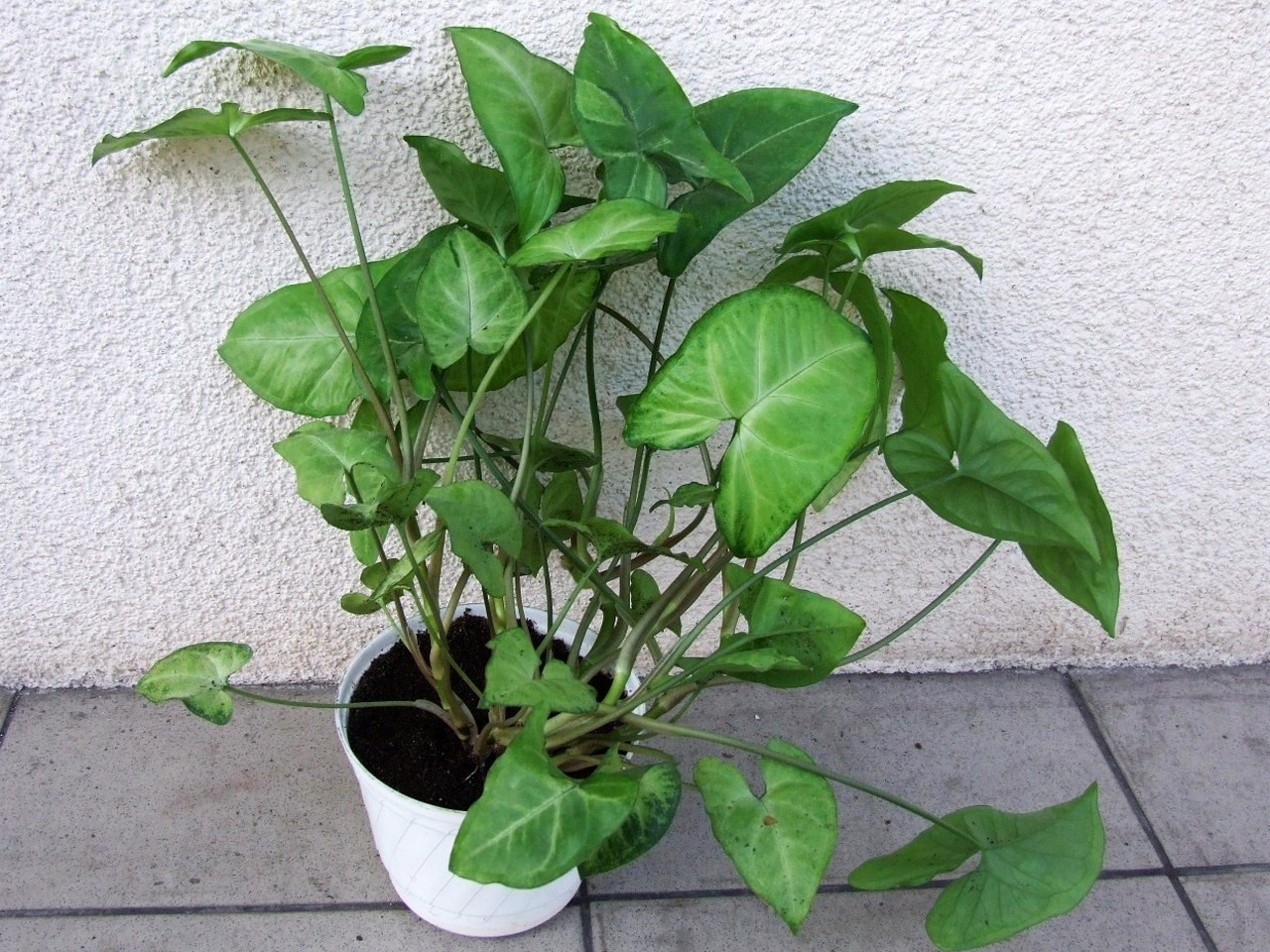
Syngonium podophyllum is a popular houseplant.

Syngonium are elongated, climbing or creeping herbaceous evergreen plants that reach a height of 10–20 m (33–66 ft) with a sympodial growth type, lacking branches (branches form only after damage to the apical meristem), and are cylindrical to oval in cross-section. After the inflorescences have risen from the top of the stem, it stops growing, and from the side bud, placed two nodes below the top of the stem, a new main shoot is formed.

The stem reaches several millimeters in diameter in juvenile plants and up to 6 cm in diameter (average of 1–2 cm) in mature plants. In juvenile plants, the stem is green and performs photosynthesis, but with age the stem loses chlorophyll. The climbing stalks have elongated internodes and are elastic to some extent; however, after bending the stem's skin often breaks and peels off, turning brown or yellowish. In the parenchyma, starch grains are randomly distributed. Stem tissue contains idioblasts with calcium oxalate crystals. The stem also contains secretory cells, containing tannins and sap.

Just below each node there are two types of adventitious roots: a bundle of sticky roots and a single root, whose function is to supply the plant with nutrients.

=== Leaves ===
The genus has been divided into informal groups based on the shape of leaf blades:

- Cordatum - Juvenile leaves whole, ovate or elliptical; mature leaves ovoid-elliptical, oblong-ovate or ovate, less often arrow-shaped and slightly narrowed.
- Oblongatum - Juvenile and mature oblong leaves longitudinal-elliptical or ovoid-elliptic.
- Pinnatilobum - Juvenile egg-shaped leaves, often with a heart-shaped root; mature leaves split, narrowly lobed.
- Syngonium - Juvenile leaves, whole ovate or elliptical; mature bisector leaves up to 11-secant and fan-shaped; the degree of necrosis of mature leaves depends on the age of the leaf and its position on the stem, older leaves and those higher on the stem are more complicated than juvenile and lower leaves. Not fully mature leaves of plants that start climbing are arrow- or spear-shaped.

=== Flowers ===
Plants produce 1 to 11 pedunculate inflorescences.

=== Fruits ===
The fruit is ovoid and compound, surrounded by a spathe, which sometimes breaks and curls up, revealing fruit that is usually brownish and very aromatic (seeds spread by mammals) or white (in S. mauroanum, S. triphyllum and S. wendlandii, seeds spread by birds). Each fruit contains from 50 to 100 seeds, which are usually ovate or cylindrical, 5-10 × 3–6 mm, and with rounded ends. The seed husks are black or brown, thin, and shiny. Seeds lose their ability to germinate after drying.

== Biology and ecology ==
Syngonium are perennial, evergreen climbers and hemieiphytes. Sometimes plants become epiphytes, such as after breaking the stem. After seed germination, which always takes place in the ground, the plant remains for some time at the rosette stage, with a slender stalk with very short internodes. Leaves, first ovate, after some time become cordate at the base. Then the stem rapidly grows to length, creeping in places with the highest shading. After reaching the trunk of the tree, the stem begins to climb rapidly towards the light, and the plant begins to form larger leaf blades. After reaching an appropriate height, the plant forms mature leaf blades and blooms. After the growth cone is damaged, the usually unbranched plant begins to form lateral shoots. In the event of loss of contact with the support by the top part of the stem, the plant begins to produce narrower and longer internodes and smaller leaves.

In the process of flowering plants use the mechanism of thermogenesis. Plants bloom for 3 days. Around noon on the first day of the cycle the scabbard inflorescence opens up to one-half to two-thirds of its length, allowing insects to access the female flowers. The markings of the bars become moist and the temperature of the flask slightly rises above the ambient level. On the morning of the second day of the cycle, the temperature of the flask rapidly increases (to about 12°C above the environment), and the flowers begin to give off a sharp aroma, attracting insects. This condition lasts for about 12 hours, after which the inflorescence temperature drops, but remains at about 2°C above the external conditions. On the third day the temperature of the flask again increases slightly, and the sheath curls up on the stretch of staminodes and female flowers, which stop taking pollen at the same time. Then the male flowers open, letting out long threads of pollen, which fall into the chamber formed by the lower part of the vagina. At the same time, the temperature of the flask drops to the ambient level. Beetles are the primary insects that pollinate the flowers, especially those in the subfamilies Rutelinae and Dynastiniae. Syngonium podophyllum predominantly reproduces vegetatively, contributing to its invasiveness.

== Toxicity ==
All parts of the plant contain sharp crystals of calcium oxalate. This can cause symptoms including gastric irritation, salivation, a tingling, burning, or swelling in the mouth area if ingested. Syngonium plants should be kept away from pets: toxic symptoms in animals including dogs, cats, and horses include oral irritation, mouth area swelling, excessive drooling, or difficulty swallowing.

== Species ==
As of August 2026, Plants of the World Online accepts the following 42 species:

- Syngonium adsettiorum Croat, O.Ortiz & J.S.Harrison
- Syngonium angustatum Schott
- Syngonium armigerum (Standl. & L.O.Williams) Croat
- Syngonium auritum (L.) Schott
- Syngonium bastimentoense O.Ortiz & Croat
- Syngonium brewsterense Croat & Delannay
- Syngonium castroi Grayum
- Syngonium chiapense Matuda
- Syngonium chocoanum Croat
- Syngonium churchillii Croat & O.Ortiz
- Syngonium crassifolium (Engl.) Croat
- Syngonium dodsonianum Croat
- Syngonium erythrophyllum Birdsey ex G.S.Bunting
- Syngonium foreroanum Croat
- Syngonium gentryanum Croat
- Syngonium glaucopetiolatum Croat
- Syngonium hastiferum (Standl. & L.O.Williams) Croat
- Syngonium hastifolium Engl.
- Syngonium hoffmannii Schott
- Syngonium huastecorum Diaz Jim. & Croat
- Syngonium laterinervium Croat
- Syngonium litense Croat
- Syngonium llanoense Croat
- Syngonium macrophyllum Engl.
- Syngonium mauroanum Birdsey ex G.S.Bunting
- Syngonium meridense G.S.Bunting
- Syngonium neglectum Schott
- Syngonium oduberi T.Ray
- Syngonium peliocladum Schott
- Syngonium podophyllum Schott
- Syngonium purpureospathum Croat & Raz
- Syngonium rayi Grayum
- Syngonium sagittatum G.S.Bunting
- Syngonium salvadorense Schott
- Syngonium schottianum H.Wendl. ex Schott
- Syngonium sparreorum Croat
- Syngonium standleyanum G.S.Bunting
- Syngonium steyermarkii Croat
- Syngonium tacotalpense Diaz Jim. & Croat
- Syngonium triphyllum Birdsey ex Croat
- Syngonium wendlandii Schott
- Syngonium yurimaguense Engl.
