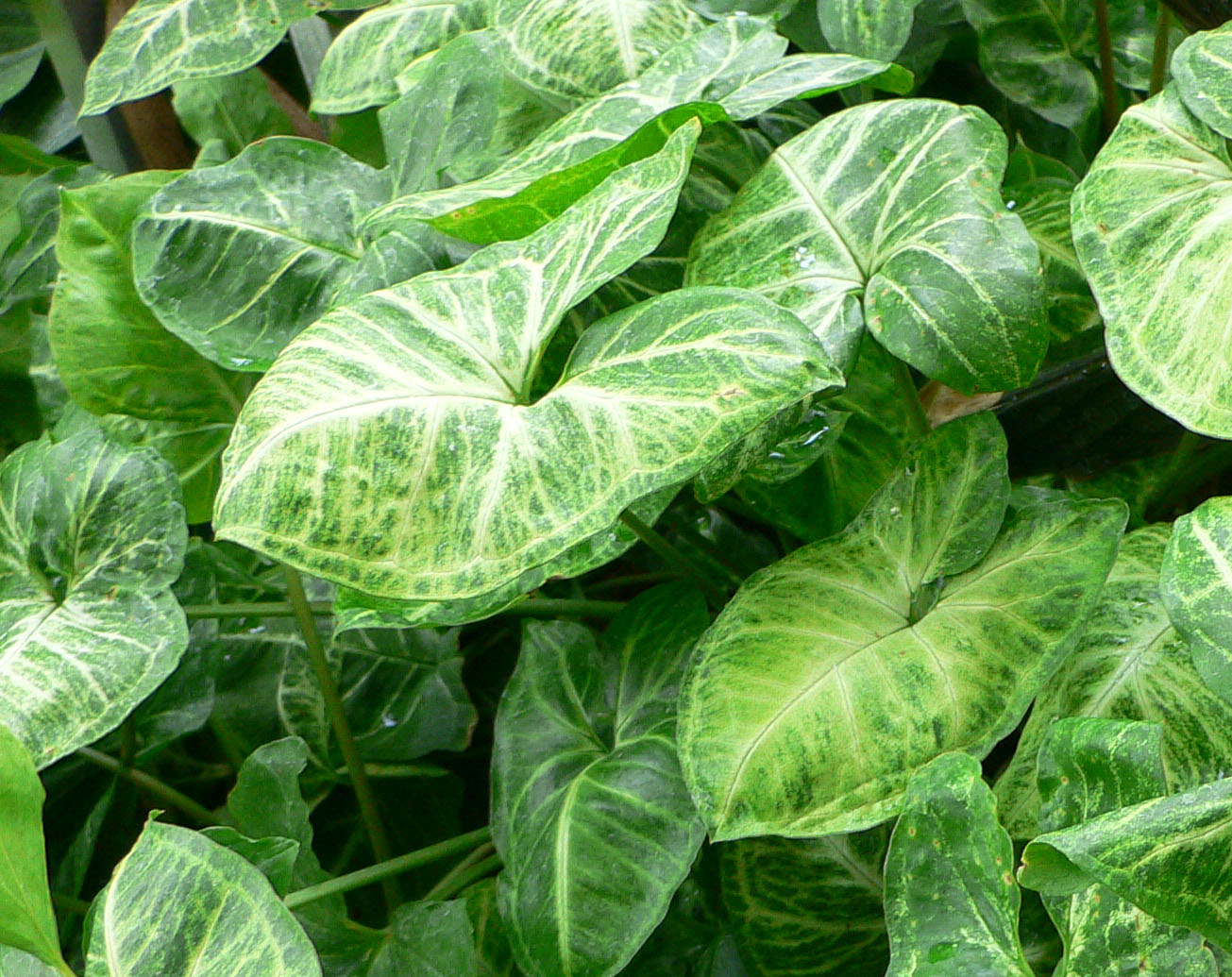
- var. podophyllum

Scientific classification
- Kingdom: Plantae
- Clade: Tracheophytes
- Clade: Angiosperms
- Clade: Monocots
- Order: Alismatales
- Family: Araceae
- Genus: Syngonium
- Species: S. podophyllum

Binomial name
- Syngonium podophyllum Schott

Synonyms
- Synonymy: Syngonium podophyllum var. typicum Engl.; Syngonium peliocladum Schott; Pothos auritus Willd.; Arum auritum Vell. 1831, illegitimate homonym, not L. 1759; Xanthosoma gracile Miq.; Syngonium ruizii Schott; Syngonium vellozoanum Schott; Syngonium affine Schott; Syngonium decipiens Schott; Syngonium gracile (Miq.) Schott; Syngonium poeppigii Schott; Syngonium riedelianum Schott; Syngonium willdenowii Schott; Syngonium xanthophilum Schott; Syngonium amazonicum Engl.; Syngonium ternatum Gleason

= Syngonium podophyllum =

Species of flowering plant

Syngonium podophyllum is a species of aroid that is a popular houseplant. Common names include: arrowhead plant, arrowhead vine, arrowhead philodendron, goosefoot, nephthytis, African evergreen, and American evergreen. The species is native to a wide region of Latin America from Mexico through Bolivia, and naturalized in the West Indies, Florida, Texas, Hawaii, and other places.

== Etymology ==
Syngonium podophyllum is the most commonly cultivated species in the genus Syngonium, and is often referred to simply as syngonium. It was originally confused with the similar-looking African genus Nephthytis, and this is still used as a common name for the plant. It was given its own genus in 1879.

The Latin specific epithet podophyllum means "with foot/feet-like leaves".

== Description ==
It climbs a few meters tall over the trunks of tropical jungle trees, clinging by its roots. The cultivars cultivated indoors reach a height of up to 1.5 m (4.9 ft). During the year, the plant grows about 30 cm (12 in) and produces 6-7 leaves. Its single leaves, usually arrow-shaped, are up to 30 cm (12 in) long. In the wild, the leaves are dark green and without variegation. Cultivated varieties have leaves in various shades of green, often light green and usually with different types of lighter tannins. There are several variegated cultivars, the main differences being in the position and extent of the cream or white markings. Some leaves are almost entirely white, pink or yellow.

Its flowers are small, greenish or whitish on spadices within light-yellow through green spathes. However, the plants grown indoors do not bloom, aside from the older, well-cared-for specimens.

== Cultivation ==
As a vine, it requires some support. It can also be grown as a groundcover plant. The soil should be humus and systematically watered. Varieties with leaves with pink, reddish, or white markings require a well-lit place, though those with dark green leaves can grow in a darker place. The summer temperature should not exceed 38 °C (100 °F). In winter, it should not be lower than 0 °C (32 °F). Preferring moist air, it should be watered 2-3 times a week in summer but much less often in winter.

To ensure adequate humidity, the plant pot should be placed in a larger container with constantly moist peat and sprayed with water daily. Dusty leaves should be wiped clean with a damp cloth. Feed in the summer with a small dose of fertilizers dissolved in water. After a few years of cultivation, the plant becomes unattractive, where its cutting is advisable, and then it will produce new shoots. It should be transplanted only when necessary.

It has gained the Royal Horticultural Society's Award of Garden Merit.

"Syngonium podophyllum can also be grown directly in water (roots submerged 24/7), which it's a perfect candidate for, or in hydroculture (wash roots free of soil and pot up in clay pellets), which helps eliminate all water woes. If you decide to grow in water, keep the water properly oxygenated at all times by changing it often (at least once a week would be terrific)."

=== Propagation ===
The plant can be propagated by cuttings in water, or straight into potting compost. Nonetheless, both methods have a good success rate, providing the right part of the plant is cut. Cuttings using the rooting machine are rooted in a multiplier at a temperature of 18 °C (64 °F). Cuttings from the tops of the shoots are easier to root than cuttings from lower areas of shoots.

== Toxicity ==
All parts of Syngonium podophyllum are poisonous and cause severe mouth pain if eaten. It is not unusual to find these growing in Sub-tropical Florida landscapes, where homeowners and Gardeners need to be aware of the severe skin burning sensations caused by the plants sap containing oxalic acid and the eye damage potential from raphides.

== Varieties ==
Among the wild populations, two varieties are formally recognized:

1. Syngonium podophyllum var. peliocladum (Schott) Croat - Costa Rica, Panama
2. Syngonium podophyllum var. podophyllum - widespread as a native from Mexico to Brazil and Bolivia, as well as Trinidad; naturalized in the West Indies (including the Cayman Islands and the Bahamas), Florida, Texas, Hawaii, Seychelles, Borneo, and Malaysia

== Gallery ==
Syngonium podophyllum

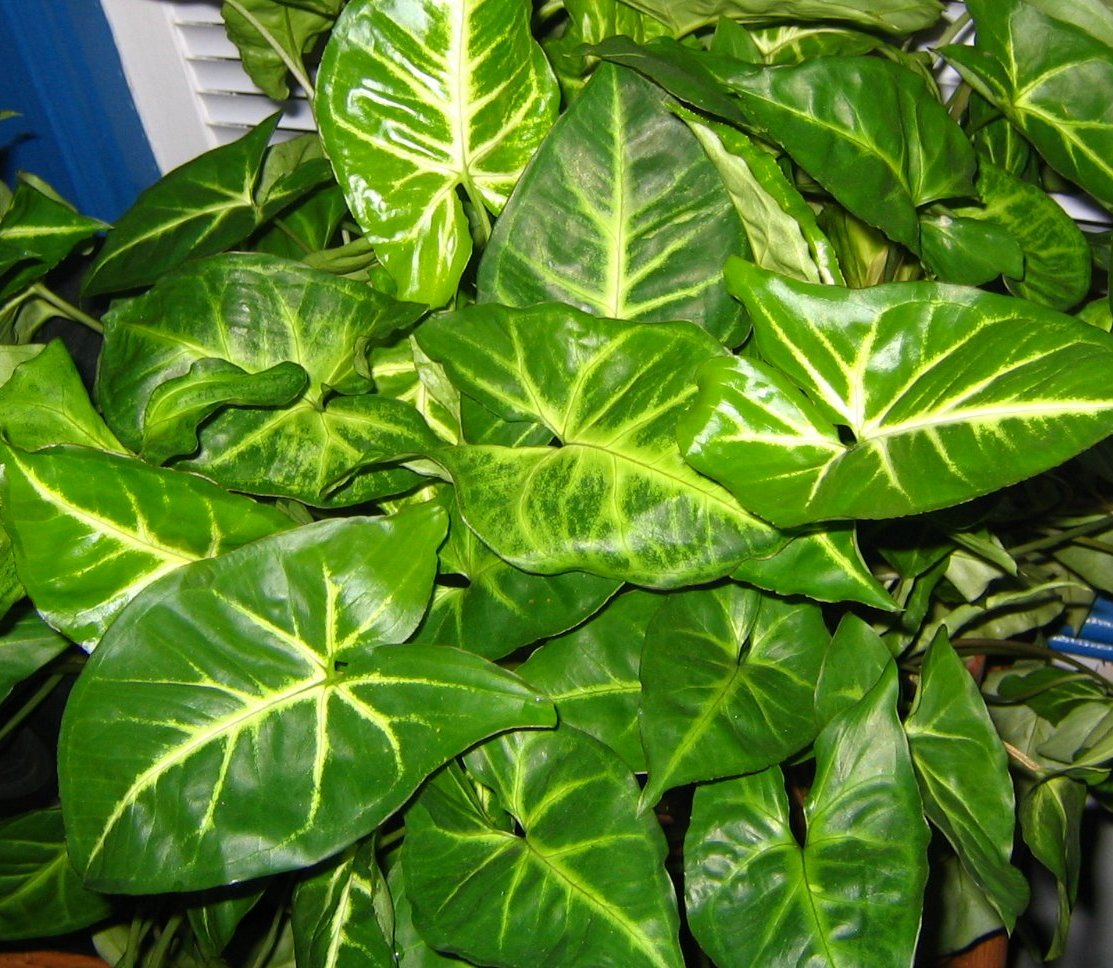
Arrowhead plant, Syngonium podophyllum

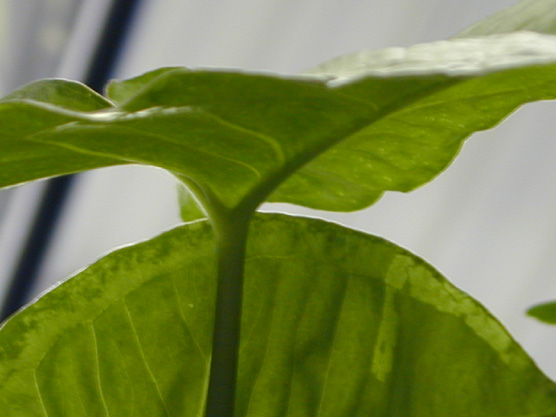
Underside of the Syngonium podophyllum leaf.

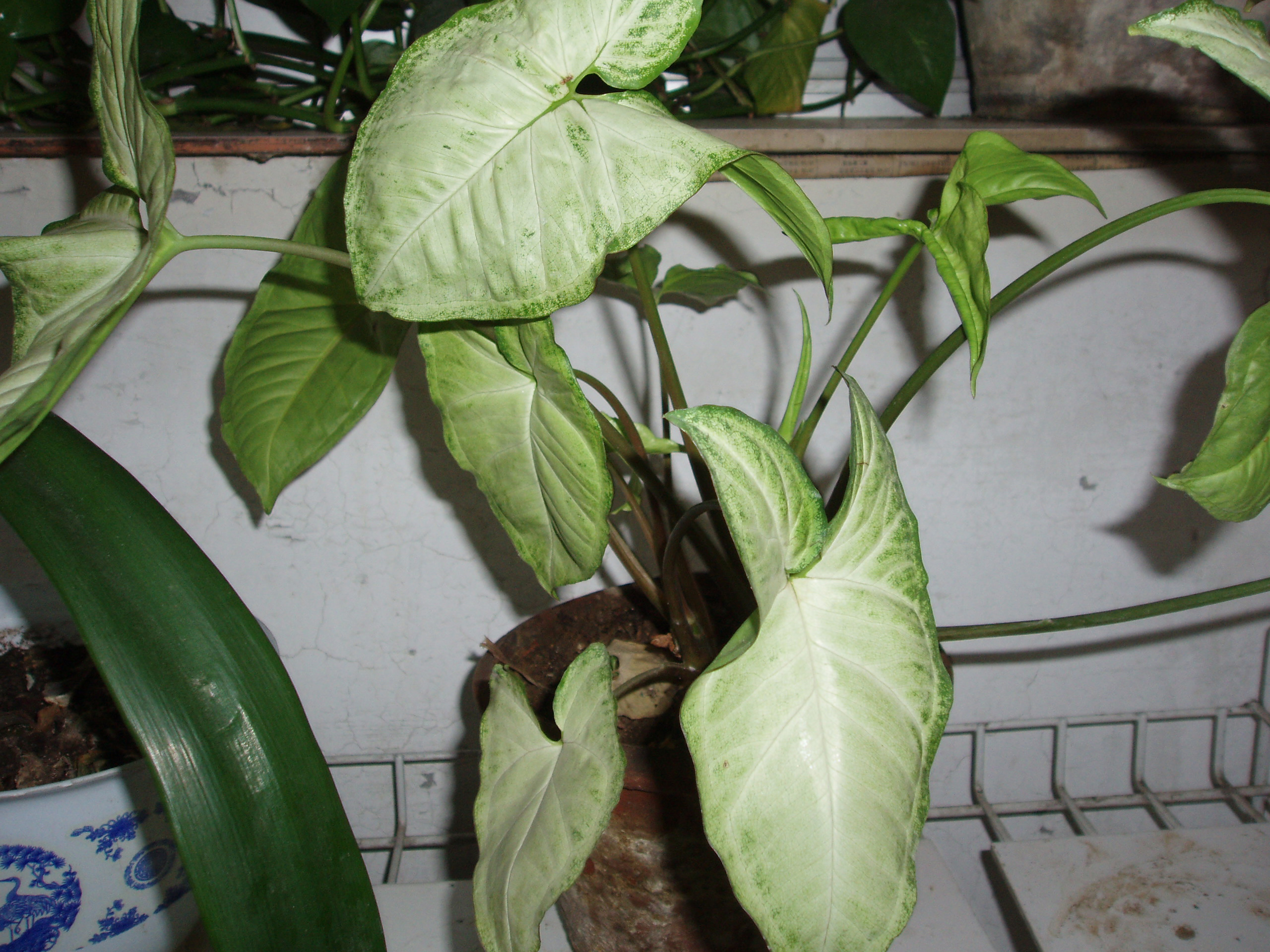
'White Butterfly' cultivar.

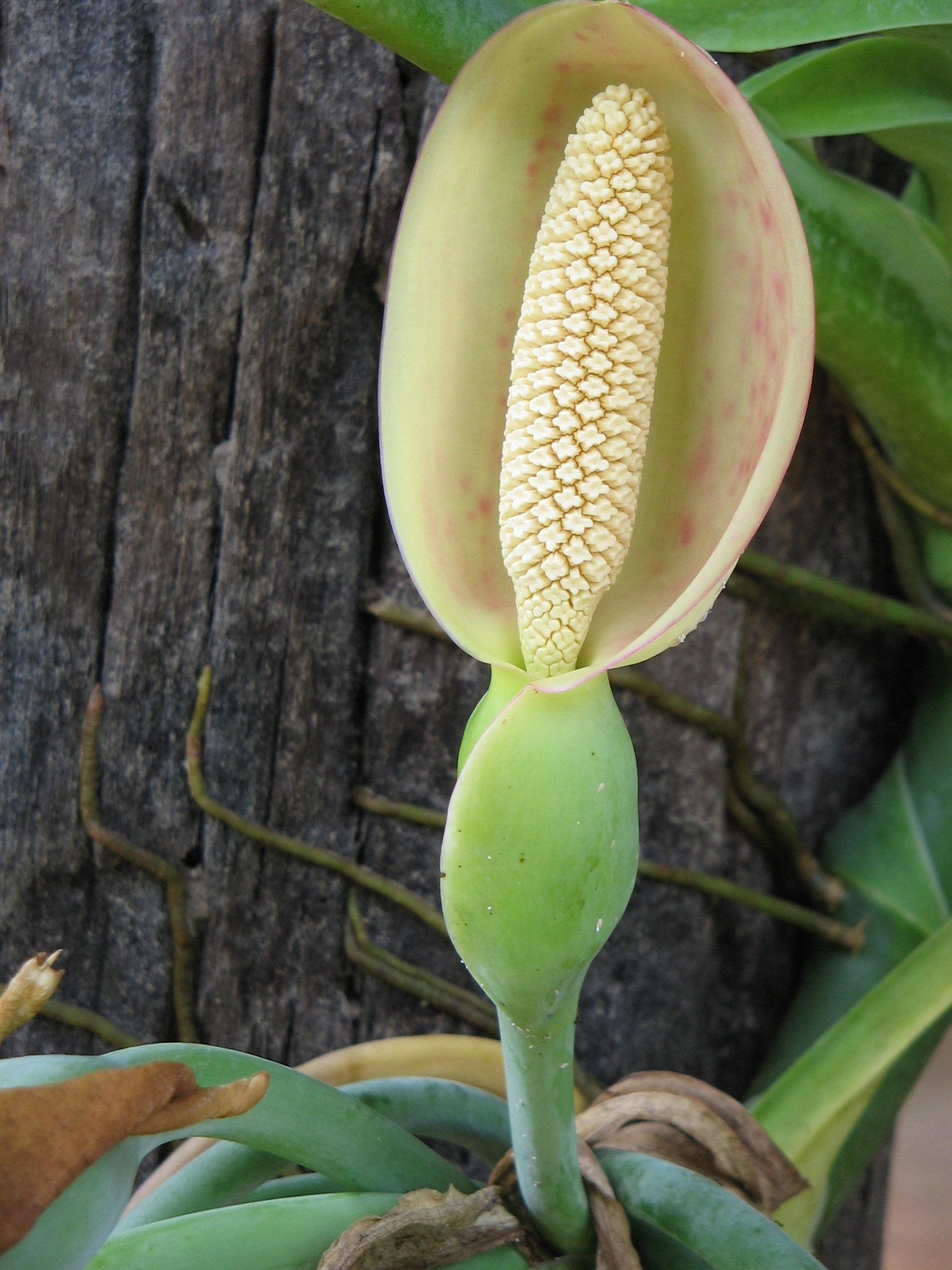
Inflorescence with a spathe and spadix.

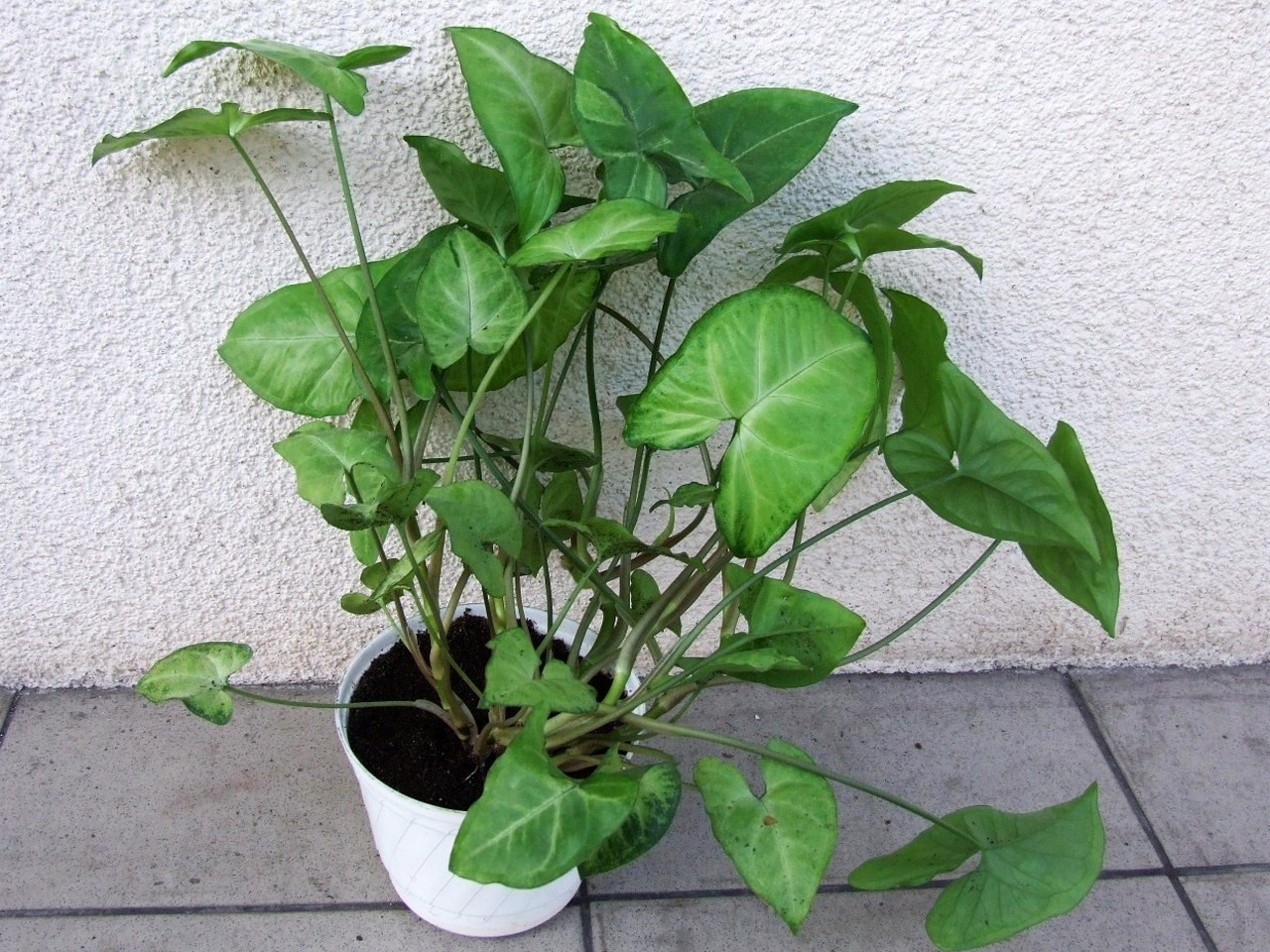
In a pot
