= National Register of Historic Places listings in Winnebago County, Illinois =

Location of Winnebago County in Illinois

This is a list of the National Register of Historic Places listings in Winnebago County, Illinois.

This is intended to be a complete list of the properties and districts on the National Register of Historic Places in Winnebago County, Illinois, United States. Latitude and longitude coordinates are provided for many National Register properties and districts; these locations may be seen together in a map.

There are 43 properties and districts listed on the National Register in the county. Another 2 properties were once listed but have been removed.

This National Park Service list is complete through NPS recent listings posted June 6, 2026.

== Current listings ==
| | Name on the Register | Image | Date listed | Location | City or town | Description |
|---|---|---|---|---|---|---|
| 1 | Barber–Colman Company Historic District | Barber–Colman Company Historic District | August 8, 2006 (#06000674) | 100 Loomis, 1202-1322 (even) Rock Street; 42°15′34″N 89°05′52″W | Rockford | |
| 2 | Beattie Park Mound Group | Beattie Park Mound Group | February 27, 1991 (#91000084) | North Main Street between Park and Mound Avenues; 42°16′28″N 89°05′30″W | Rockford | |
| 3 | William Brown Building | William Brown Building | August 10, 2000 (#00000946) | 226-228 South Main Street; 42°16′10″N 89°05′43″W | Rockford | |
| 4 | Chicago & North Western Railway Stone Arch Bridge | Chicago & North Western Railway Stone Arch Bridge | August 19, 1993 (#93000840) | 0.6 miles (0.97 km) east of Illinois Route 251, 0.6 miles (0.97 km) west of Interstate 90 and 0.2 miles (0.32 km) south of Burr Oak Road; 42°24′57″N 88°59′51″W | Roscoe Township | |
| 5 | Chick House | Chick House | February 7, 1997 (#97000031) | 119-123 South Main Street; 42°16′14″N 89°05′43″W | Rockford | |
| 6 | Christenson-Anderson Farm | | April 6, 2022 (#100007586) | 15813 Anderson Rd. 42°28′52″N 89°22′04″W | Durand vicinity | |
| 7 | Condon Brothers and R. H. Shumway Building | Condon Brothers and R. H. Shumway Building | August 18, 2015 (#15000524) | 624-642 Cedar St. 42°16′11″N 89°06′09″W | Rockford | |
| 8 | Coronado | Coronado | September 6, 1979 (#79000878) | 312-324 North Main Street; 42°16′26″N 89°05′35″W | Rockford | |
| 9 | East Rockford Historic District | East Rockford Historic District | March 20, 1980 (#80001422) | Roughly bounded by Rock River and Market, 4th, and Walnut Streets; 42°16′04″N 89°05′16″W | Rockford | Boundary increase approved December 23, 2015. |
| 10 | Emerson-Keith House | Emerson-Keith House | December 20, 2022 (#100008488) | 420 North Main St. 42°16′29″N 89°05′31″W | Rockford | |
| 11 | Garrison–Coronado–Haskell Historic District | Garrison–Coronado–Haskell Historic District | January 12, 2012 (#11001030) | Roughly bounded by Salem, Summer, Main, Court, Whitman, and Winnebago Sts., and Fisher, Ridge, and North Aves. 42°16′55″N 89°05′10″W | Rockford | |
| 12 | Garrison School | Garrison School | February 9, 2006 (#06000005) | 1105 North Court Street; 42°17′01″N 89°05′09″W | Rockford | |
| 13 | Graham–Ginestra House | Graham–Ginestra House | June 11, 1979 (#79000879) | 1115 South Main Street; 42°15′42″N 89°06′02″W | Rockford | |
| 14 | Greenwood Cemetery Chapel and Crematory | Greenwood Cemetery Chapel and Crematory | August 28, 2012 (#12000554) | 1011 Auburn St. 42°17′25″N 89°04′40″W | Rockford | |
| 15 | Haight Village Historic District | Haight Village Historic District | November 20, 1987 (#87002044) | Roughly bounded by Walnut and Kishwaukee Streets, the Chicago Northwestern railroad tracks, and Madison Street; 42°15′55″N 89°05′22″W | Rockford | |
| 16 | Herrick Cobblestone | Herrick Cobblestone | May 14, 1980 (#80001423) | 2127 Broadway; 42°15′08″N 89°03′44″W | Rockford | |
| 17 | Illinois National Guard Armory | Illinois National Guard Armory | August 10, 2000 (#00000948) | 605 North Main Street; 42°16′37″N 89°05′22″W | Rockford | |
| 18 | Indian Hill Manor and Farm Historic District | Indian Hill Manor and Farm Historic District | June 21, 2001 (#01000667) | 6901-7057 Kishwaukee Road; 42°10′47″N 89°08′06″W | Rockford Township | |
| 19 | Lysander Jacoby House | Lysander Jacoby House | March 5, 1982 (#82002607) | 2 Jacoby Place; 42°17′14″N 89°03′45″W | Rockford | |
| 20 | H.D. Jameson House | H.D. Jameson House | September 14, 2003 (#03000915) | 900 North Prairie Street; 42°27′46″N 89°04′26″W | Rockton | |
| 21 | Lake–Peterson House | Lake–Peterson House | June 25, 1980 (#80001424) | 1313 East State Street; 42°16′01″N 89°04′28″W | Rockford | |
| 22 | Kenneth and Phyllis Laurent House | Kenneth and Phyllis Laurent House | August 28, 2012 (#12000555) | 4646 Spring Brook Rd. 42°17′59″N 89°01′28″W | Rockford | |
| 23 | Charles Lundberg House | Charles Lundberg House | December 30, 2008 (#08001251) | 946 N. 2nd St. 42°16′44″N 89°04′40″W | Rockford | |
| 24 | Macktown Historic District | Macktown Historic District | January 5, 1978 (#78001201) | West of Rockton on the Pecatonica River; 42°27′00″N 89°05′17″W | Rockton | |
| 25 | Peacock Brewery | Peacock Brewery | November 22, 2011 (#11000851) | 200 Prairie and 500 N. Madison Sts. 42°16′23″N 89°05′12″W | Rockford | |
| 26 | William H. Roberts House | William H. Roberts House | September 6, 1979 (#79000877) | 523 Main Street; 42°18′43″N 89°21′35″W | Pecatonica | |
| 27 | Rockford Brass Works | | April 6, 2022 (#100007583) | 700 South Main St. 42°15′55″N 89°05′56″W | Rockford | |
| 28 | Rockford Elk's Lodge #64 | Rockford Elk's Lodge #64 | February 28, 2005 (#05000113) | 210 West Jefferson; 42°16′30″N 89°05′35″W | Rockford | |
| 29 | Rockford Gas Light & Coke Fitting and Meter Shops Building | Rockford Gas Light & Coke Fitting and Meter Shops Building | April 15, 2024 (#100010211) | 915 Cedar Street; 42°16′13″N 89°06′21″W | Rockford | |
| 30 | Rockford Morning Star Building | Rockford Morning Star Building | August 12, 1999 (#99000972) | 127 North Wyman Street; 42°16′18″N 89°05′35″W | Rockford | |
| 31 | Rockford Woman's Club | Rockford Woman's Club | December 31, 2020 (#100005971) | 323 Park Ave. 42°16′29″N 89°05′36″W | Rockford | |
| 32 | Rockton Historic District | Rockton Historic District | May 2, 1978 (#78001202) | Roughly bounded by River, Warren, Cherry, and West Streets; 42°27′11″N 89°04′23″W | Rockton | |
| 33 | St. Thomas Catholic High School for Boys | St. Thomas Catholic High School for Boys | October 4, 2018 (#100002826) | 921 W. State St. 42°16′29″N 89°06′10″W | Rockford | |
| 34 | Seventh Street Commercial Historic District | Seventh Street Commercial Historic District | March 23, 2005 (#04001304) | Roughly bounded by 7th Street, Charles Street, 6th Street, and Keith Creek; 42°15′44″N 89°04′50″W | Rockford | |
| 35 | Soldiers and Sailors Memorial Hall | Soldiers and Sailors Memorial Hall | January 31, 1976 (#76000731) | 211-215 North Main Street; 42°16′21″N 89°05′35″W | Rockford | |
| 36 | Amos Catlin Spafford House | Amos Catlin Spafford House | February 20, 1980 (#80001425) | 501 North Prospect Street; 42°16′21″N 89°03′58″W | Rockford | |
| 37 | Tinker Swiss Cottage | Tinker Swiss Cottage | December 27, 1972 (#72000468) | 411 Kent Street; 42°15′55″N 89°06′07″W | Rockford | |
| 38 | Turner School | Turner School | December 29, 2015 (#15000934) | 1410 Broadway; 42°15′09″N 89°04′29″W | Rockford | |
| 39 | Robert Weber Round Barn | Robert Weber Round Barn | February 23, 1984 (#84001172) | East of Durand; 42°24′44″N 89°14′11″W | Durand | |
| 40 | Valencia Court Apartments | Valencia Court Apartments | December 22, 2009 (#09001123) | 500-518 Fisher Ave. 42°16′46″N 89°05′32″W | Rockford | |
| 41 | West Downtown Rockford Historic District | West Downtown Rockford Historic District | September 5, 2007 (#07000899) | Roughly bounded by Park Avenue, State Street, Church Street, and Wyman Street; 42°16′22″N 89°05′38″W | Rockford | |
| 42 | Witwer House | Witwer House | August 26, 2021 (#100006872) | 504 North 1st St. 42°16′20″N 89°05′08″W | Rockford | |
| 43 | Ziock Building | Ziock Building | May 4, 2011 (#11000246) | 416 S. Main St. 42°16′04″N 89°05′48″W | Rockford | |

== Former listings ==
| | Name on the Register | Image | Date listed | Date removed | Location | City or town | Description |
|---|---|---|---|---|---|---|---|
| 1 | The Limestones | | August 22, 1986 (#86001491) | December 8, 1995 | 118-122 S. Main | Rockford | |
| 2 | Svea Music Hall | Svea Music Hall | March 19, 1982 (#82002608) | December 8, 1995 | 326 7th St. | Rockford | |

== See also ==
- List of National Historic Landmarks in Illinois
- National Register of Historic Places listings in Illinois
