= List of City of Rockford Landmarks and Historic-Districts =

List of local historic sites in Rockford, Illinois

Historic Landmarks and Districts is a designation of the City of Rockford Historic Preservation Commission (RHPC). Many of these landmarks are also listed on the National Register of Historic Places.

== Historic Preservation Commission ==
The City of Rockford's Historic Preservation Commission (RHPC) approves new historic districts and landmarks.

=== Criteria ===
To submit a landmark or district for historic designation, applicants must describe how the proposed landmark meets the criteria.

To be a Rockford landmark, a building, structure, site or object must retain the integrity and spirit of its original design. In addition to this basic requirement, proposed landmark properties must also meet at least one of the following criteria:

1. The building, structure or object predates 1860; or
2. It is an exceptional example of a historic or vernacular style, or one of the few remaining in the City; or
3. It is an extraordinary curiosity or picturesque work; or
4. It is the work of a nationally famous architect; or
5. It is an outstanding or the only known example of work by a locally well known architect or master builder; or
6. It has known historic significance because it is the property most closely associated with the life or activities of a major historic person, organization or group (including ethnic groups); or
7. It has known historic significance because it is the property most associated with a notable historic event; or
8. It is of a type or is associated with a use once common but now rare; or
9. It has yielded, or may be likely to yield, information important in prehistory or history; or
10. By virtue of its location or activities held there, it is a current or former focal point of life in the City.

== List of landmarks ==
=== Individual landmarks ===
Landmark Name	Image	Location	Built	NRHP date
Graham-Ginestra House		1115 South Main Street	1857	June 11, 1979
Herrick-Logli Cobblestone House		2127 Broadway	1847	May 14, 1980
Lake-Peterson House		1313 East State Street	1873	June 25, 1980
Coronado Theatre		314 North Main Street	1927	September 6, 1979
Freeman School		910 Second Avenue	1893	
Midway Theatre		721 East State Street	1918	
Anderson Building		803 North Church Street		
Tinker Swiss Cottage Museum		411 Kent Street	1869	December 27, 1972
Burpee Museum of Natural History		737 & 813 North Main Street		
John Erlander Home		404 South Third Street	1871	
Times Theatre		222-230 North Main Street	1938	
7th Street Train Depot		701-703 7th Street	1911	
Four Squires Building		203 West State Street		
West Middle School		1900 North Rockton Avenue	1939	
East High School		2929 Charles Street	1939	
Garrison School		1105 North Court Street	1887	February 9, 2006
Liebling Building		330 North Main Street	1930	
Shumway Market Building		713 East State Street	1920s	
Illinois National Guard Armory		605 North Main Street	1937	
Rockford City Hall		425 East State Street	1926	
Winnebago County Courthouse Annex		403 Elm Street	1916-1917	
Chick House		119-123 South Main Street	1857	February 7, 1997
Elks Club Building		210 West Jefferson Street	1912	
Abraham Lincoln Junior High School		1500 Charles Street	1925-1927	
Beyer Stadium Ticket Gatehouse		311 15th Avenue		
Booker Washington Center		524 Kent Street and 1005 South Court Street	1858	
Witwer (Bell) House		504 North First Street	1876	August 26, 2021

=== Historic Districts ===
==== National Historic Districts ====
- East Rockford
- Haight Village
- 7th Street Commercial
- Barber-Colman Company
- West Downtown Rockford
- Garrison-Coronado-Haskell

==== Local Historic Districts ====
- Haight Village. Area bounded by South Madison, Walnut and Kishwaukee Streets and the Union Pacific Railroad to the south.
- Garfield Avenue. 600 through 900 blocks of Garfield Avenue.
- Indian Terrace. Indian Terrace south of the Armory, and including Beattie Park.
- Brown's Hills/Knightsville. This is most of the area lying between North Second Street on the west, Sinnissippi Park/Golf Course on the north, the Scandinavian Cemetery (Prospect Street) on the east and Rural Street on the south plus the four houses just north of the YMCA on the west side of North Second Street
- Northeast State & Main. 201, 203 and 211 West State Street, plus 107 and 109 North Main Street.
- Peacock Brewery. 200 Prairie Street plus Brewmaster's House (stone house) at Northwest corner of Prairie and Madison Streets.

== See also ==
- National Register of Historic Places listings in Winnebago County, Illinois
