= Turner School =

Turner School may refer to:

- Enoch Turner School, a historic site and museum in Toronto, Ontario, Canada
- J. Milton Turner School, a historic former school building in Kirkwood, Missouri, U.S.
- Turner Normal and Industrial School, also known as Turner Industrial School, Turner Normal School, and Turner College, in Shelbyville, Tennessee, U.S.
- Turner School (Rockford, Illinois), U.S., a historic school building

== See also ==
- Turner High School (disambiguation)
