= Amerock =

American kitchen goods manufacturer

Amerock, originally the Aldeen Company and later the American Cabinet Hardware Corporation, is an American manufacturer of kitchen goods, primarily those related to kitchen cabinetry. It is now part of The Piedmont Hardware Group, headquartered in Mooresville, North Carolina.

== History ==
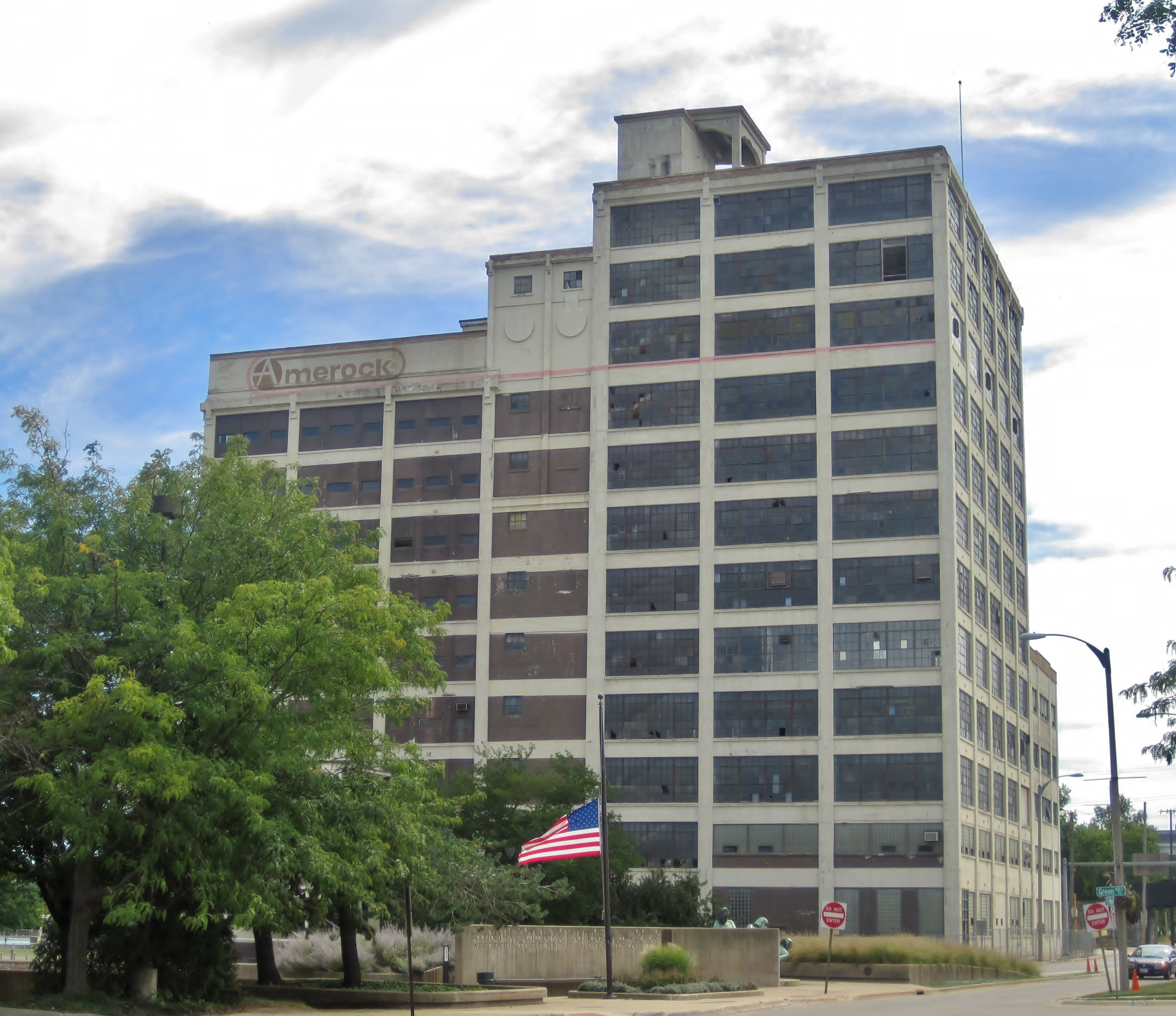
Longtime Amerock headquarters in Rockford, Illinois

Gedor and Ruben Aldeen came from Sweden in 1907 and founded the Aldeen Company in Rockford, Illinois in 1928. In the 1930s, they changed their name to the American Cabinet Hardware Corporation. In 1940, after years of sustained success despite overall economic hardship, the company combined the words Rockford and American to become Amerock, and used the name in their branding. In 1946, they purchased the Ziock Building and operated on all thirteen floors. The company built a six-story addition to the building in 1950.

By the 1950s, American Cabinet struggled to provide enough parking for employees in the downtown location. This prompted the company to build a new building in 1953. The company sold the building to L. C. Miller & Associates and continued to use space there until 1956. The company officially changed its name to Amerock upon moving out that year. However, a few years later, they repurchased the old building for storage space.

By 1977, Amerock had 70% of the national market share for retail kitchen products. However, the company could not survive foreign competition in the 1980s. Newell Rubbermaid purchased Amerock in 1987. The last company operations in Rockford closed in the 2000s following relocation to Columbia, Maryland and Huntersville, North Carolina.
