= Turner High School =

Turner High School may refer to:

- F. J. Turner High School in Beloit, Wisconsin, U.S.
- Henry McNeal Turner High School in Atlanta, Georgia, U.S.
- R. L. Turner High School in Carrollton, Texas, U.S. (Dallas-Fort Worth area)
- Robert Turner College and Career High School in Pearland, Texas, U.S. (Houston area)
- Turner High School (Kansas) in Kansas City, Kansas, U.S.

== See also ==
- Turner School (disambiguation)
