= Beyer Stadium =

Coordinates: 42°15′01″N 89°05′41″W

- Kishwaukee Park; Rockford Base Ball Park; Rockford Municipal Stadium; 15th Avenue Stadium; 15th Avenue Park; Rox Park
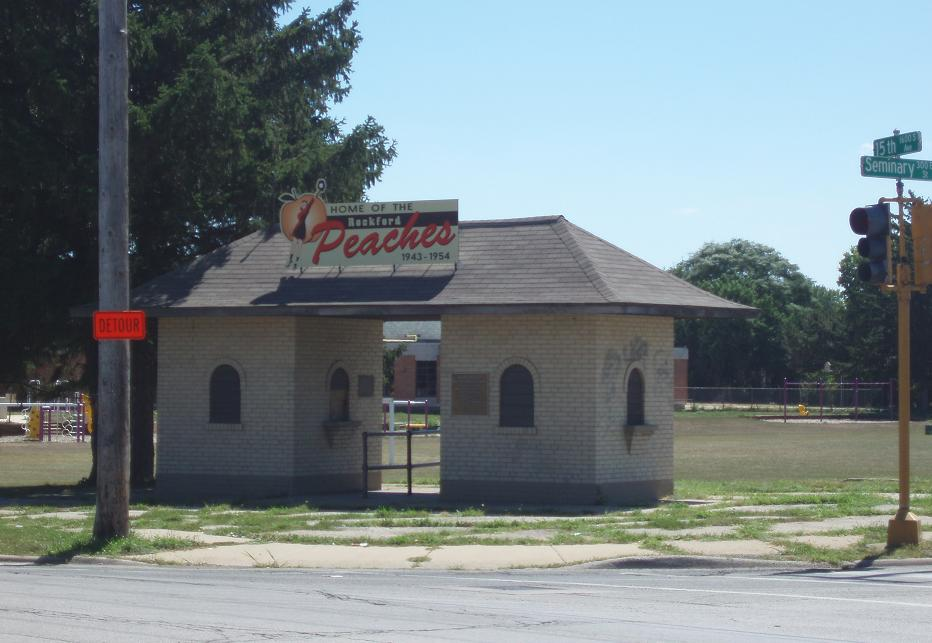
- A ticket booth in front of the Peaches' stadium.
- Interactive map of Beyer Stadium
- Type: Baseball stadium
- Location: 311 15th Avenue
- Nearest city: Rockford, Illinois

History
- Founded: 1913

Site notes
- Restored: 2004

The Beyer Stadium, one mile from downtown in Rockford, Illinois, was the home of the All-American Girls Professional Baseball League's Rockford Peaches from 1943 to 1954.

== History ==
It was a multi-purpose facility, as contemporary newspaper articles also report high school baseball and football games being played there. Its address in city directories was typically given as 311 15th Avenue.

It began as Kishwaukee Park or simply Rockford Base Ball Park in about 1913 when the Rockford club of the Wisconsin-Illinois League moved into it from their previous home, Riverside Park. That club folded after the 1923 season and sold the ballpark to Rockford High School for use as their athletic field. By 1925 the venue was being called Rockford Municipal Stadium or 15th Avenue Stadium. In 1948 it was renamed in honor of Charles Beyer, long-time high school athletics coach.

There was a "practice field" adjacent to the main stadium, to the east. When the Rockford Rox minor league club was established in 1947, the Rockford school board gave them permission to configure the field for baseball, fitting it with lights and seating. To distinguish the field from the Peaches' diamond, it was called 15th Avenue Park or Rox Park. The clubs worked out their schedules so they would not both be playing at the same time, thus avoiding potential logistical problems. The Rox struggled financially, and in early August 1949 they became strictly a road team as they finished out their final season. The site of Rox Field is now occupied by the Beyer Early Child Center and parking lots.

Following the closure of the AAGPBL and hence the Rockford Peaches, the stadium continued to be used for local sports, but was eventually abandoned and fell into disrepair. The stands were torn down in the early 1990s.

== Renovation ==
The film A League of Their Own raised renewed interest in the women's league, and revival of the ballpark was discussed. In 2004, the Rockford Park District finally approved a proposal to revamp Beyer Park. Proposed improvements include a new baseball diamond, new lighting, and a track.

The brick ticket booth was designated a city historic landmark in 2004.

A re-dedication of Beyer Stadium occurred on Saturday, June 5, 2010, at 1:00 pm. The history of Beyer Stadium was celebrated as Rockford's "field of dreams" for over 70 years, and members of the Rockford Peaches women's baseball team were honored, along with other women who played in the All-American Girls Professional Baseball League. To commemorate this event, the Friends of Beyer Stadium and other donors have re-created the original score board, created a vintage backstop, and installed a flag pole that features the Rockford Peaches flag.

The revamped ballpark is bounded by 15th Avenue (north, left field); Seminary Street (west, third base); Beyer Early Childhood Center (east, right field); and various buildings to the south. The ticket booth is at 15th and Seminary, near the left field corner.

https://www.rrstar.com/photogallery/IR/20100606/PHOTOGALLERY/306069893/PH/1/%E2%80%9D//www.googletagmanager.com/ns.html?id=GTM-WF5MZJ9%E2%80%B3
