= Kenneth and Phyllis Laurent House =

Historic house in Illinois, United States

- U.S. National Register of Historic Places
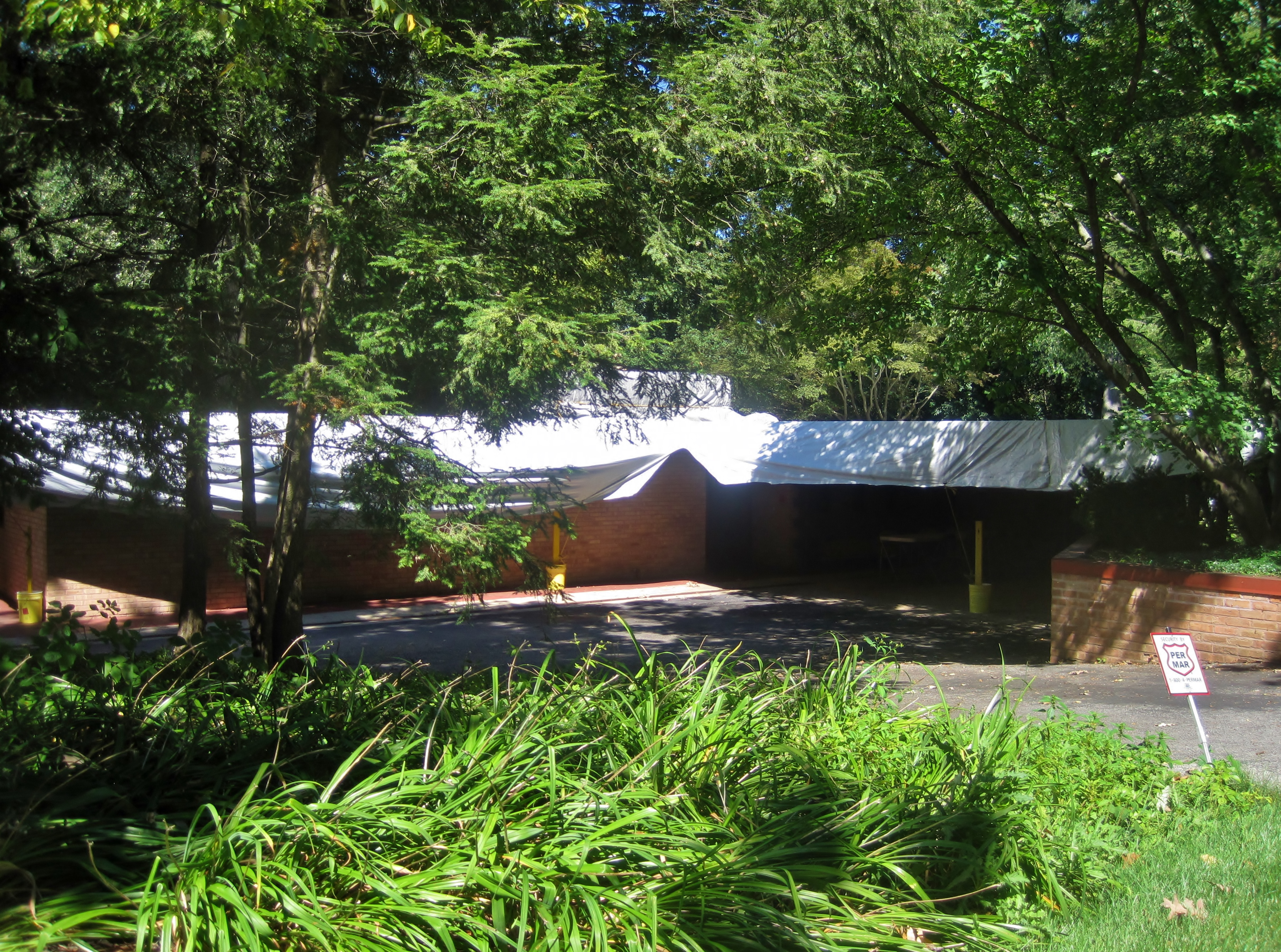
- The Laurent House in 2013, shortly after a storm damaged the roof

- Location within Illinois Location within the United States
- Interactive map showing the location of Kenneth and Phyllis Laurent House
- Location: 4646 Spring Brook Rd Rockford, Illinois
- Coordinates: 42°17′59″N 89°1′28″W
- Built: 1951
- Architect: Frank Lloyd Wright
- Architectural style: Usonian
- NRHP reference No.: 12000555
- Added to NRHP: August 28, 2012

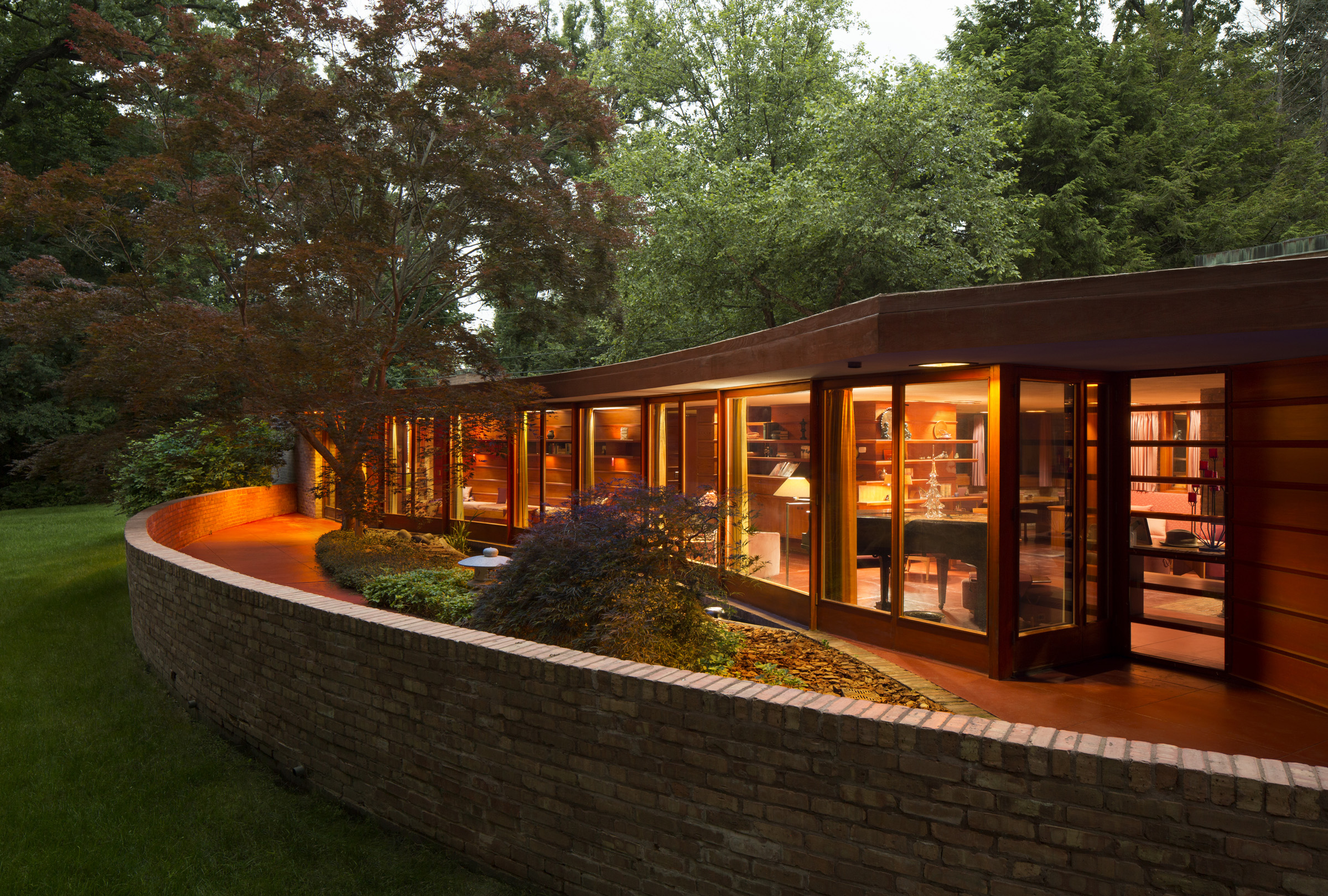
View of the back of the Laurent House and patio with koi pond. The FLW designed lighting gives the house a unique glow at twilight.

The Kenneth and Phyllis Laurent House is a Frank Lloyd Wright-designed Usonian house in Rockford, Illinois. It was the only house that Wright designed for a physically disabled client.

== History ==
Kenneth Laurent was born in Illinois in 1919. In 1937, he moved to Rockford and began working as a statistician for the National Lock Corporation. It was in Rockford where he met his wife, Phyllis Carman. Kenneth Laurent served with the U.S. Navy during World War II, returning to Rockford on March 17, 1946. However, after only a few months, he began exhibiting severe pain in his midsection and lost the feeling in his legs. He was diagnosed with a spinal tumor that May, and though an operation successfully removed the tumor, he was rendered paralyzed. After rehabilitation at the Edward Hines Jr. Veterans Administration Hospital, he received compensation as part of the Specially Adapted Housing program. This program granted disabled veterans 50% of costs for a house to accommodate their disability. This provided an excellent opportunity for the Laurents to purchase their first home.

Phyllis read an article in a summer issue of House Beautiful, which featured the article "The Love Affair of a Man and his House." The article was a review of Frank Lloyd Wright's Loren Pope Residence in Falls Church, Virginia, which was built for the author. Kenneth wrote to Wright in August 1948, suggesting that he design a house on an urban lot that the Laurents had selected. The Laurents were invited to Taliesin in Spring Green, Wisconsin to discuss the project. Wright disliked the lot that the Laurents had suggested and urged his clients to pick a site on the fringes of the city. The Laurents listened to Wright's request, and found a pleasant lot up against a creek. Wright approved the site and began his design in January 1949. The final plans were completed that August. The design was unusual for Wright because it had to be wheelchair-accessible. It is the only house that Wright designed for a person with a disability.

The house was built by local contractor Harry V. Johnson. The Rinehimer Manufacturing Company provided red tidewater cypress for the interior walls and exterior trim. John deKoven Hill was appointed by Wright to oversee the project. During construction, the Laurents befriended Wright. Wright would occasionally ask the Laurents to review some of his current designs at Taliesin. Wright also visited the Laurents, stopping by the house with Hill and Edgar Kaufmann Jr. In 1958, the Laurents again turned to Wright when they wanted an addition to their house. The Laurents did not like the first set of designs Wright made, and Wright died before he was able to draft a second. The addition was designed in 1960 by Evanston architect John H. "Jack" Howe, a former Wright apprentice. The son of Harry Johnson was commissioned to build the addition. The Laurents were the only family to ever live in the house. On August 28, 2012, it was recognized by the National Park Service with a listing on the National Register of Historic Places. It was expected to open for tours in the summer of 2013, but a storm damaged the roof; the Laurent House Foundation committed itself to raising $500,000 to repair it, and tours began on June 8, 2014.

== Architecture ==
The house is a hemicycle design, measuring approximately 2,600 square feet (240 m^{2}) on a 1.3-acre (0.53 ha) lot. The Laurent House was Wright's first single-story building to use this design. The lot gently slopes toward the Spring Creek. It is primarily built with red tidewater cypress and Chicago common brick; plans originally called for limestone, but the Laurents rejected the additional cost. It is built on a poured concrete foundation set on crushed rock; the top layer of concrete was mixed with a red pigment. The house features two large chimneys. The central chimney is above the roofline with a wide copper drip edge. The other chimney is on the end wall of the east side of the master bedroom. The roof is flat and is made of tar and gravel. The house has deep eaves and a wide fascia. Recessed square lightboxes are found intermittently along the eaves. All windows have cypress frames and are single light. The main entrance is underneath a two-car carport. A 50-foot (15 m) curved wall of glass faces the northwest. The house has radiant heat from water pipes. The only sub-grade area of the house is a small maintenance room where devices such as the water heater and water softener are located. The bathrooms are larger than in most Wright designs for improved maneuverability.

== See also ==
- List of Frank Lloyd Wright works
- National Register of Historic Places listings in Winnebago County, Illinois
