= Valencia Court Apartments =

- U.S. National Register of Historic Places
- U.S. Historic district – Contributing property
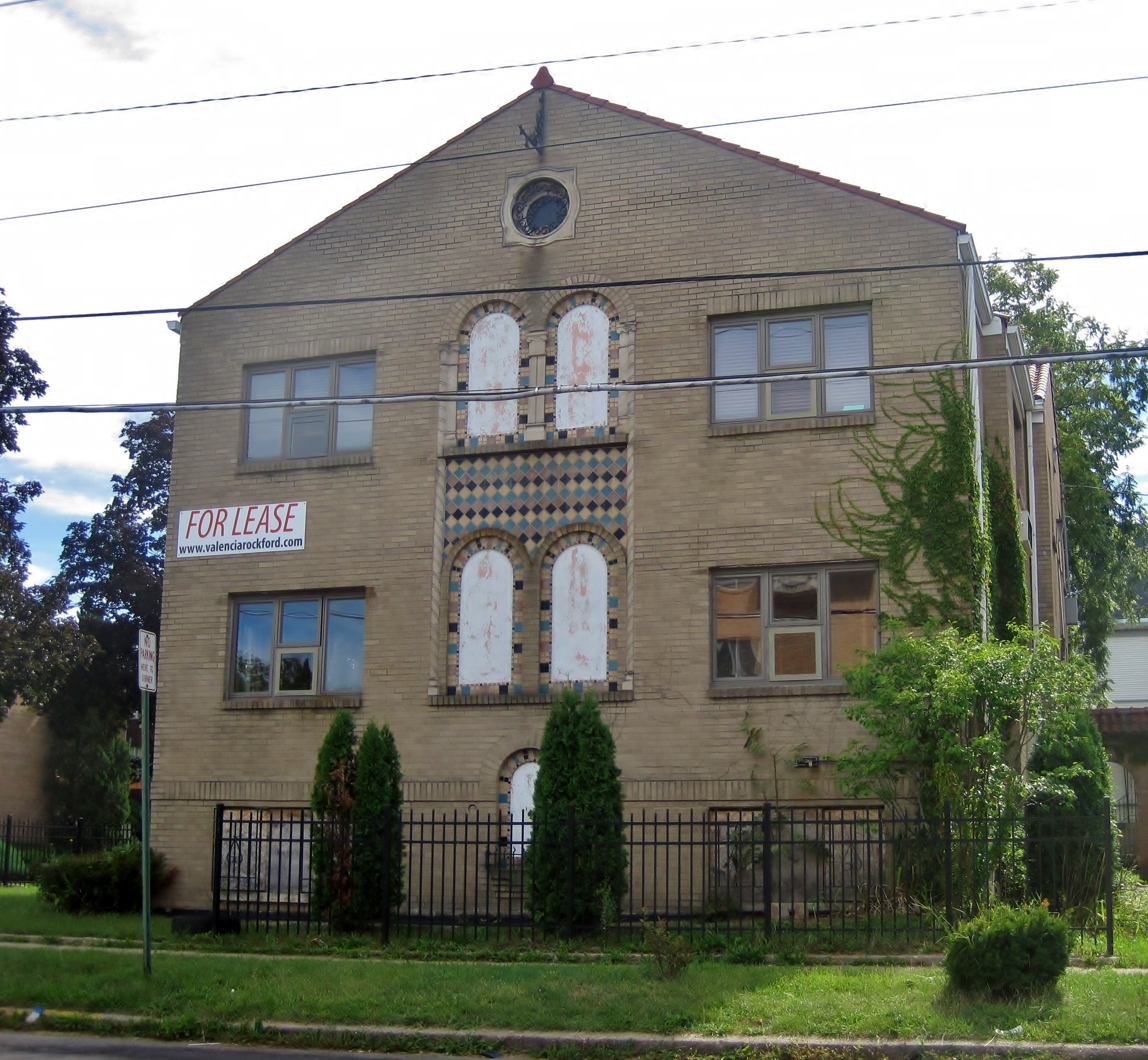

- Location within Illinois Location within the United States
- Location: 500-518 Fisher Ave., Rockford, Illinois
- Coordinates: 42.27927°N 89.09172°W
- Area: 1.1 acres (0.45 ha)
- Built: 1927
- Architect: Barloga, Jesse A.
- Architectural style: Mission/spanish Revival
- Part of: Garrison–Coronado–Haskell Historic District (ID11001030)
- NRHP reference No.: 09001123
- Added to NRHP: December 22, 2009

The Valencia Court Apartments is a four-building apartment complex in Rockford, Illinois, United States. Designed by local architect Jesse A. Barloga, the apartments are considered an excellent example of Mission Revival architecture in Illinois.

== History ==
The Valencia Court Apartments were built in the 1920s, a period of great prosperity for Rockford, Illinois. The buildings were built for residents seeking a moderately-priced place to live. The rooms were relatively small, but the high style of the building was meant to evoke the moderately-priced apartment complexes common to Chicago. Early directories indicate that they were initially home to a mixture of singles and married couples.

The apartments were designed by Jesse A. Barloga, an architect from Pecatonica. His practice in Rockford was very prolific. He was known for his ability to design popular revival architectural styles. At least 114 single-family homes in Rockford are attributed to Barloga. This Mission Revival design resembles Spanish missions in California and Texas. Elements of the style incorporated into the Valencia Court Apartments are stucco siding, red ceramic roods, arched windows and doors, and decorative ironwork. Barloga designed at least two other Mission Revival buildings in Rockford: the Villa Seville Apartments (1925) and the Eldorado Apartments (1927).

As a fine example of the Mission Revival of Illinois, the Valencia Court Apartments were recognized by the National Park Service with a listing on the National Register of Historic Places on December 22, 2009. Roughly two years later, they were listed as a contributing property to the Garrison–Coronado–Haskell Historic District.
