= H.D. Jameson House =

Historic house in Illinois, United States

- U.S. National Register of Historic Places
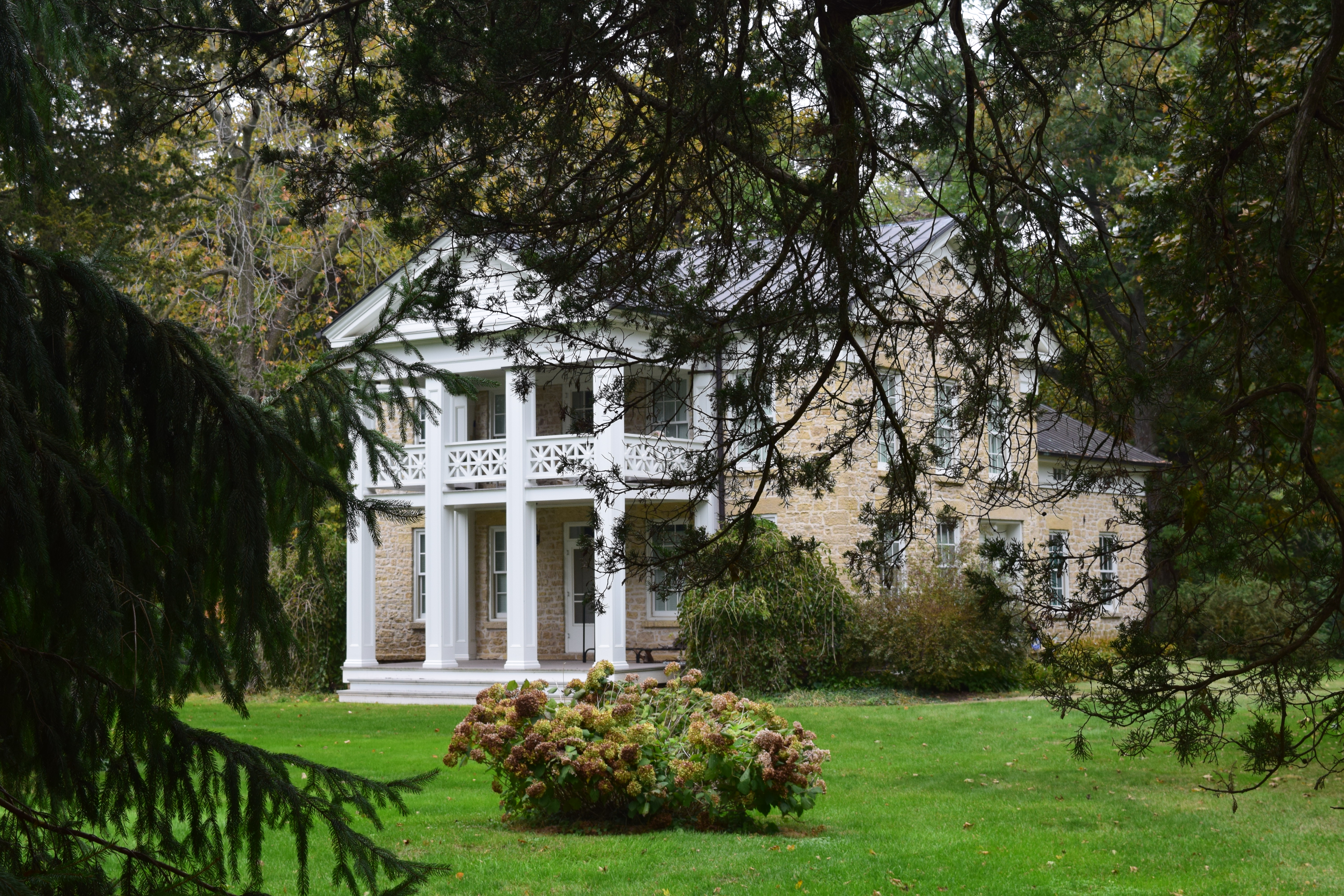

- Location within Illinois
- Location: 900 North Prairie Street, Rockton, Illinois
- Coordinates: 42°27′46″N 89°4′26″W
- Area: 2.5 acres (1.0 ha)
- Built: 1855
- Architectural style: Greek Revival
- NRHP reference No.: 03000915
- Added to NRHP: September 14, 2003

The H.D. Jameson House is a historic house located at 900 North Prairie Street in Rockton, Illinois. Local merchant and farmer H.D. Jameson built the house in 1855. The house is designed in the Greek Revival style, which enjoyed national popularity at the time of the house's construction. The random stone exterior of the house is punctuated by sash windows and the entrance, which is flanked by sidelights. The front-facing gable roof features a wide cornice with returns. A two-story portico was added to the south side of the house in 1870.

The house was added to the National Register of Historic Places on September 14, 2003, and it is now used as a short-term rental and event space.
