= Ziock Building =

- U.S. National Register of Historic Places
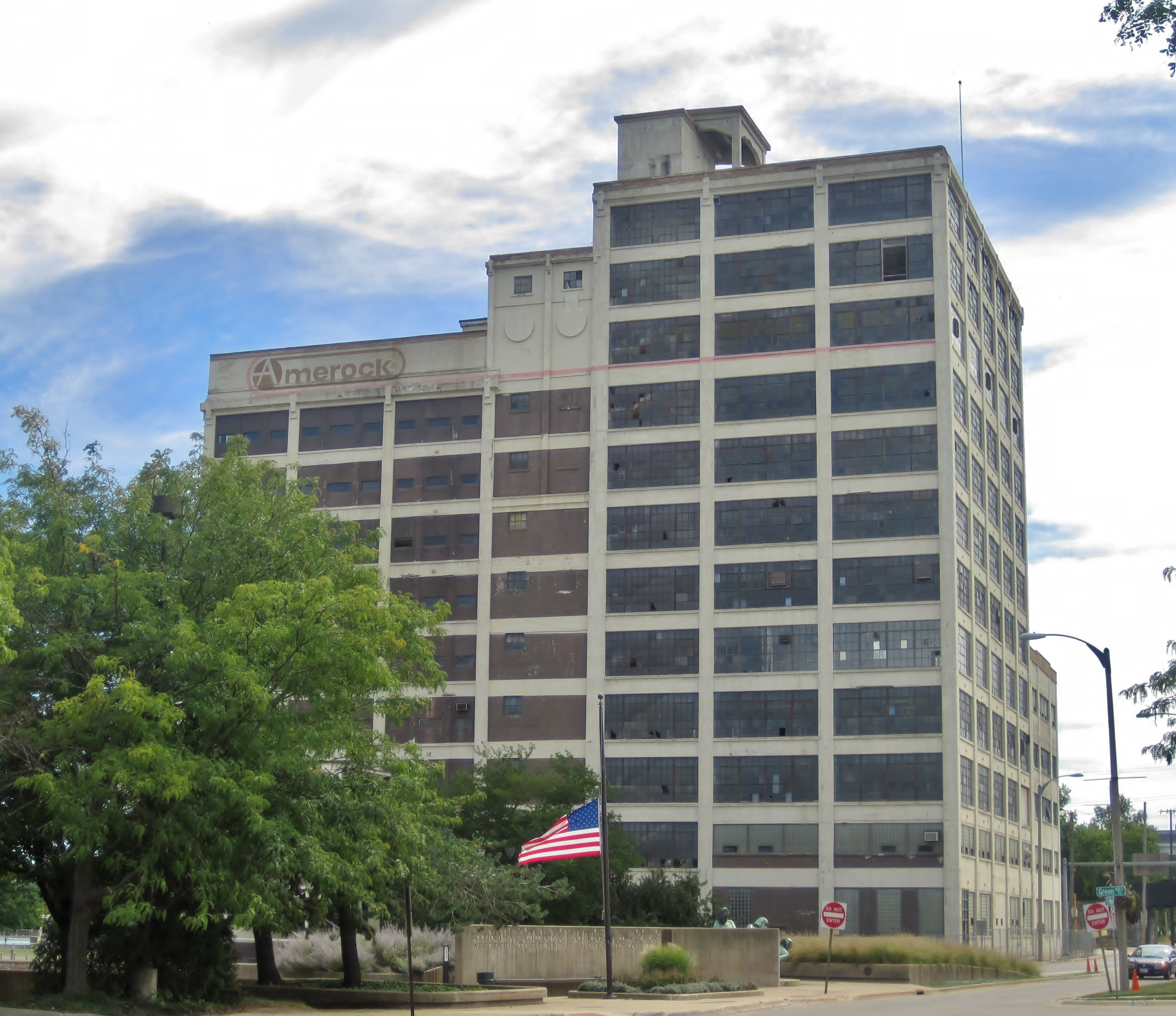
- The unused building in 2013

- Location within Illinois Location within the United States
- Location: 416 S. Main St., Rockford, Illinois
- Coordinates: 42°16′4″N 89°5′48″W
- Built: 1913–1950
- Built by: Majestic Construction Company, Holm-Page Company, Sjostrom & Sons
- NRHP reference No.: 11000246
- Added to NRHP: May 4, 2011

The Ziock Building is a historic skyscraper in Rockford, Illinois. Throughout its history, it has also been known as the Amerock Building and the Tower Building. Originally the home to several manufacturing enterprises owned by William H. Ziock, Jr., the tower became the headquarters of Amerock in the 1940s.

Last used for manufacturing in the 1950s, the building was later used for storage, leading to its abandonment. In 2015, the Ziock Building was purchased, commencing renovation and redevelopment of the site into a high-rise hotel and convention center, which opened in 2020.

== Early history ==
William H. Ziock, Sr. was a woolen goods maker in Hattingen, Germany who immigrated to St. Louis, Missouri in 1847. He rose to take over operations of the St. Charles Textile Mill. In the 1880s, the company was contracted to provide the Rockford Mitten Company with yarn. The two companies eventually merged, bringing Ziock to Rockford, Illinois. Ziock's son, William Jr., took over operations after his death. He expanded the company, selling wares under the B-Z-B Knitting, Ziock Paper Box Company, and King Company names.

In 1912, Ziock announced plans to build a ten-story building for B-Z-B Knitting operations. In 1913, Ziock decided to house all four of his companies in the new structure in an effort to improve efficiency. The building opened in late 1913, becoming Rockford's tallest building. By 1919, Ziock was seeking bids for an addition. In 1920, the thirteen-story addition was completed. Operations were successful enough to launch three subsidiaries: Beloit Hosiery in Seneca Falls, New York; Tenn-Rock Hosiery in McMinnville, Tennessee; and Manchester Mills, Inc. in Manchester, Tennessee. Production for the Ziock enterprises was slowed with the onset of World War II, as Japan had been their primary provider of silk. Furthermore, the labor shortages from the war greatly reduced the amount of product that could be manufactured. Ziock died in 1957 and the struggling company was dissolved.

However, the building continued to see use from a different source. The Aldeen Company rented space in the building in 1928 to produce hardware. Gedor and Ruben Aldeen came from Sweden in 1907 and founded the company in 1928. In the 1930s, they changed their name to the American Cabinet Hardware Corporation. In 1940, after years of sustained success despite overall economic hardship, the company combined the words Rockford and American to become Amerock, and used the name in their branding. In 1946, they purchased the Ziock building and operated on all thirteen floors. The company built the final, six-story addition to the building in 1950.

== Abandonment ==
By the 1950s, American Cabinet struggled to provide enough parking for employees in the downtown location. This prompted the company to build a new building in 1953. The company sold the building to L. C. Miller & Associates and continued to use space there until 1956. The company officially changed its name to Amerock upon moving out that year. However, a few years later, they repurchased the building for storage space. By 1977, Amerock had 70% of the national market share for retail kitchen products. However, the company could not survive foreign competition in the 1980s. Newell Rubbermaid purchased Amerock in 1987. The last company operations in Rockford closed in the 2000s following relocation to Columbia, Maryland and Huntersville, North Carolina.

== Redevelopment ==
On May 4, 2011, the building was recognized by the National Park Service with a listing on the National Register of Historic Places, making the property eligible for federal and state historic tax credits to cover a large part of the costs of renovation and reuse of the building.

In May 2015, the Amerock Building was purchased by developer Gorman & Co., with the intent to re-purpose the building. In April 2018, the building began being renovated into an Embassy Suites Hotel and Conference Center, which was expected to open on April 1, 2020.

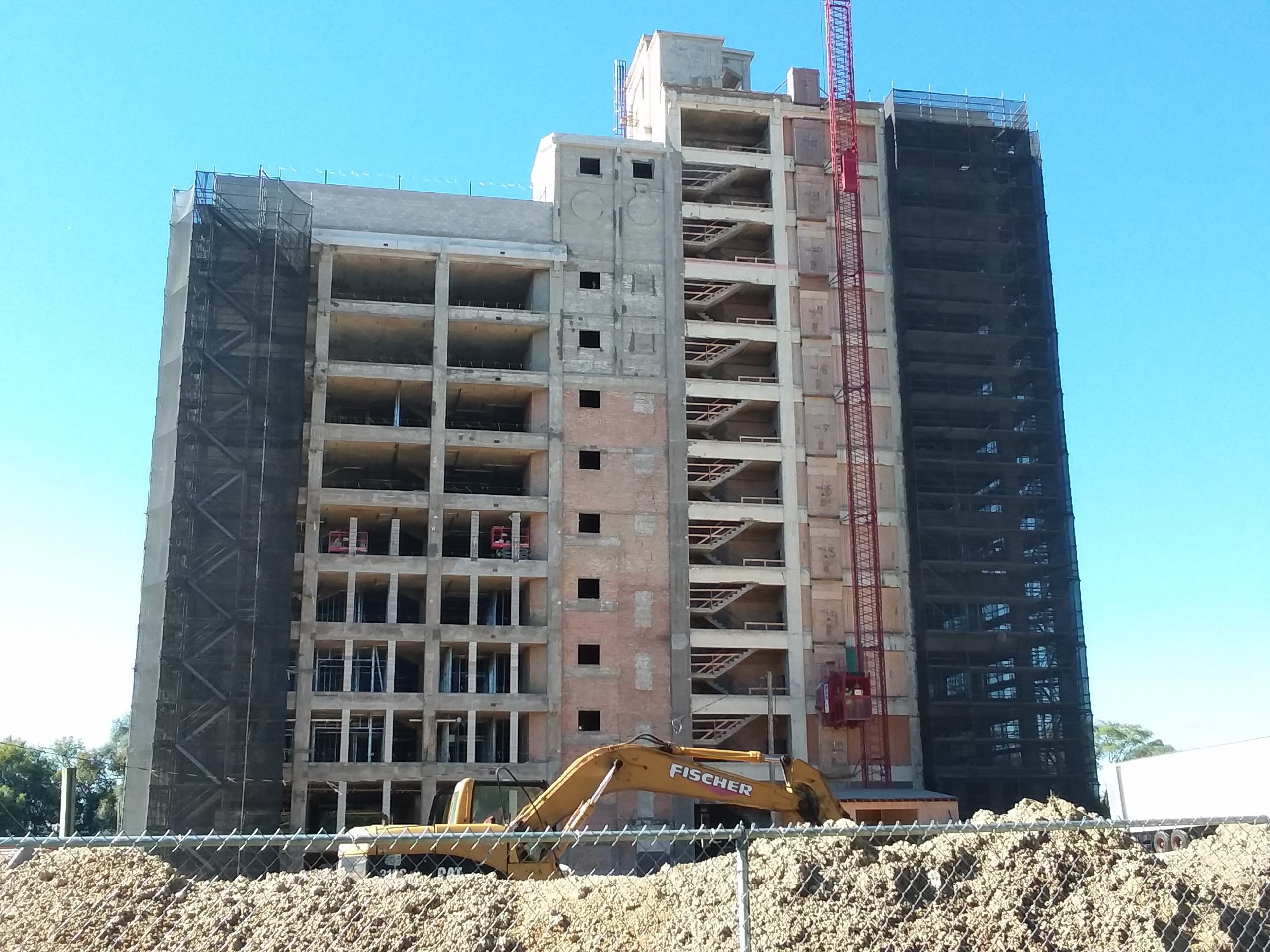
The building under renovation in 2018

On July 1, 2020, a few months behind schedule due to the 2020 COVID-19 pandemic, the hotel welcomed its first guests with a soft opening. The hotel's amenities include a pool and hot tub on the ground floor, arcade and fitness facility, gift shop, conference center, top floor restaurant with a rooftop bar, and 160 suite-style hotel rooms. In addition, Rockford Roasting Company opened its second location in the City of Rockford on the first floor of the building. On July 24, 2020, the aforementioned rooftop bar and restaurant opened to the general public after initially being open only to hotel guests since the hotel's July 1 soft opening.
