= Indian Hill Manor and Farm Historic District =

Historic house in Illinois, United States

- U.S. National Register of Historic Places
- U.S. Historic district
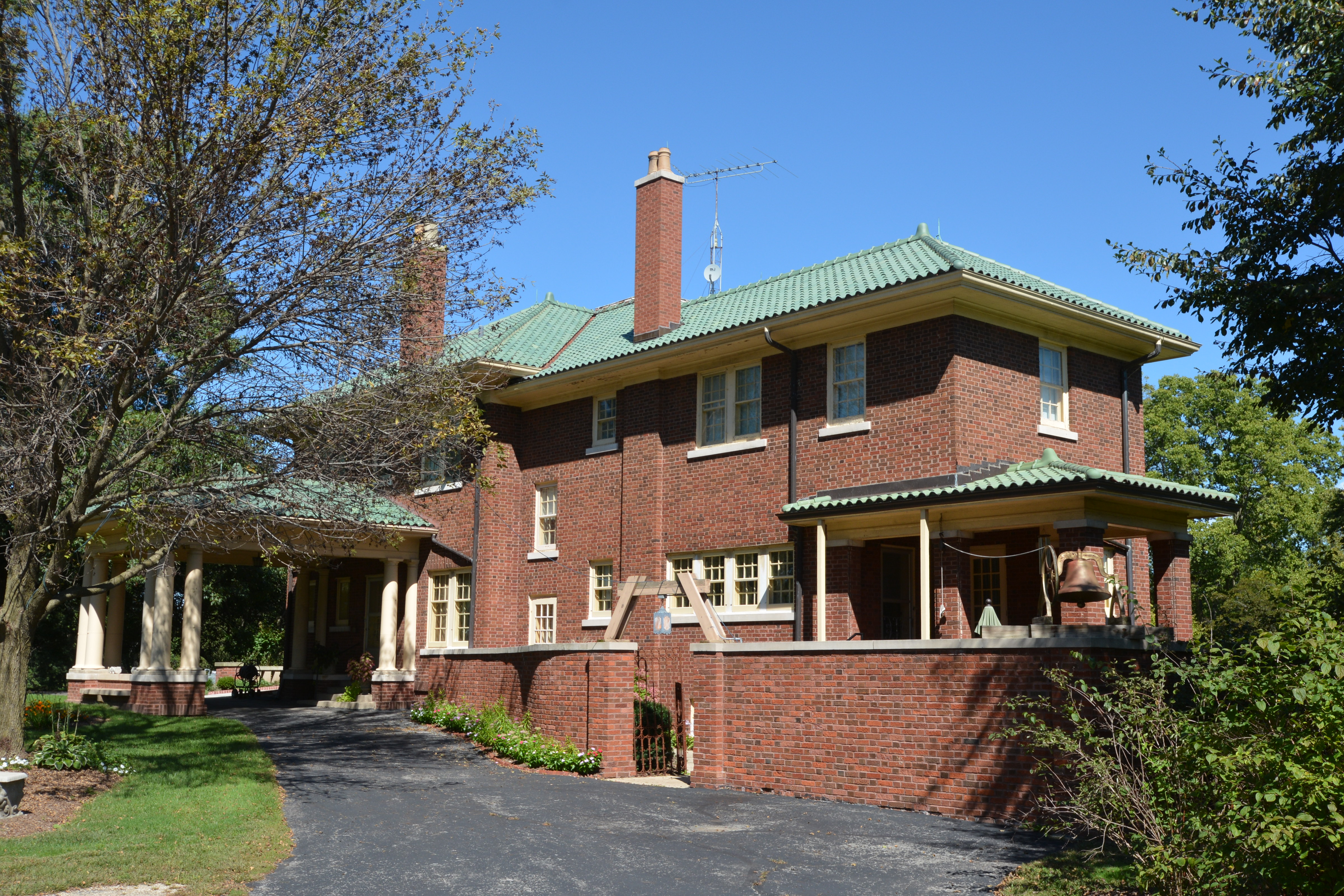

- Location within Illinois Location within the United States
- Location: 6901-7057 Kishwaukee Road, Rockford, Illinois
- Coordinates: 42°10′47″N 89°08′06″W
- Area: 257.5 acres (104.2 ha)
- Built: 1916-18
- Architect: Bradley, Charles Wyman
- Architectural style: Colonial Revival, Craftsman
- NRHP reference No.: 01000667
- Added to NRHP: June 21, 2001

The Indian Hill Manor and Farm Historic District is a historic house and farm complex located at 6901-7057 Kishwaukee Road in Rockford, Illinois. The district consists of three parts, all of which were once part of the estate of Charles C. and Esta Barrett: a manor house and coach house, a working farm, and a small forest preserve. Charles, a Chicago businessman, and Esta, an actress and socialite, purchased the property in 1915 with the intent of using it as a rural retreat and gentleman's farm. Rockford architect Charles W. Bradley designed the Colonial Revival manor house and coach house, which were built in 1916–18. Key Colonial features of the design include its rectangular massing, double-hung windows, and classically styled entrance; the house also includes Craftsman elements, such as its low hip roof with overhanging eaves and its exposed ceiling beams in the living and dining rooms. Charles died shortly after the manor house was completed, but Esta lived in the house until she sold it to her son in 1941.

The complex was added to the National Register of Historic Places on June 21, 2001.
