= Lysander Jacoby House =

Historic house in Illinois, United States

- U.S. National Register of Historic Places
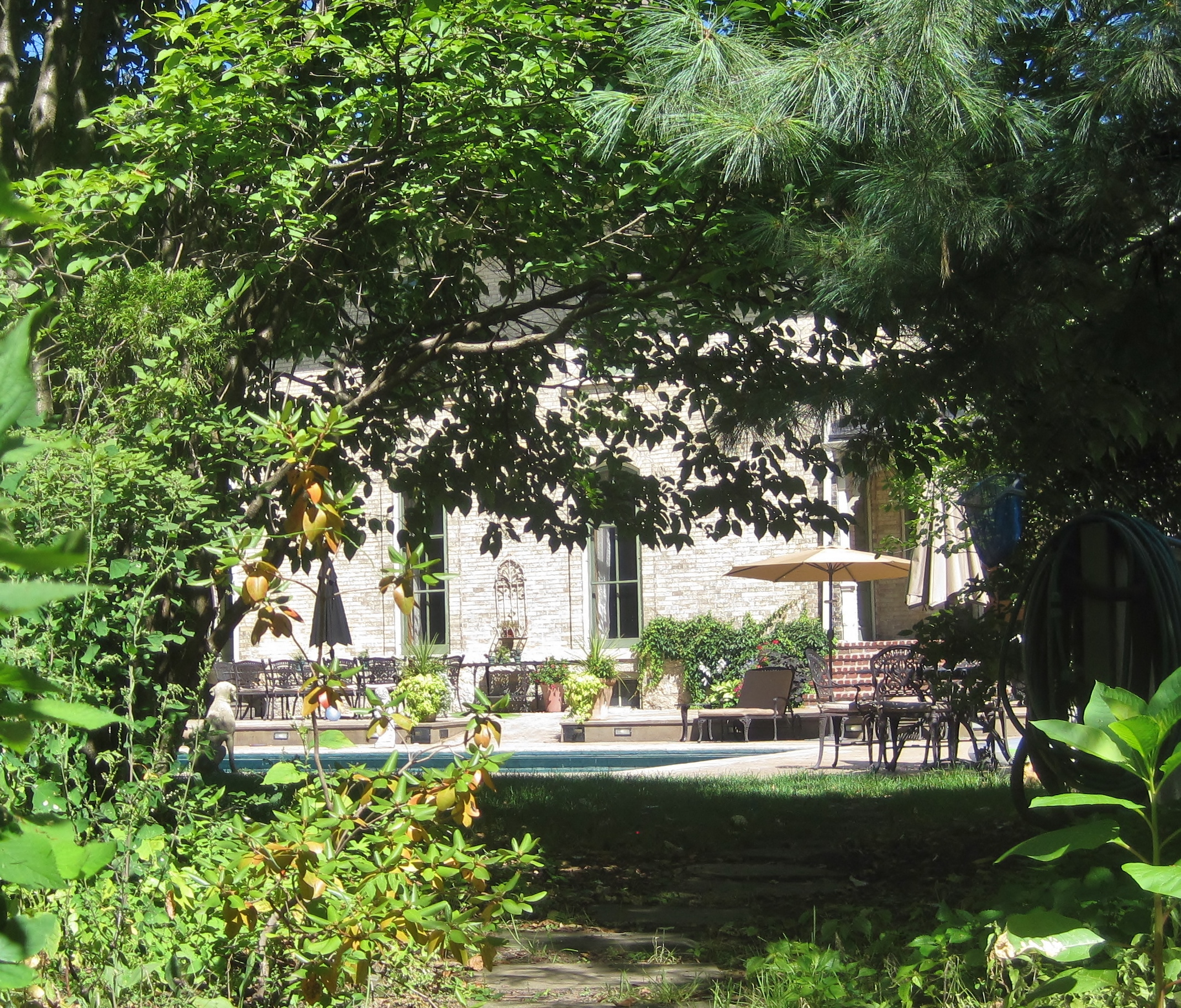

- Location within Illinois Location within the United States
- Location: 2 Jacoby Pl., Rockford, Illinois
- Coordinates: 42°17′14″N 89°3′45″W
- Area: 3 acres (1.2 ha)
- Built: 1865
- Architectural style: Italianate
- NRHP reference No.: 82002607
- Added to NRHP: March 5, 1982

The Lysander Jacoby House, also known as Burr Heights or Richwoods, is a historic residence in Rockford, Illinois, United States. It was built for Jacoby, a lawyer who became a recluse. It was later owned by a prominent grocer and a doctor, as well as Cheap Trick founder and guitarist Rick Nielsen.

== History ==
Lysander C. Jacoby, named after his home town of Lysander, New York, was born in 1816 and came west in 1834. He attended the Harvard Law School, graduating in the class of 1842. He was admitted to the bar the next year. He established a successful practice in Fort Wayne, Indiana and served on circuit courts. Jacoby came to Rockford, Illinois in 1862. He purchased a lot on the Rock River and built his house by 1865. Jacoby's behavior turned increasingly eccentric. He briefly practiced law with Horace Taylor, but then became a recluse. He attended the Second Congregational Church, but otherwise spent his time in his house with his family and large library. Jacoby died on September 30, 1900, and was buried in Rockford. His daughter Lillian taught drawing and painting at Rockford College.

Charles D. Burr acquired the house the year of Jacoby's death. He was a co-founder of Burr Brothers, a chain of grocers in Northern Illinois and Southern Wisconsin. They renamed the house Burr Heights and redesigned the landscape to make it one of the most attractive locations in Rockford. Burr lived in the house until 1919, when it was sold to Dr. Robert C. Bourland. A prominent local family, the Bourlands occasionally entertained Clarence Darrow in their house. The house was recognized by the National Park Service with a listing on the National Register of Historic Places on March 5, 1982.
