= Charles Lundberg House =

Historic house in Illinois, United States

- U.S. National Register of Historic Places
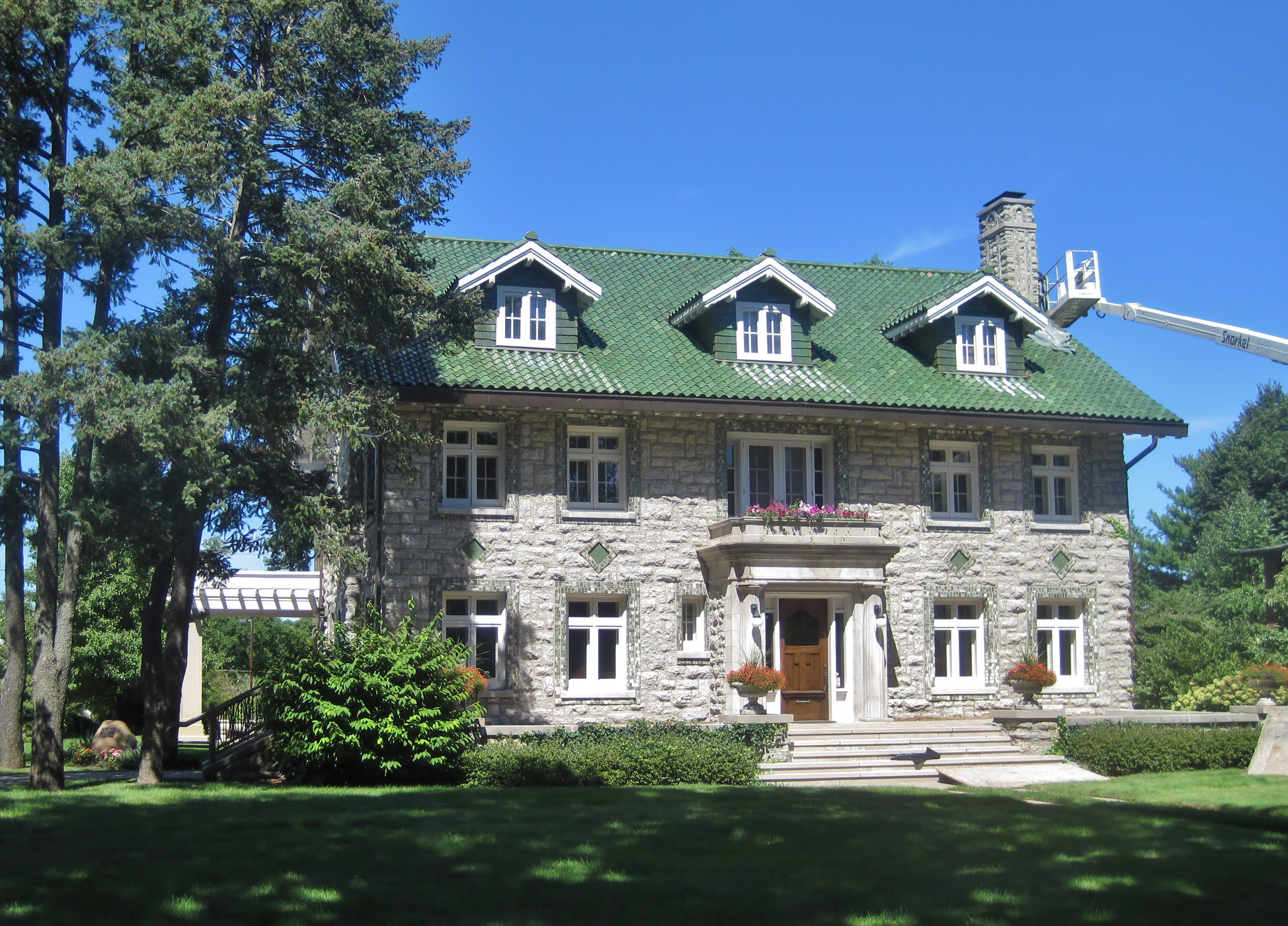

- Location within Illinois Location within the United States
- Location: 946 N. 2nd St., Rockford, Illinois
- Coordinates: 42°16′45″N 89°4′38″W
- Area: less than one acre
- Built: 1915
- Architect: Frank A. Carpenter
- Architectural style: Colonial Revival, Bungalow/Craftsman
- NRHP reference No.: 08001251
- Added to NRHP: December 30, 2008

The Charles Lundberg House, also known as the Old Stone Mansion, the Byron C. Marlowe Center of Philanthropy, and The Community Foundation of Northern Illinois, is a historic building in Rockford, Illinois, United States.

== History ==
Charles J. Lundberg was born in Kirkland, Illinois in 1871. He attended school at the Rockford Business College and decided to permanently settle in Rockford. He learned the furniture trade, working as a machine room operator, bookkeeper, and salesperson for various local furniture makers. Lundberg eventually amassed enough wealth to invest in a few companies. He founded and was the first president of the Co-operative Furniture Company; The Empire, Ltd.;, and the Rockford World Furniture Company.

Lundberg was vice president of the National Furniture Association of America for two terms. Outside of the industry, Lundberg was also the director of the Rockford Life Insurance Company and Commercial National Bank. He served as an alderman for nine years and briefly was the city's purchasing agent. He was named to the board of Rockford College and served for five years. Lundberg also served terms as president of the Rockford Board of Education and Rockford Symphony Orchestra. Lundberg lived in his 1915 house until the 1940s, when he moved to California.

== Architecture ==
Frank A. Carpenter was named architect for the house. The house is generally Georgian in character with its two symmetrical wings, large front porch, dormers, and side-gabled roof. The building includes American Craftsman details, such as deep eaves, casement windows, and glazed brick.
