= Condon Brothers and R. H. Shumway Building =

- U.S. National Register of Historic Places
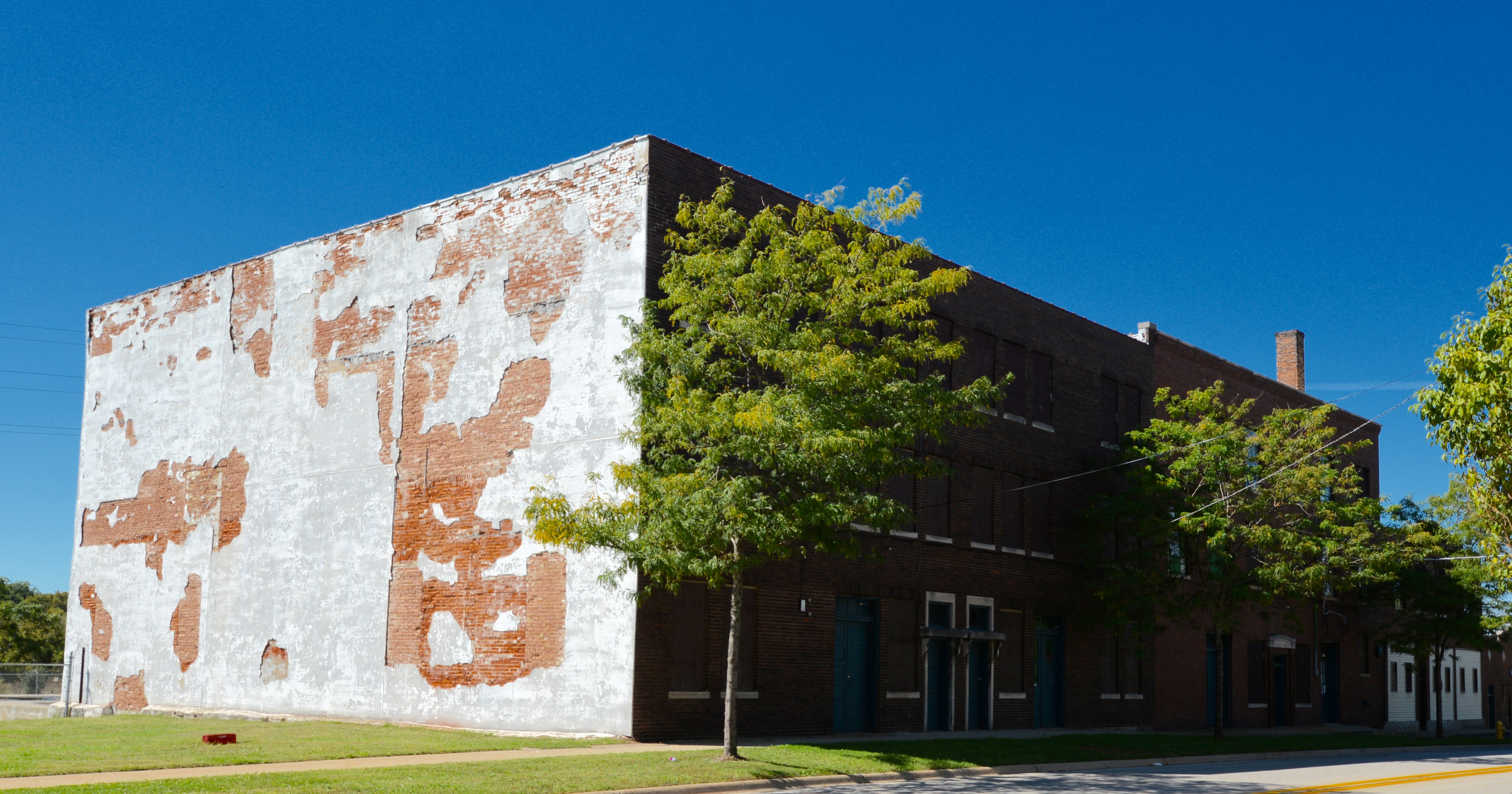

- Location within Illinois Location within the United States
- Location: 624-642 Cedar St., Rockford, Illinois
- Coordinates: 42°16′11″N 89°06′09″W
- Built: 1912; 114 years ago
- Architectural style: Commercial
- NRHP reference No.: 15000524
- Added to NRHP: August 18, 2015

The Condon Brothers and R. H. Shumway Building, located at 624–642 Cedar Street in Rockford, Illinois, is the historic headquarters of the Condon Brothers and R. H. Shumway seed companies. The building was built in 1912 for the Condon Brothers, a family-run company founded two years earlier. In 1933, the Condon Brothers merged with the R. H. Shumway Company; while the two firms still advertised separately, they both operated out of the Cedar Street building. The firms mainly sold their seeds by mail order, sending out two million catalogs a year at their peak; they were among the largest seed companies in the world and helped make seed sales a key piece of Rockford's economy. The headquarters building was used to mail catalogs and process orders as well as to clean and refine seeds before sending them to customers. The companies closed in the 1980s; their headquarters is one of the few surviving buildings from Rockford's seed industry.

The building was added to the National Register of Historic Places on August 18, 2015.
