= Rockford Woman's Club =

- U.S. National Register of Historic Places
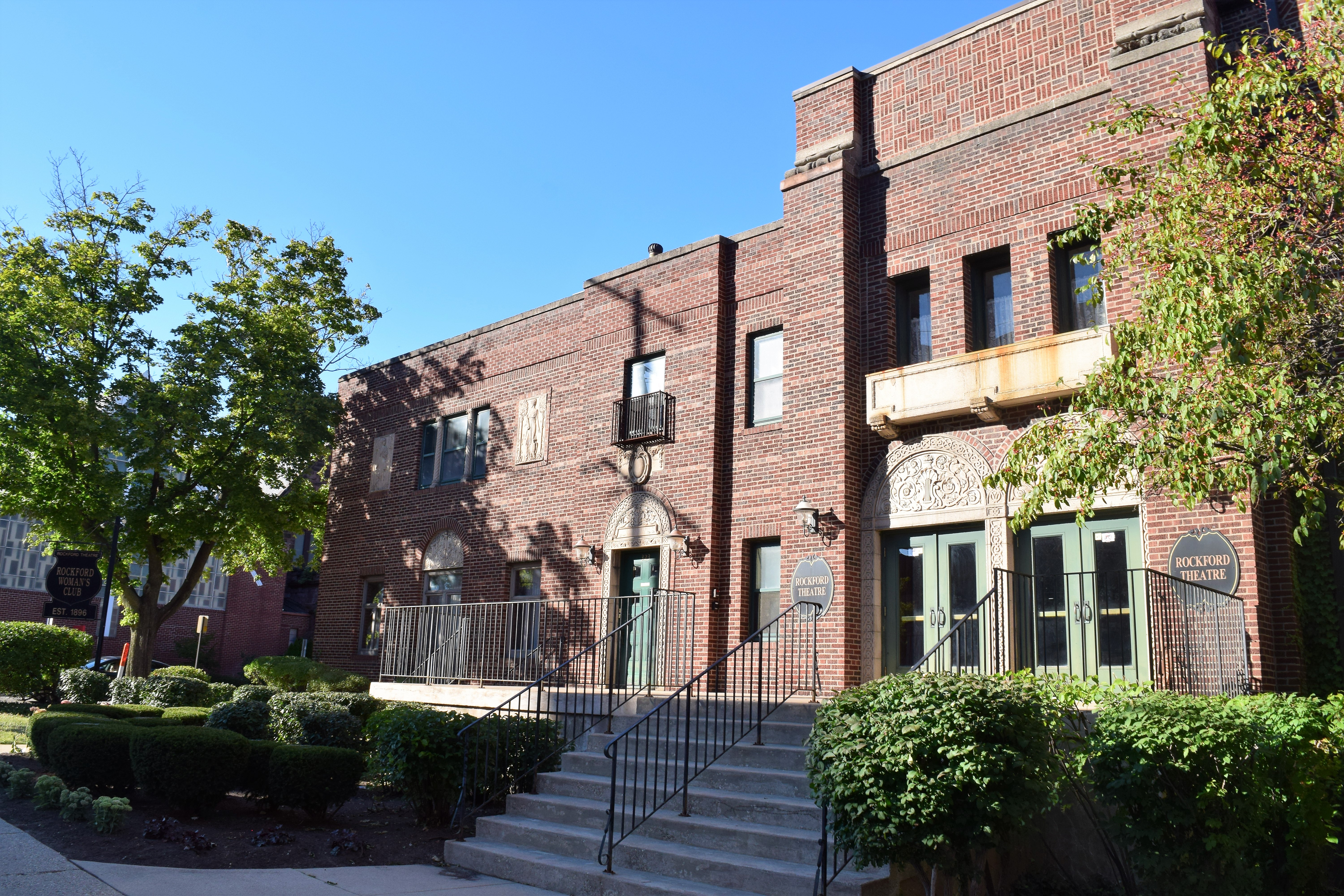

- Location within Illinois Location within the United States
- Location: 323 Park Ave., Rockford, Illinois
- Coordinates: 42°16′29″N 89°05′36″W
- Built: 1918
- Architect: Tallmadge and Watson
- Architectural style: Neoclassical
- NRHP reference No.: 100005971
- Added to NRHP: December 31, 2020

The Rockford Woman's Club is a women's club headquartered at 323 Park Avenue in Rockford, Illinois. The club was founded in 1897; originally known as the Federation of Woman's Clubs of Rockford, it united the city's nearly 20 active women's clubs into one organization. Women's clubs were popular nationwide in the late nineteenth and early twentieth centuries, and typically promoted women's rights and suffrage, community service, and the arts; the Rockford club was no different, as it created the city's first school lunch program and advocated for women's suffrage and eight-hour workdays. The club built a permanent clubhouse in 1918, which included an 800-seat community theater and a restaurant; the building has served as its headquarters ever since. Architects Tallmadge and Watson designed the Neoclassical building, while sculptor Nancy Cox-McCormack designed two bas-relief panels for its exterior. The restaurant, known as the Food Shop, became popular enough to merit an addition to the building in 1938; it operated until 1998, when the space was rented to a private restaurant.

The club building was added to the National Register of Historic Places on December 31, 2020.
