= Amos Catlin Spafford House =

Historic house in Illinois, United States

- U.S. National Register of Historic Places
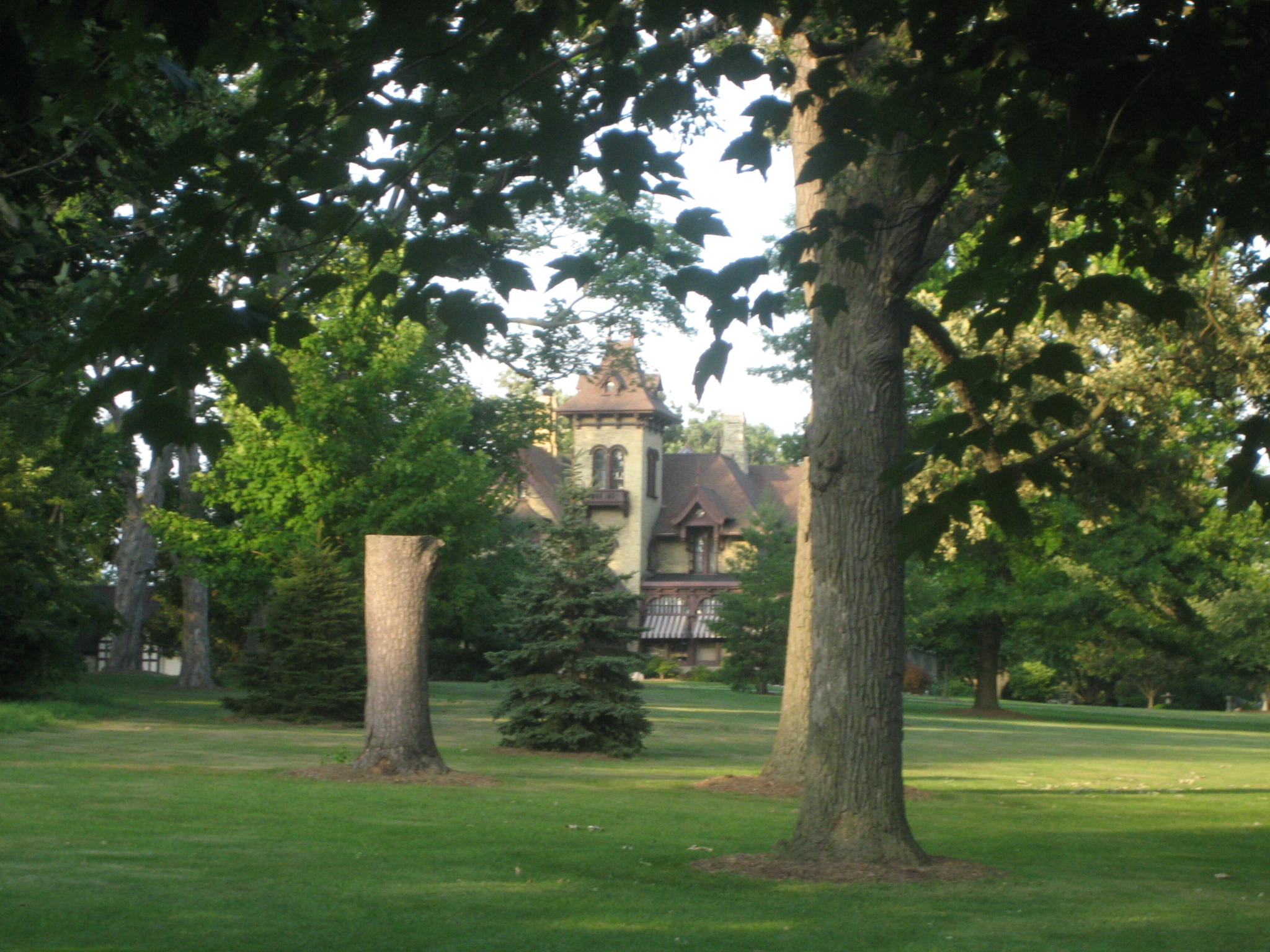

- Location within Illinois Location within the United States
- Location: 501 N. Prospect St., Rockford, Illinois
- Coordinates: 42.27224°N 89.06586°W
- Area: 15 acres (6.1 ha)
- Built: 1863
- Architectural style: Second Empire, Italianate, Gothic Revival
- NRHP reference No.: 80001425
- Added to NRHP: February 20, 1980

The Amos Catlin Spafford is a historic residence in Rockford, Illinois, United States.

== History ==
Amos Catlin Spafford was born in Adams, New York, and came to Rockford, Illinois, with his two brothers in 1839. There, he worked as a farmer and sawyer before opening a shop. He participated in the California Gold Rush and lived in the state from 1850 to 1852. In 1854, he founded a bank with C. C. Briggs and David Penfield. The bank reorganized in 1864 and became known as the Third National Bank; Spafford served as the first president. Spafford was part of the Illinois delegation to the Centennial Exposition. He served in this role until his sudden death in 1897 while on vacation in Adams. His son George served as president of the bank from 1906 to 1943. Daughter Jessie Isadore Spafford was a Vassar graduate Phi Beta Kappa and was President of the Rockford Woman's Club as well as the first woman president of the Rockford School District and taught at Rockford College. When she retired from teaching, she became a vice president of the Third National Bank and Trust Company at the same time her brother, George Spafford, was the president. The house was recognized by the National Park Service with a listing on the National Register of Historic Places on February 20, 1980, and is now occupied by a Great Great Grandson of Amos, Jonathan Spafford Whitlock.

== Architecture ==
The Spafford house was built in either 1863 or 1864. It is an excellent example of the Italianate style or architecture. Built with yellow brick, the house features a three-story tower. The house features a mansard roof indicating Second Empire influence. The house is on a 12-acre (4.9 ha) lot. The property includes two outbuildings, a garage and a groundskeeper's cottage, that were built in the 1860s. There have been few alterations to the property since. A veranda was enclosed in 1911. A small conservatory was added to the south side of the house in the 1920s. Two small service porches were added to the rear in the 1950s.
