= Herrick Cobblestone =

Historic house in Illinois, United States

- U.S. National Register of Historic Places
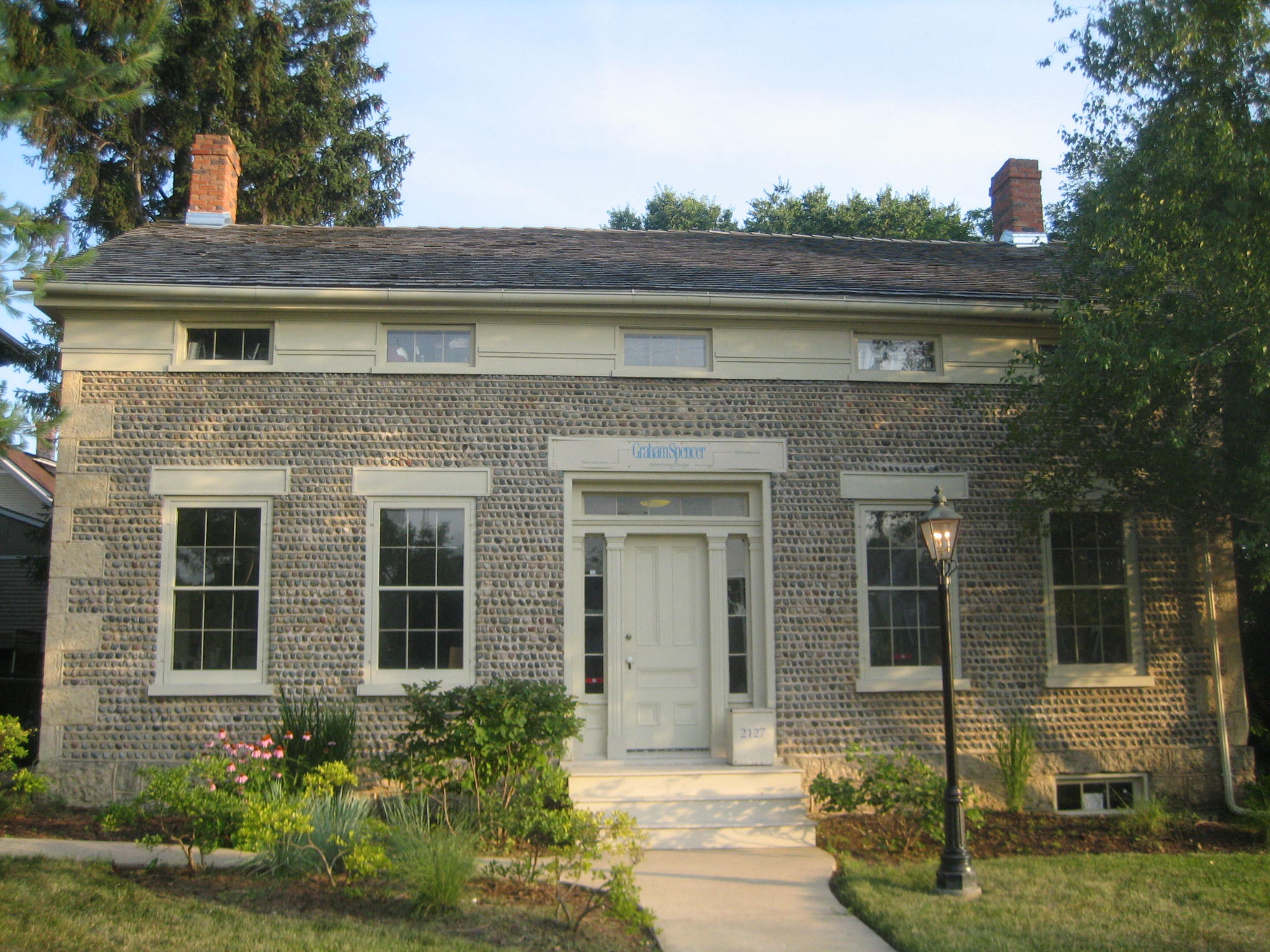
- Herrick Cobblestone in 2007

- Location within Illinois Location within the United States
- Location: 2127 Broadway, Rockford, Illinois
- Coordinates: 42°15′8″N 89°3′44″W
- Area: less than one acre
- Built: 1847
- Built by: Elijah L. Herrick
- Architectural style: Greek Revival
- NRHP reference No.: 80001423
- Added to NRHP: May 14, 1980

The Herrick Cobblestone is a historic cobblestone residence in Rockford, Illinois. It may be the oldest house in Rockford.

== History ==
The area around the Illinois-Wisconsin border once had the largest population of cobblestone houses outside of New York City. However, very few remain—the Illinois Historic Sites Survey in 1978 identified only two remaining. Cobblestone houses were popular among individuals who worked on the Erie Canal, and the style came to the border region from New York migrants. Little is known about original resident Elijah L. Herrick. Because of the nature of his house, it has been suggested that Herrick was a cobblestone mason. The stones are from the nearby Rock River. Herrick came from Massachusetts to Rockford in the mid-1830s, though he probably stopped in New York on the way and came to learn of the style. The house was recognized by the National Park Service with a listing on the National Register of Historic Places on May 14, 1980. It has been recognized as the oldest house in the city since the 1967 demolition of the Daniel Shaw Haight House (1842), although this has been disputed by a historian.

== Architecture ==
The Herrick Cobblestone is generally Greek Revival in style and resembles a common design for cobblestone houses. It measures approximately 36 by 26 feet (11.0 m × 7.9 m) with a two-way pitched roof. Walls are 15 inches (380 mm) thick and consist of a backing wall of large stones with a face of smaller cobbles. Eleven 12-inch (300 mm) quoins decorate the exterior corners. The quoins are large blocks of Platteville limestone. The house is on a foundation of Galena Dolomite. Chimneys are found at the end of the two gables, on the east and west. There are thirteen windows, each six-over-six. Lintels are wooden and are found on all except on three rear windows. The doorways has four sidelights on either side and a five-pane transom overhead. The front porch was added later and is Victorian in style. A small shed-like addition was built on the rear.

== See also ==
- List of cobblestone buildings
