= Turner School (Rockford, Illinois) =

- U.S. National Register of Historic Places
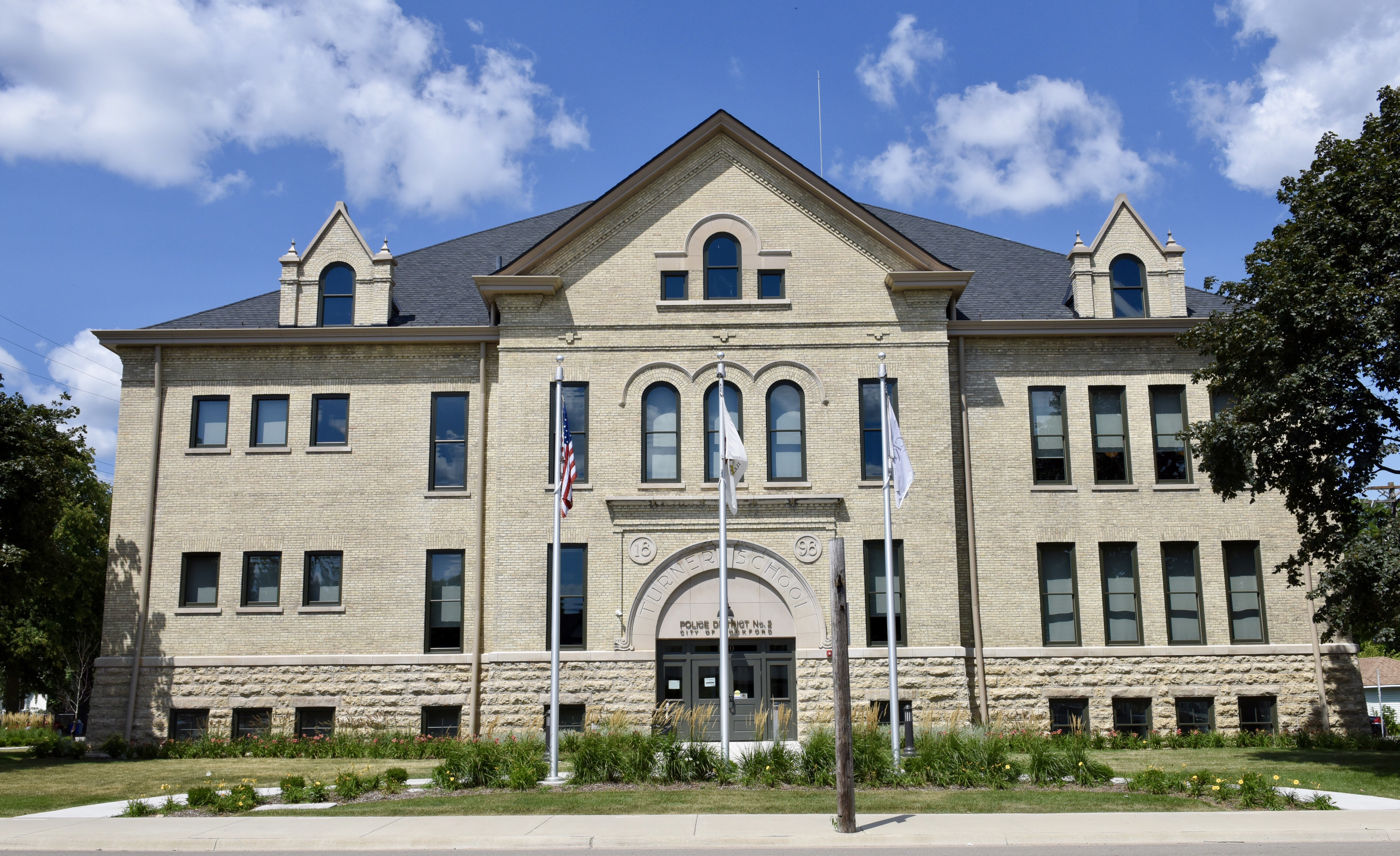

- Location within Illinois Location within the United States
- Location: 1410 Broadway; Rockford, Illinois
- Coordinates: 42°15′09″N 89°04′29″W
- Built: 1898
- Architect: Bradley & Carpenter
- Architectural style: Classical Revival, Colonial Revival, Romanesque Revival
- NRHP reference No.: 15000934
- Added to NRHP: December 29, 2015

The Turner School is a historic school building, located at 1410 Broadway in Rockford, Illinois. The building was added to the National Register of Historic Places on December 29, 2015.

== History and architecture ==
The school was built in 1898; it was named for city alderman J.M. Turner. Rockford architectural firm Bradley & Carpenter designed the school in a combination of three popular contemporary architectural styles: Classical Revival, Colonial Revival, and Richardsonian Romanesque. The 2 1/2-story building is built from brick with a limestone foundation and a hipped roof. The main entrance is on the south side; the arched entrance is located within a projecting bay with a gabled pediment. The building's roof includes an octagonal cupola and gabled dormers.

After the school closed, the building served as an abortion clinic from 1973 until 2011. In 2015, the building was approved for use as a police station.
