= Chick House =

- U.S. National Register of Historic Places
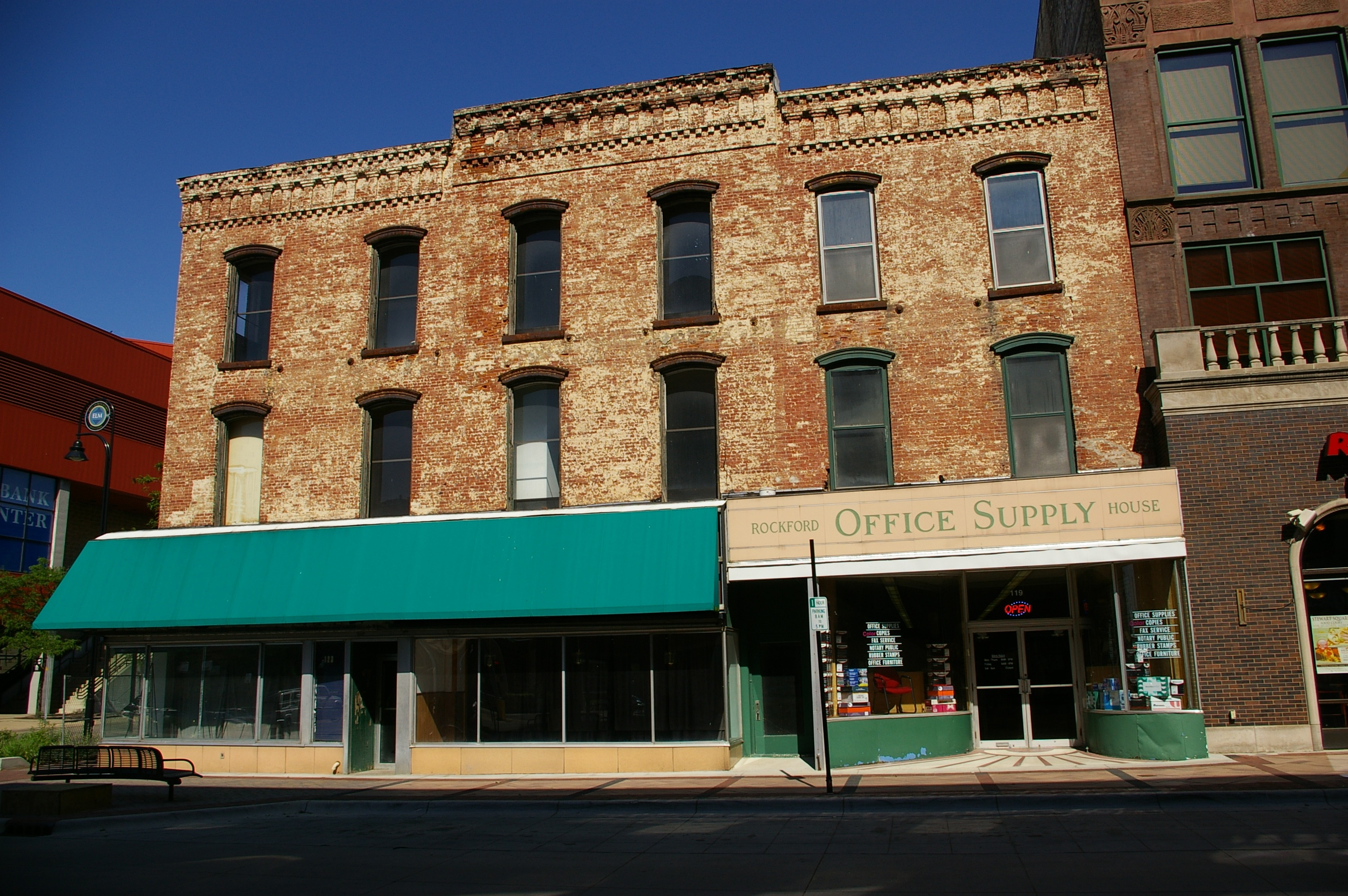

- Location within Illinois Location within the United States
- Location: 119-123 S. Main St., Rockford, Illinois
- Coordinates: 42°16′14″N 89°5′43″W
- Area: less than one acre
- Built: 1857
- Architectural style: Greek Revival, Italianate
- NRHP reference No.: 97000031
- Added to NRHP: February 7, 1997

The Chick House is a former hotel building constructed in 1857 in the city of Rockford, Illinois, United States. The building's construction was financed by three Rockford citizens and it operated as a hotel from its opening until 1951. The hotel was purchased by Thomas Chick in 1888 and he renamed it from the Griggs House to the Chick House. In 2004 the city of Rockford purchased two-thirds of the building and made some modifications to the structure. The building is a mesh between the Greek Revival and Italianate styles and feature simple ornamentation that contrasts with a neighboring building. The Chick House is a Rockford Landmark and was listed on the U.S. National Register of Historic Places in 1997.

== History ==
The Chick House is located in present-day downtown Rockford, Illinois, directly across the street from the Rockford MetroCentre. The Chick House was constructed in 1857 under the name Griggs House on the northwest corner of Main and Elm Streets in downtown Rockford. Its construction was financed by three Rockford residents, Dr. R.P. Lane, and two bankers, Thomas D. Robertson, and Charles H. Spafford. From its construction, the building operated as the Griggs House hotel. Thomas Chick purchased the building in 1888 and rechristened the hotel as the Chick House. Through the early 1900s parts of the building was occupied by various tenants as Chick leased out space, and Chick rented out space in adjacent buildings to supply additional lodging space for the Chick House hotel.

Rates at the Chick House, in 1902, started at US$1.50 per day, compared to the Nelson House at $2.00 per day; the Nelson House opened in Rockford in 1892. In 1903 the Rockford Morning Star called the Chick House and the Nelson House the leading hotels in Rockford. The same article noted the popularity of the Chick House with commercial travelers, regular boarders, and Sunday diners.

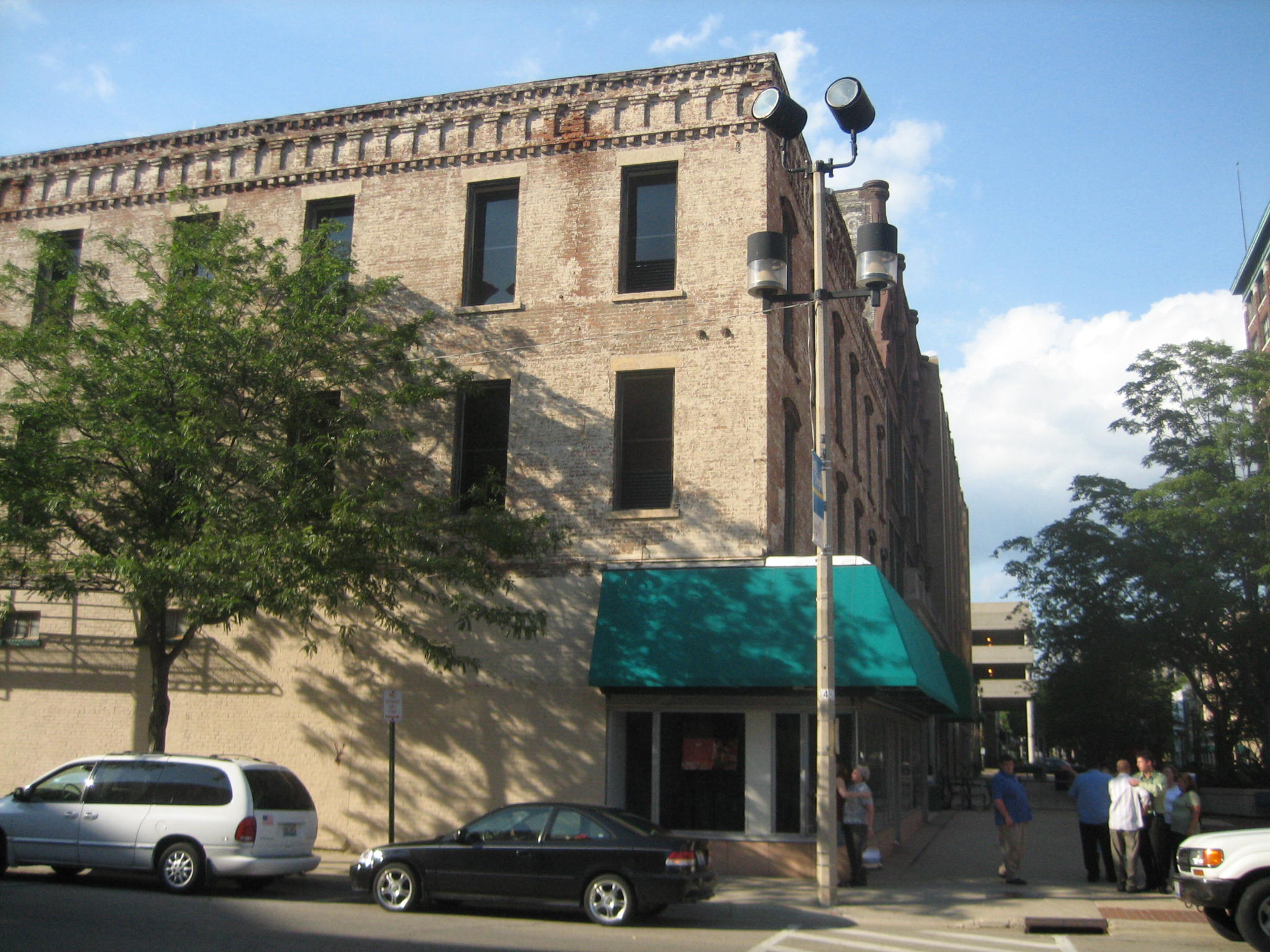
The green awning was added after the city of Rockford purchased part of the building in 2004.

In 1923, Thomas Chick's widow sold the Chick House to John A. Saye of Milwaukee. The Chick House, considered one of Rockford's resident hotels, was one of 23 hotels, and the oldest in the city when it sold in 1923. The Chick House remained in operation until 1928. The building was sold and closed for a time for renovations. During its closure, an office supply store, hardware store, and shoe store occupied the east end of the structure. In 1929 the hotel reopened under the name Elms Hotel, it remained in operation as such until 1951.

In 2004, the city of Rockford purchased two-thirds of the Chick House intending to redevelop the historic property. In October the city shut off gas and water, in part because of an old boiler which would not survive another winter; the electricity remained on during this time. The city set about to make immediate repairs to prevent the building from deteriorating structurally. The work included the installation of Plexiglas windows to keep further moisture out, the installation of a green awning on the east facade which wraps around to the south slightly, and repairs to the parapet wall.

== Architecture ==
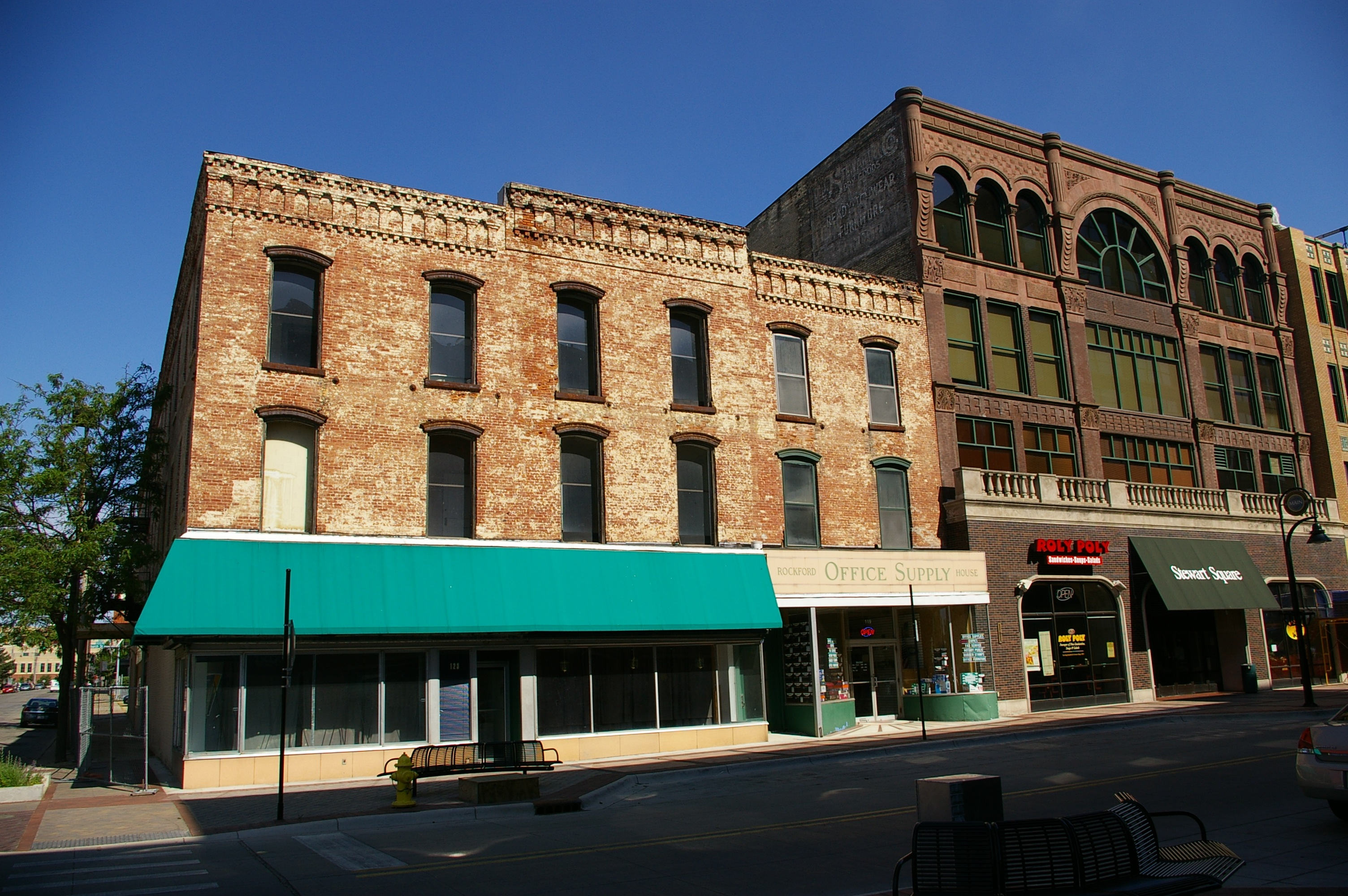
The Chick House's simple east facade contrasts with the adjacent Richardson Romanesque building.

The Chick House's design is simple and utilitarian, reflecting its construction for use as a hotel. The three-story brick structure's 66 foot (20.1 m) east facade faces Main Street and its 149-foot (45.4 m) south facade faces toward Elm Street. The building incorporates elements from Greek Revival and Italianate styles and presents itself as an architectural "antithesis" to the adjacent Richardson Romanesque Stewart Building. The Chick House originally has an "L" shape but additions during the 1890s, 1900s and in 1932 partially filled in the rear of the building, which faces toward an alley.

The utilitarian design of the Chick House is accented by simple decorative touches in the Greek Revival style. The style is most overt in the building's symmetry which is particularly emphasized by certain elements. Those include the steeped parapet, its windows, horizontal stone sills and lintels, and dentil moldings.

The building's meshing of Greek Revival and Italianate styles illustrates the rising popularity of the Italianate style during the 1850s and the shift from Greek Revival to Italianate. The narrow front facade windows and the brick corbel table frieze at the cornice are two elements of Italianate incorporated into the building. The Romanesque and Italianate detailing is emphasized within the front facade fenestration as well. The windows contain segmental arches and cast iron hood molds.

== Significance ==
The Chick House is one of three remaining pre-Civil War commercial buildings in downtown Rockford. It is also the only fully intact example of mid-19th century architecture in the city of Rockford. The only other two pre-Civil War commercial buildings in Rockford are located on the east side of the Rock River and have had extensive alterations to their front facades. The Chick House is the only building in the trio that has maintained its historic integrity, and the only 19th century Rockford hotel building still standing. The buildings architecture and its importance to the commerce of the city of Rockford led the U.S. National Register of Historic Places to approve its nomination on February 7, 1997. The Chick House is also listed as a local Rockford Landmark by the Rockford Historic Preservation Commission.
