= Garrison–Coronado–Haskell Historic District =

Historic district in Illinois, United States

- U.S. National Register of Historic Places
- U.S. Historic district
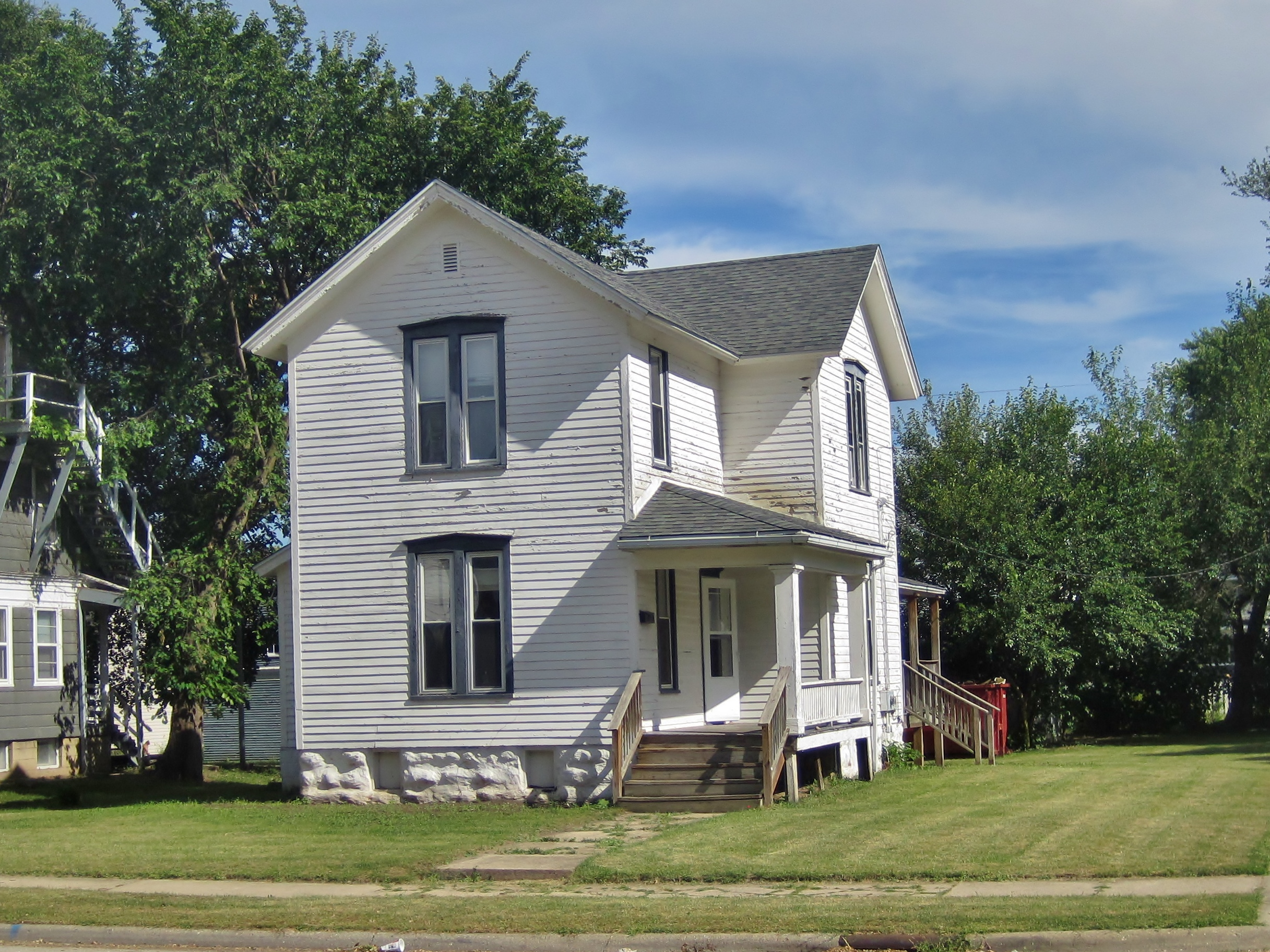
- The M. Buck House

- Location within Illinois Location within the United States
- Location: Roughly bounded by Salem, Summer, Main, Court, Whitman, and Winnebago Sts., and Fisher, Ridge, and North Aves., Rockford, Illinois
- Coordinates: 42.28258°N 89.08716°W
- Built: 1870
- Architect: Multiple
- Architectural style: Queen Anne, Shingle Style
- NRHP reference No.: 11001030
- Added to NRHP: January 12, 2012

The Garrison–Coronado–Haskell Historic District is a largely residential historic district in Rockford, Illinois, United States. Nearly half of the district is houses built between 1890 and 1900. 503 of its 564 buildings contribute to the district's historic fabric. George Haskell and Thomas Garrison were two of the earliest developers of the residential west side. The Garrison School and Valencia Court Apartments are part of the district.

== History ==
The Garrison–Coronado–Haskell Historic District is in the northwest side of Rockford, Illinois. Large-scale residential development first came to the city in the late 1850s. Thomas Garrison was one of the early real estate developers for the west side; he is the namesake of the Garrison School in the district. Dr. George Haskell developed the land adjacent to Garrison's, south of Whitman Street. The decision of Haskell and Garrison to subdivide their property was probably prompted by the connection of the Galena and Chicago Union Railroad in 1852. Although land values increased, development was initially slow. The district was close to the west downtown district and featured a scattering of homes by 1871. Fifteen homes from this period survive, two in Italianate style.

Thirty-seven buildings stand in the district that date before 1890. Unlike Haight Village, the west side district did not attract immigrants. Instead, it was initially home to some of Rockford's earliest families. This changed when the district exploded in popularity during the 1890s. From 1887 to 1891, Rockford added over ten thousand people to its population, many of whom came to work in the factories. By the 1930s, the district was completely saturated with single-family homes and apartment buildings.

The district was recognized by the National Park Service with a listing on the National Register of Historic Places on January 12, 2012. The aforementioned Garrison School was already individually listed, and contributes to the historic character. The Valencia Court Apartments, individually listed since December 22, 2009, are also a contributing property.
