= Seventh Street Commercial Historic District =

Historic district in Illinois, United States

- U.S. National Register of Historic Places
- U.S. Historic district
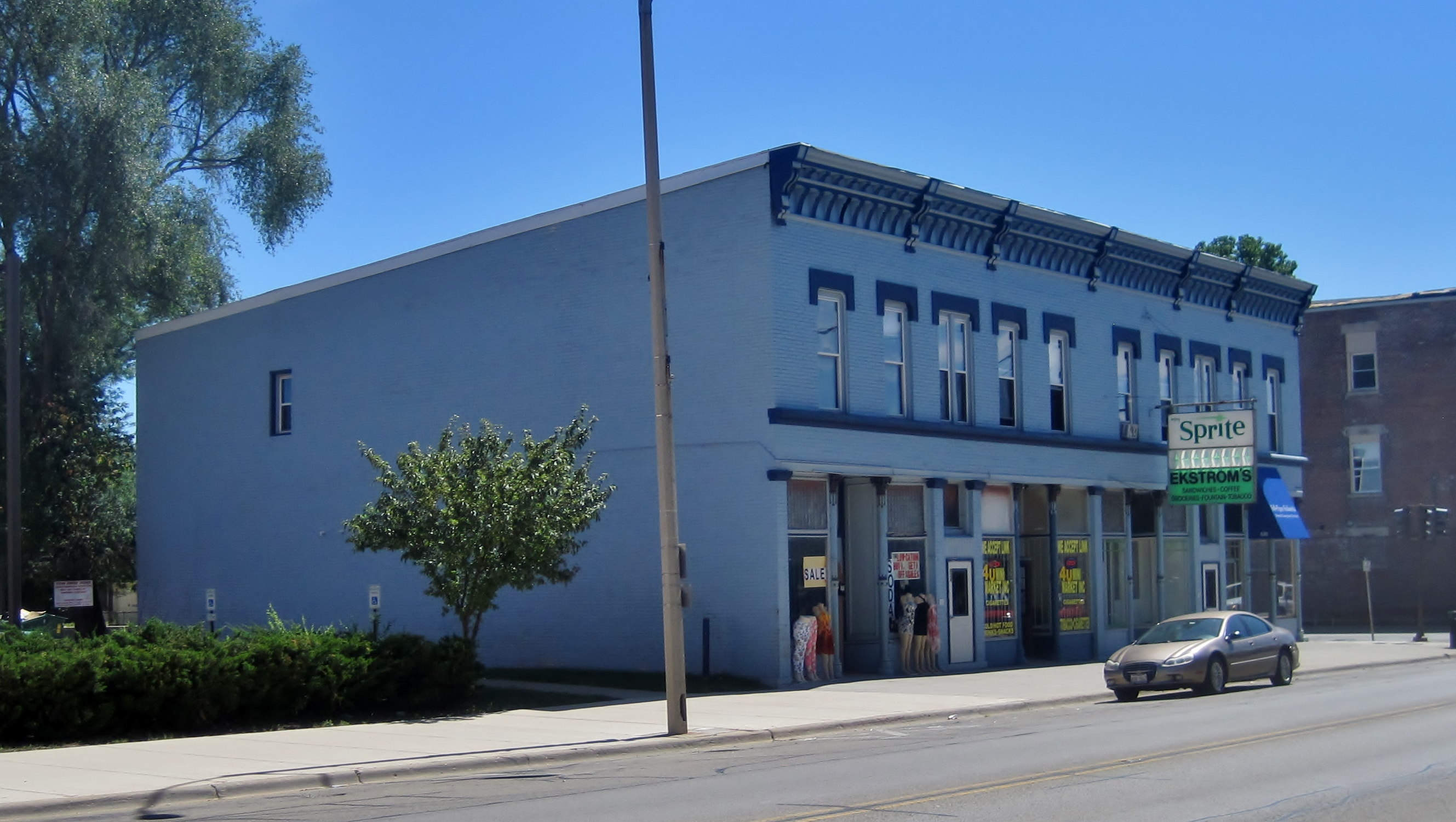
- Ekstrom's Shop

- Location within Illinois Location within the United States
- Location: Roughly bounded by 7th St., Charles St., 6th St., Keith Creek, Rockford, Illinois
- Coordinates: 42°15′44″N 89°04′50″W
- Area: 26 acres (11 ha)
- NRHP reference No.: 04001304
- Added to NRHP: March 23, 2005

The Seventh Street Commercial Historic District is a national historic district which encompasses several blocks of Seventh Street in Rockford, Illinois. The district was the commercial center of Rockford's substantial Swedish American community. Swedish settlement in Rockford began in 1852, and Swedes accounted for a third of the city's population by the 1890s; while the first Swedish American community formed around a railroad station on Kishwaukee Street, it shifted to Seventh Street in the late 1860s and 1870s. Seventh Street was home to the community's retail stores, community buildings, and two of its three banks. Forest City Furniture, the first major firm in Rockford's furniture industry, was also based there, as were many of its competitors. The buildings in the district exhibit many popular architectural styles of the late 19th and early 20th centuries, including Italianate, Romanesque Revival, and Commercial.

The district was added to the National Register of Historic Places on March 23, 2005.
