= Garrison School (Rockford, Illinois) =

- U.S. National Register of Historic Places
- U.S. Historic district – Contributing property
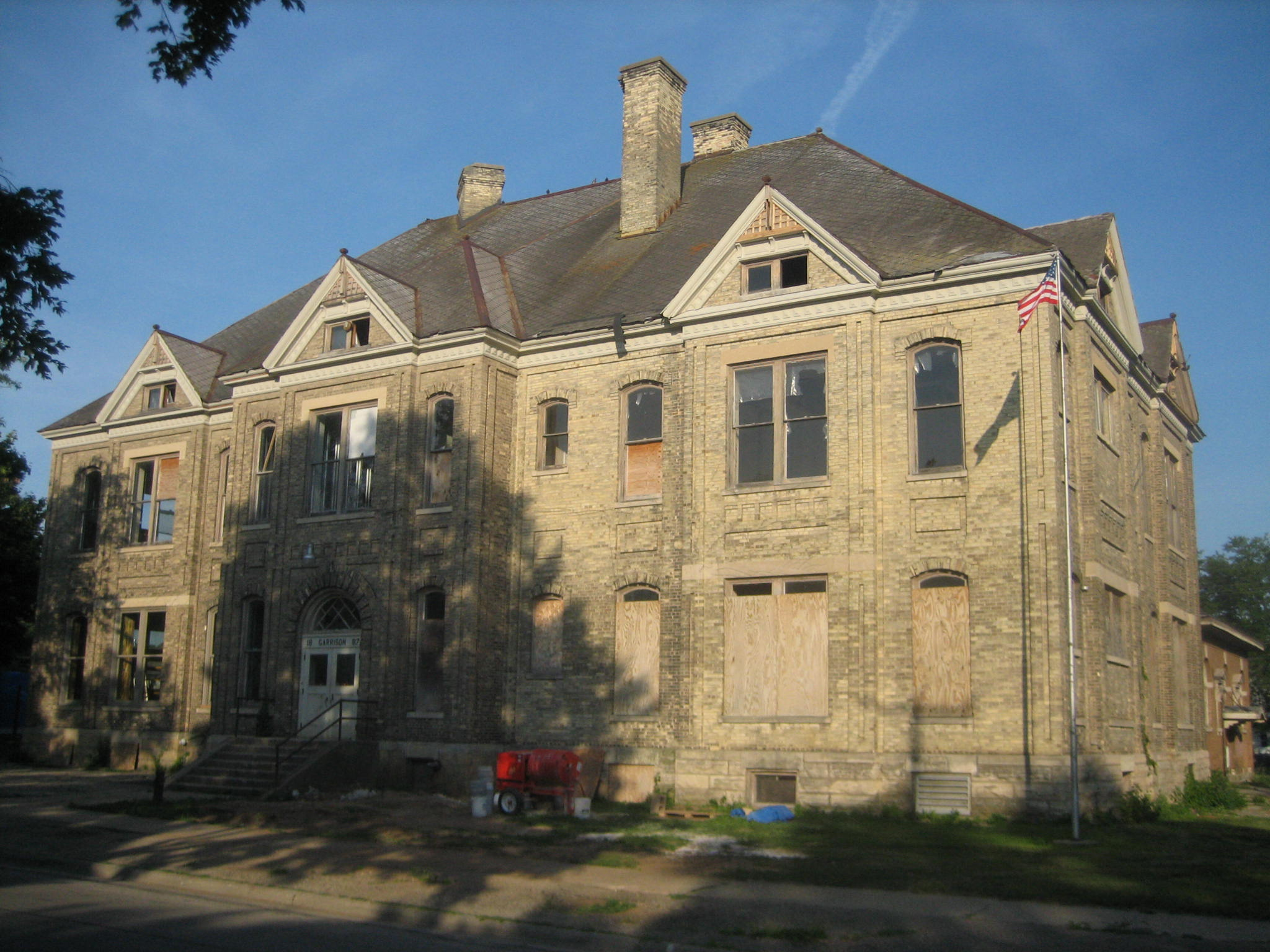

- Location within Illinois Location within the United States
- Location: 1105 N. Court St., Rockford, Illinois
- Coordinates: 42°17′00″N 89°05′09″W
- Area: less than one acre
- Built: 1887
- Architect: George Bradley & Son
- Architectural style: Late Victorian, Colonial Revival
- Part of: Garrison–Coronado–Haskell Historic District (ID11001030)
- NRHP reference No.: 06000005
- Added to NRHP: February 9, 2006

The Garrison School is a historic school building in Rockford, Illinois, United States. The oldest surviving school building in the city, the original building opened in 1887.

== History ==
The first school sessions in Rockford, Illinois were held in a log cabin starting in 1837. Until 1855, all education in Rockford was handled through private school. Prompted by a new state law in 1855, the city built its first public schools. The first schoolhouse, named Kent School, opened in 1857. Initially split into two districts, one on each side of the Rock River, the districts were consolidated in 1883. The first high school, Rockford Central, opened in September 1884.

Garrison School was built in 1887 to serve the booming west side residential district. The building was designed by George Bradley & Son, a prominent local architectural firm. It was named after Thomas Garrison, one of the early real estate developers of the district who died in 1871. Upon its completion, the school already struggled to meet the demands of the growing district. It was doubled in size in 1892 and other schools were opened to meet the needs. The first four principals were women. A gymnasium was added in 1920. Another addition, a one-story octagon, was completed in 1969. On February 9, 2006, the building was recognized by the National Park Service with a listing on the National Register of Historic Places. When the Garrison–Coronado–Haskell Historic District was established on January 12, 2012, the Garrison School was considered a contributing property.
