= Witwer House =

Historic house in Illinois, United States

- U.S. National Register of Historic Places
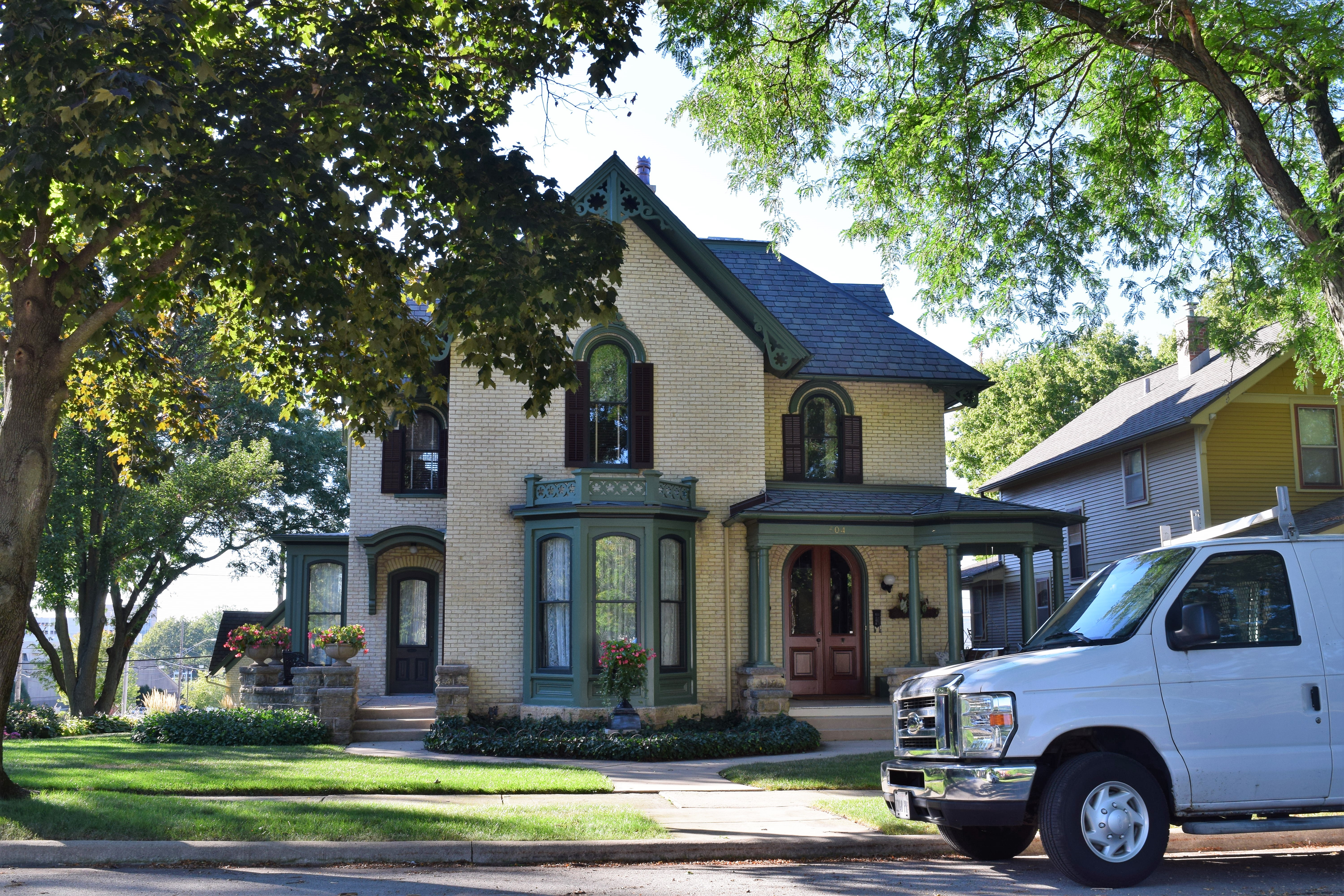

- Location within Illinois Location within the United States
- Interactive map showing the location of Witwer House
- Location: 504 North 1st St., Rockford, Illinois
- Coordinates: 42°16′20″N 89°05′08″W
- Built: 1876
- Built by: O. H. Wheat
- Architectural style: Italianate
- NRHP reference No.: 100006872
- Added to NRHP: August 26, 2021

The Witwer House is a historic house at 504 North 1st Street in Rockford, Illinois. The house was built in 1876 for Rockford alderman and merchant Benjamin Witwer and his wife. Builder O. H. Wheat designed the house in the Italianate style, which was popular nationally in the 1870s. The two-story brick house features a three-sided bay window in the center of the front facade, a recessed front porch, tall arched windows and doors, and a cross-gabled roof with Gothic-inspired decorative woodwork under the gables. The property also includes a brick carriage house built in 1879 with a similar design to the house. It is currently a private residence.

The house was added to the National Register of Historic Places on August 26, 2021.
