= William Brown Building =

- U.S. National Register of Historic Places
- U.S. Historic district – Contributing property
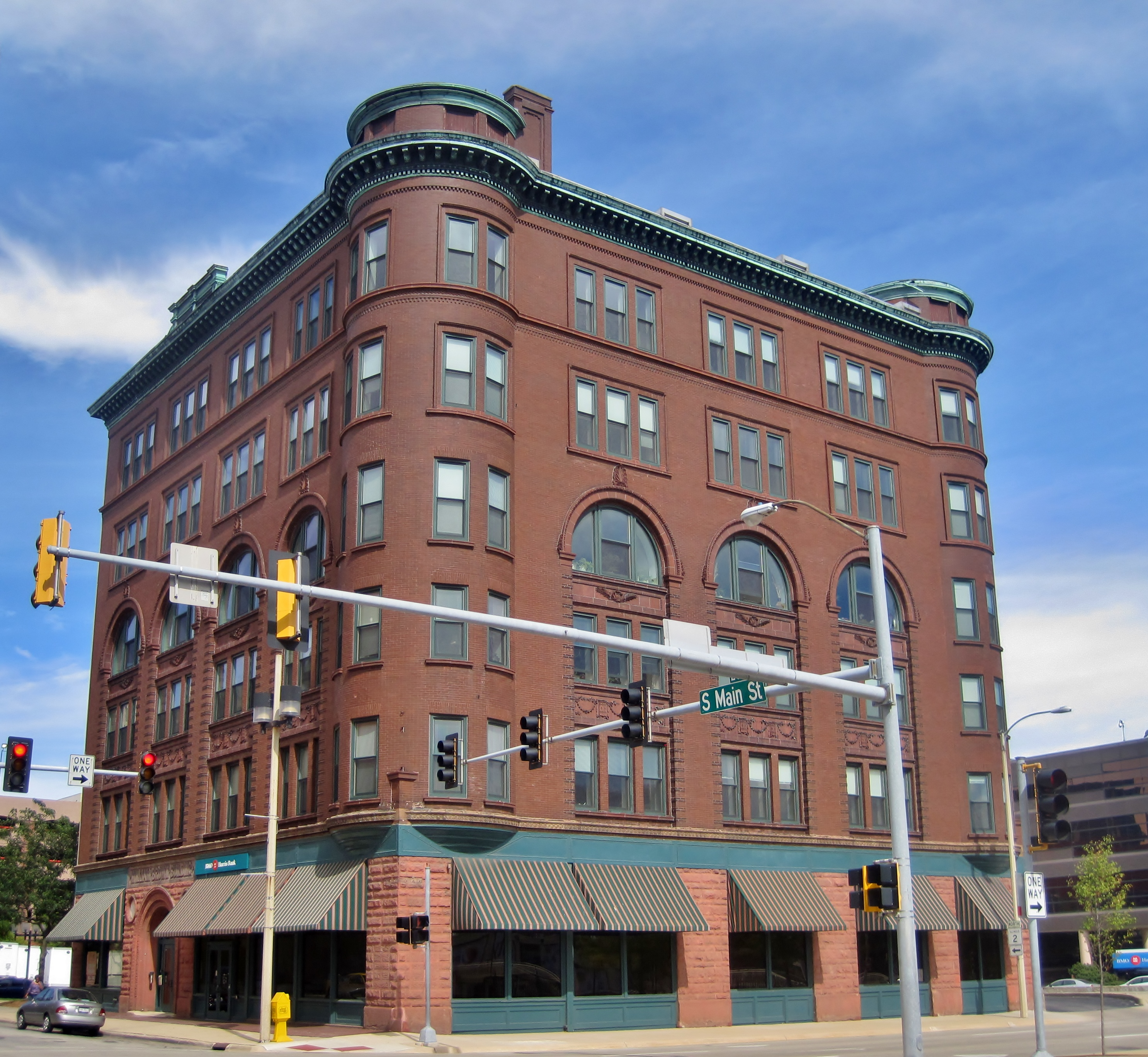

- Location within Illinois Location within the United States
- Location: 226–228 S. Main St., Rockford, Illinois
- Coordinates: 42°16′10″N 89°5′43″W
- Area: 0.3 acres (0.12 ha)
- Built: 1892
- Architectural style: Romanesque
- Part of: West Downtown Rockford Historic District (ID07000899)
- NRHP reference No.: 00000946
- Added to NRHP: August 10, 2000

The William Brown Building is a historic commercial building in Rockford, Illinois, United States. Completed in 1892, it is considered a fine local example of Romanesque Revival architecture. It was one of the last major commercial buildings in Rockford between the Panic of 1893 and the Roaring Twenties.

== History ==
By the 1890s, the west downtown district of Rockford, Illinois was finally beginning to eclipse the east downtown district. The construction of the Chestnut Street bridge opened the southern part of Main Street to commerce. The architect of the building is unknown. The Nelson House, sharing some architectural similarities, was completed the next year and may have had the same architect: D. S. Shureman. Judge William Brown was a successful lawyer and politician in the city who died during construction. The building was named in his honor.

The People's Bank of Rockford was the first tenant, moving in after construction. The Rockford Insurance Company soon followed. Until the completion of the Soldiers and Sailors Memorial Hall, the William Brown Building also hosted the local offices of the Grand Army of the Republic. However, soon after the building's completion, the Panic of 1893 occurred, freezing development in Rockford. For its role as a significant local example of Romanesque architecture, the National Park Service recognized the William Brown Building with a listing on the National Register of Historic Places on August 10, 2000. When the West Downtown Rockford Historic District was created in 2007, the Brown building was listed as a contributing property.
