= Haight Village Historic District =

Historic district in Illinois, United States

- U.S. National Register of Historic Places
- U.S. Historic district
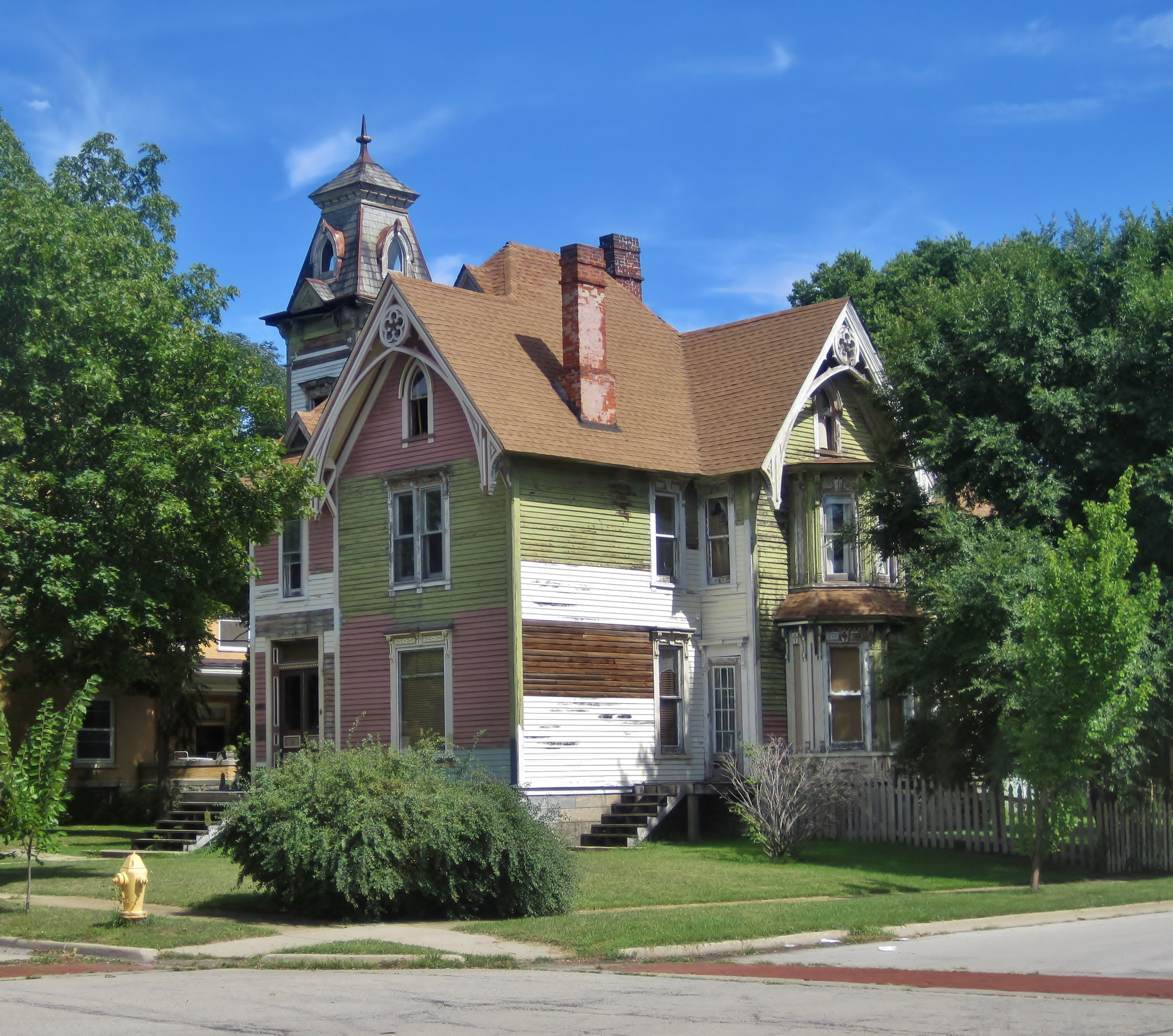
- 326 South Third Street, an 1883 Gothic Revival house with a Second Empire tower

- Location within Illinois Location within the United States
- Location: Roughly bounded by Walnut & Kishwaukee Sts., Chicago Northwestern RR tracks & Madison St., Rockford, Illinois
- Coordinates: 42°15′59″N 89°5′29″W
- Area: 42.4 acres (17.2 ha)
- Built: 1843
- Architect: Multiple
- Architectural style: Classical Revival, Greek Revival, Late Victorian
- NRHP reference No.: 87002044
- Added to NRHP: November 20, 1987

The Haight Village Historic District is an area in Rockford, Illinois reflecting the city's early residential development.

== History ==
Rockford, Illinois was first settled in 1834. That year, Germanicus Kent founded a settlement on the west side of the Rock River. The next year, Daniel Haight established a town on the east side of the river. The two towns were incorporated together as Rockford in 1839. The earliest east side development was within the confines of what is now the Haight Village Historic District. The oldest extant building in the district is the 1843 Wheeler cottage. A pair of houses still stand from the late 1840s at 314 South Second Street and 405 South First Street. Rockford's population grew from 235 in 1839 to 1,500 by 1850.

John Lake built many of the early houses in Rockford. His lumberyard was in the East Rockford district and he worked as a carpenter and contractor. He lived at 612 Oak Street in Haight Village from its construction until 1874. Judge William Brown, mayor of Rockford and member of the Illinois General Assembly, lived in the district starting in 1858. With increasing immigration following the Civil War, Haight Village became a Swedish community. John Erlander, a Swedish immigrant, became one of Rockford's foremost business leaders, founding the Rockford Union Furniture Company and Excelsior Furniture Company. His 1871 house is now a museum operated by the Swedish Historical Society of Rockford.

Although the district is mostly residential, there are a few exceptions. The 1873 Rockford Watch Company factory building was part of the industrial district that stretched along the river. It is largely of the Italianate style, although additions in 1910 and 1930 do not match. This is one of the few remaining industrial buildings from this era in Rockford. Rockford Central High School was completed in 1905. It was the city's only high school until 1940. Haight Village was recognized as a historic district by the National Park Service on November 20, 1987.
