= Greenwood Cemetery (Rockford, Illinois) =

- Greenwood Cemetery Chapel and Crematory
- U.S. National Register of Historic Places
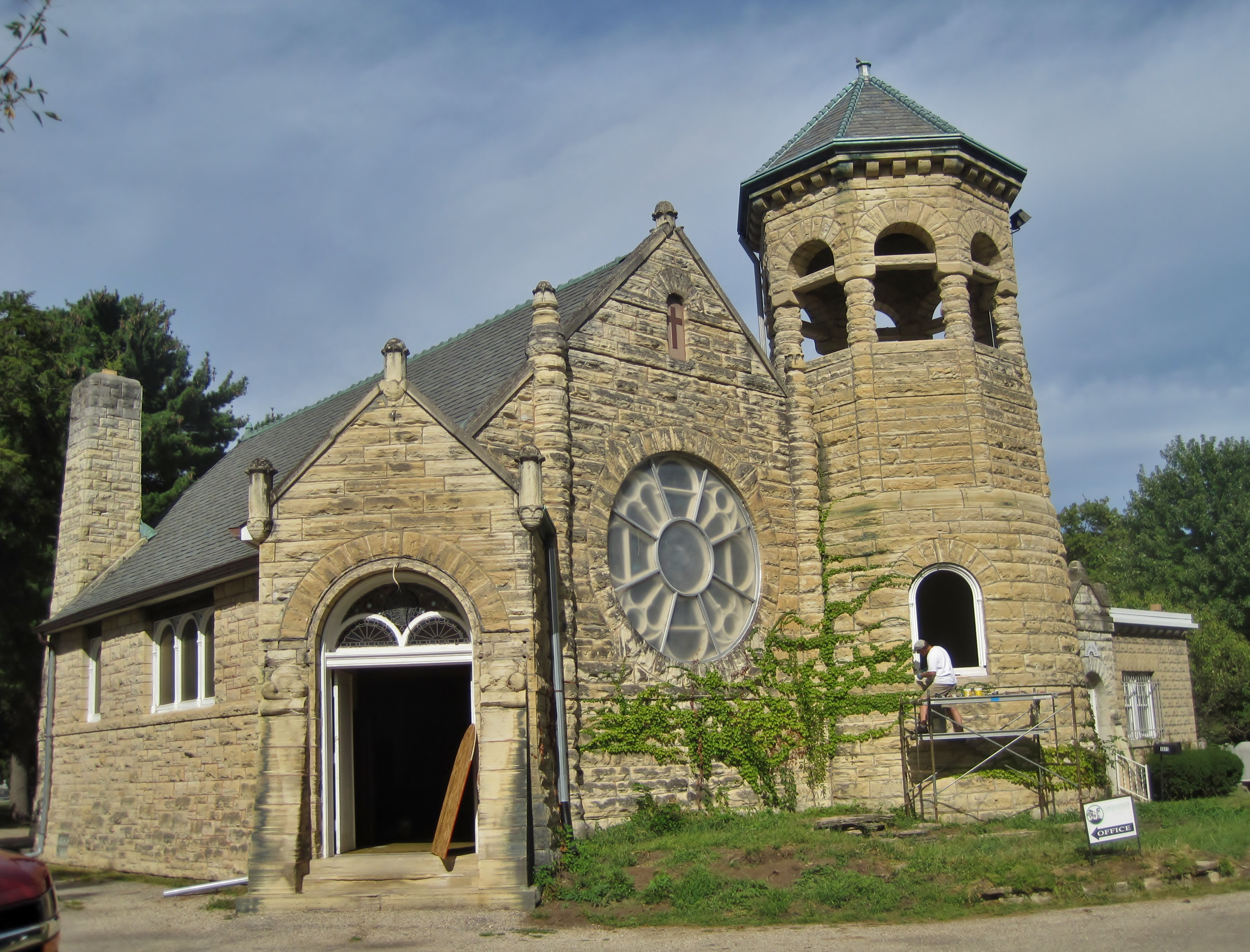

- Location within Illinois Location within the United States
- Location: 1011 Auburn St., Rockford, Illinois
- Coordinates: 42°17′25″N 89°4′40″W
- Built: 1891
- Architectural style: Richardsonian Romanesque
- NRHP reference No.: 12000554
- Added to NRHP: August 28, 2012

Greenwood Cemetery is a 100-acre (40 ha) cemetery in Rockford, Illinois. Founded in 1852, it is the largest and oldest in the city. The Greenwood Cemetery Chapel and Crematory was listed on the National Register of Historic Places.

== History ==
In 1838, the first burial occurred in Rockford, Illinois, shortly after the settlement was founded. A man drowned in the Rock River and his body was buried on a plot which is now near the intersection of Cedar and Winnebago Streets. The daughter of Germanicus Kent was buried nearby, making it the first city burial ground. In the early 1840s, a new area was briefly used for burials on the south side of State Street. In 1844, the property was exchanged for two lots on the north bank of Kent's Creek. It was chartered the next year as the Rockford Cemetery Association. After another cemetery was chartered in 1853, the Rockford Cemetery Association's land became known as the West Side Cemetery.

In 1852, the Galena and Chicago Union Railroad connected to Rockford and needed to use the lands of the West Side Cemetery. The cemetery moved to the northeast corner of Main and Auburn Streets. It was officially incorporated on June 23, 1852. The land was selected because it was 1.5 miles (2.4 km) north of the business district and thus safe from another forced relocation. An additional 17 acres (6.9 ha) were purchased from D. C. Littlefield in 1879.

=== Chapel and crematory ===
In 1887, the cemetery decided to build a chapel to provide shelter for services during inclement weather. The chapel was designed by Henry Lord Gay in the Richardsonian Romanesque style. Its tower was meant to resember a Roman War Tower. A 7 feet (2.1 m) onyx was installed, engraved with the named of those who died in combat. The chapel may have served as a war memorial until Memorial Hall was constructed downtown in 1903.

By the 1920s, cremation had gained popularity as an alternative to burial. Frank B. Gibson was commissioned to design a crematory addition for the chapel. The first cremation occurred on October 20, 1921. After the crematory opened, the cemetery board of trustees decided to change the name to Greenwood Cemetery. On August 28, 2012, the chapel and crematory was recognized by the National Park Service with a listing on the National Register of Historic Places.

== Notable burials ==
- Ross Barnes, baseball player
- William Bebb, 19th governor of Ohio
- James Henry Breasted, archaeologist
- John T. Buckbee, U.S. Representative
- Stan Campbell, football player
- Edward F. W. Ellis, member of California State Assembly
- Julia Lathrop, social reformer
- William Lathrop, U.S. Representative
- John Henry Manny, inventor
- Anna Peck Sill, educator
- Loyd Wheaton, Medal of Honor recipient
