= William Brown (Illinois politician) =

American politician

Member of the Illinois House of Representatives from the 55th district
- In office 1864 – 1866
- Preceded by: Seiden M. Church
- Succeeded by: Abram I. Enoch

Personal details
- Born: June 1, 1819 Cumberland, England
- Died: January 15, 1891 (aged 71) Rockford, Illinois
- Party: Republican
- Profession: lawyer

William Brown (June 1, 1819 – January 15, 1891) was an English American businessman and politician. He served one term in the Illinois House of Representatives from 1864 to 1866, then was elected mayor of Rockford, Illinois for one term. Brown was elected to the Illinois Circuit Courts in 1870 and served there until his death in 1891.

== Biography ==
William Brown was born in Cumberland, England on June 1, 1819. He immigrated with his family to Oneida County, New York, United States in 1827. Brown studied law in Rome, New York and was admitted to the bar. He moved to Rockford, Illinois on November 10, 1846. Initially a public school teacher, Brown was soon elected a justice of the peace. In 1852, Brown was elected state's attorney for Winnebago, Stephenson, and Jo Daviess Counties, serving three years.

At the expiration of his term, he was elected mayor of Rockford, serving one year. He was named agent for the Galena and Chicago Union Railroad in 1857. From 1857 to 1860, he practiced law with future United States Representative William Lathrop. Brown then partnered with H. W. Taylor until 1870. From 1861 to 1865, he served as Rockford School Inspector. In 1864, Brown was elected as a Republican to the Illinois House of Representatives, serving one two-year term from the 55th district. Brown was elected judge in 1870 to fill a vacancy on the Illinois Circuit Courts created by the promotion of Benjamin R. Sheldon to the Illinois Supreme Court. He was re-elected to this post in every election until his death, serving 20 years.

Brown married Caroline H. Miller, the daughter of Horace Miller, on September 19, 1850. Their eldest son, Edward W., was thrice elected mayor of Rockford. They also had a son, Frank R., and a daughter, May. Brown attended the Centennial Methodist Church in Haight Village. He was chairman of the board and president for the Rockford Hospital from 1884 to 1886. Brown died on January 15, 1891. The William Brown Building, under construction at the time, was named in his honor.
