= West Downtown Rockford Historic District =

Historic district in Illinois, United States

- U.S. National Register of Historic Places
- U.S. Historic district
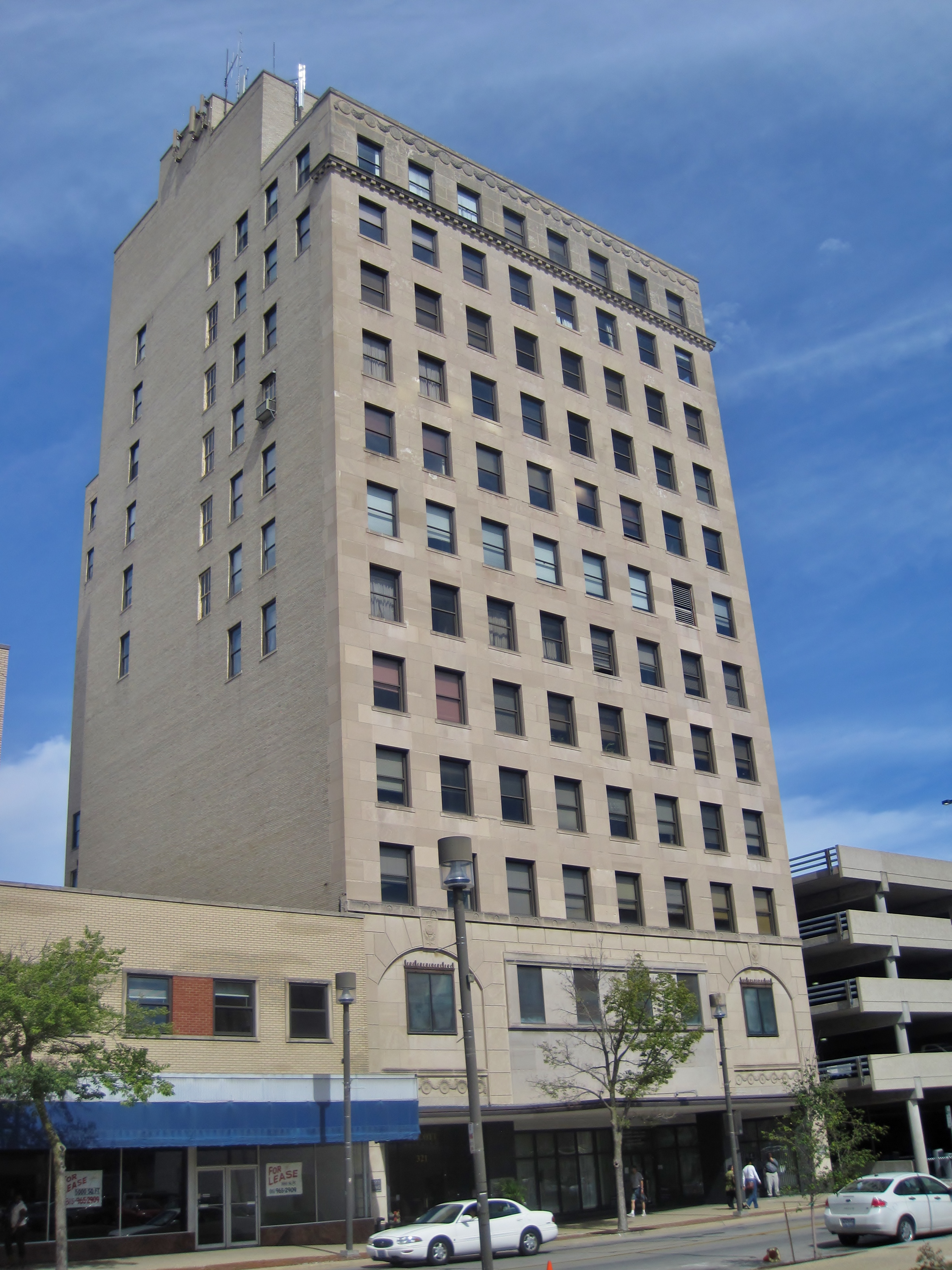
- The Talcott Building was completed in 1927.

- Location within Illinois Location within the United States
- Location: Roughly bounded by Park Ave., State St., Church St., and Wyman St., Rockford, Illinois
- Coordinates: 42.27224°N 89.09382°W
- Area: 16 acres (6.5 ha)
- Architect: Daniel Burnham, Graham, Anderson, Probst & White
- Architectural style: Italianate, Classical Revival, Art Deco
- NRHP reference No.: 07000899
- Added to NRHP: September 5, 2007

The West Downtown Rockford Historic District is a set of forty-four buildings in Rockford, Illinois, United States that reflect the downtown district of the city west of the Rock River. Of these buildings, forty-one contribute to the historical significance of the district.

== History ==
Rockford, Illinois was first settled in 1834 when Germanicus Kent established Kentville on the west side of the Rock River. Kent opened a blacksmith shop, bank, general store, and hotel near what is now State and Madison Streets. The first ferry across the river opened in 1836 and the first bridge was completed in 1845. Rockford quickly became an important commercial center because it sat approximately halfway between the cities of Chicago and Galena. The early 1850s saw the creation of the Rockford Waterpower District, an industrial area that took advantage of the first permanent dam on the river, and a connection to the Galena and Chicago Union Railroad.

Rockford incorporated in 1852; at the time, settlement was split relatively evenly on both sides of the river (151 houses on the east, 126 houses on the west). To keep up with the growing population, local businessmen replaced wood frame buildings with more permanent brick and stone structures. The Chick House, which opened in 1857, is one of the oldest remaining buildings in the district. West side development was encouraged with the completion of the Rockford Street Railway in 1880.

In the 1880s, the west side district overtook the east side as the principal commercial center of the city. John R. Porter established a successful pharmacy that stayed in business for over a hundred years. The D. J. Stewart & Company building on South Main Street hosted the Rockford Department Store until it moved into a new Romanesque Revival building in 1893. The Panic of 1893 halted downtown development for another decade. The Soldiers and Sailors Memorial Hall was dedicated by President Theodore Roosevelt on July 3, 1903. Daniel Burnham designed the 1905 Rockford Trust Building in the Chicago School motif.

The Roaring Twenties brought great prosperity to the west side district. The Forest City National Bank Building was completed in 1923. The tallest building in Rockford, the Talcott Building, was finished in 1927. Also that year, the Coronado Theatre first opened to audiences. Porter's Corner, home of the Porter pharmacy, was rebuilt in 1929 in the Art Deco style. A two-story Art Deco building was constructed next door, once housing a J. C. Penney department store.

The Great Depression and World War II stalled development in the 1930s and 1940s. S. H. Kress & Co., a five and dime, and the Times Theater were among the only developments in those decades. The Central Union Telephone Company building, originally built around 1915, replaced its faced in 1942. The construction of Interstate 90 in the 1950s, which bypassed the commercial center of Rockford, greatly harmed its chances of economic recovery. The national decline in manufacturing jobs caused the Rockford unemployment rate to skyrocket to 25.5 percent by January 1983.

=== Historical recognition and preservation ===
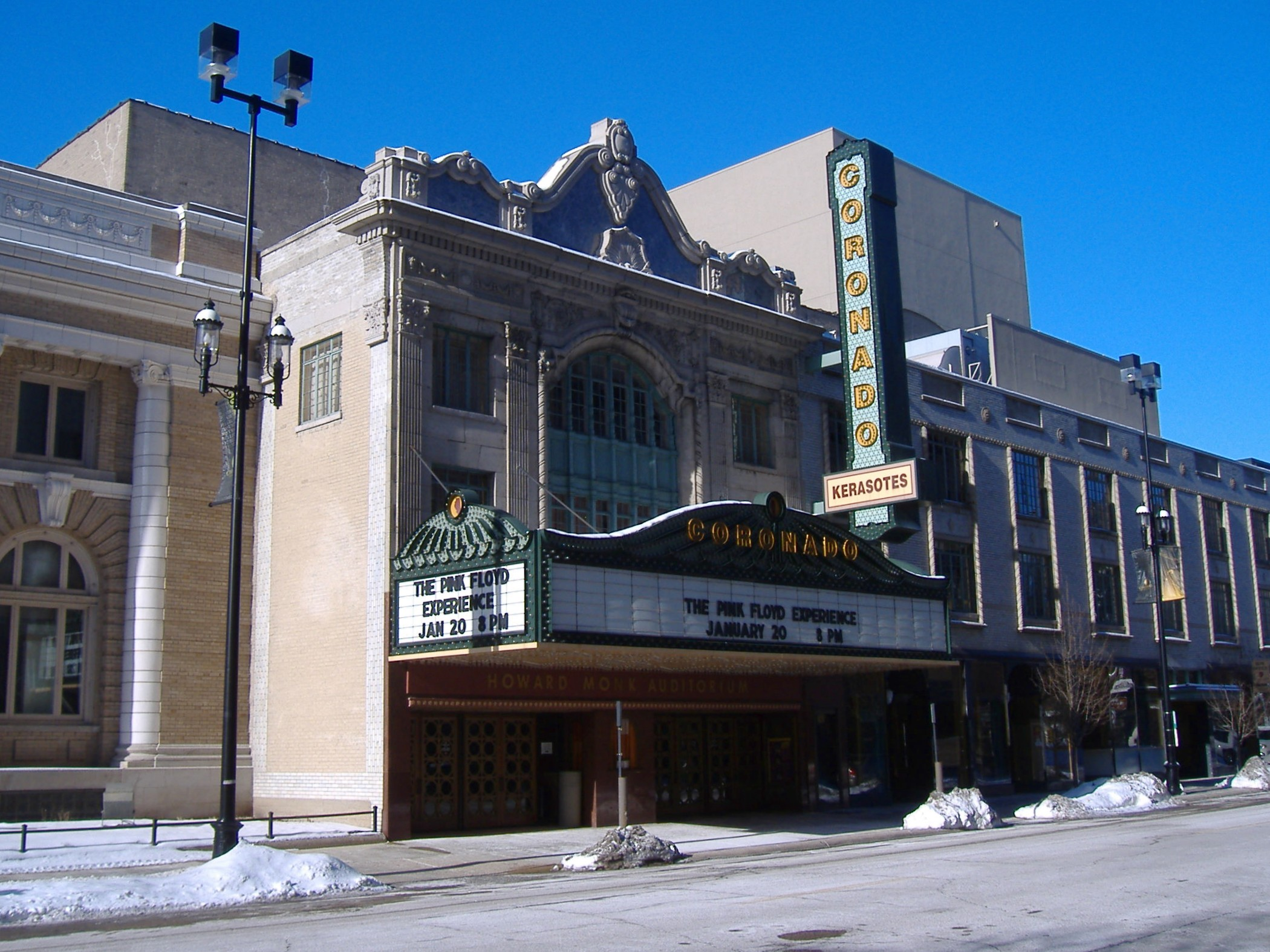
The Coronado Theatre was individually listed on the National Register in 1979.

Individual structures within the district were recognized by the National Park Service with listings on the National Register of Historic Places. Memorial Hall was the first such building, recognized in 1976. The Coronado followed in 1979. A task force was created in 1986 to preserve the deteriorating west downtown district. The Chick House was recognized in 1997, the Rockford Morning Star Building in 1999, the William Brown Building in 2000, and the Rockford Elk's Lodge #64 in 2005. On September 5, 2007, the West Downtown Rockford Historic District was recognized as a historic district. There are forty-four buildings in the district, and all but three contribute to its historic integrity. The historical period most represented by the district is 1923 through 1930.
