= Edward F. W. Ellis =

Edward Fortescue Warrington Ellis, Sr. (April 15, 1819 – April 6, 1862) was a politician, lawyer and American Civil War officer who died while leading his unit on the first day of the Battle of Shiloh. He was a representative in the state of California Legislature, and a Freemason, having served as Worshipful Master of the lodge he belonged to until 1860.

== Early life and career ==
Ellis was born in Jay, Maine. He moved to Felicity, Ohio, in 1838, where he was a lawyer and a school teacher. He married Harriet Ortus on October 25, 1842. Harriet and Ellis had three daughters, who all died during childhood. However, Harriet died soon after the birth of their third child in February 1845. On August 2, 1845, Ellis married one of his former students, Lucy Ann Dobbyns. While in Felicity, he served as both the Clerk to the Trustees and, later, the School Examiner for Franklin Township.

Ellis joined the California gold rush and he went to Nevada City, California, and tried to set up shop as a retail salesman, prospector and lawyer. In 1851, he was elected to the California State Assembly, where one of the resolutions he sponsored granted women the right to own property in the state of California. Ellis returned to Felicity, where in 1852, he and Lucy had the first of their children, Clara Blanche Ellis Starr, who would go on in her own right as a social leader of the city of Rockford, Illinois.

While living in California, he met two businessmen from Rockford, Charles Spafford and Dr. D.G. Clark, who invited him to move to that city. Ellis did not move to Rockford until 1854 (or 55), where he would establish himself as a lawyer. His home was on West State between Avon & Tay Streets in West Rockford.

Ellis joined Spafford, Charles Church and Clark in establishing a bank, the Spafford, Clark and Ellis Banking and Exchange Company, while he practiced law in Rockford. He was instrumental in establishing the first fire department in Rockford in 1855, where he was named the first chief engineer.

== Civil War ==
Ellis was involved with several local Rockford militia and cadet corps, including the one organized by Col. Elmer Ellsworth, considered the first person killed in the American Civil War. Ellsworth was a personal friend of future President Abraham Lincoln and founder of the Zouave Movement, popular during and before the Civil War. Ellis became the company commander of the 'Ellis Rifles', Company C, 15th Illinois Infantry, before being elected a lieutenant colonel and later the commander of that regiment.

Ellis volunteered for duty and was mustered in the 15th Regiment, 2nd Brigade, 4th Division of the Army of the Tennessee, in Freeport, Illinois. The 15th Regiment saw action at Fort Donelson near Clarksville, Tennessee, before action during the Battle of Shiloh. On April 6, 1862, while in the Hornet's Nest, having been promoted to the rank of acting colonel, Ellis was struck multiple times by enemy fire, but he continued to direct his troops until a fatal bullet hit him. After the battle, his body was recovered from the battlefield, and his remains were shipped to Rockford for burial. After an elaborate funeral service, Ellis was buried in the family plot that he had bought only a few years earlier after the death of one of his daughters.

== Memorialization ==
Ellis was a longtime member of Freemasonry, having been a member of Felicity Lodge #102, Orion Chapter #42 Royal Arch Masons, Connell Council #18 Royal & Select Masons, Lafayette Lodge F. & A.M. (in Nevada, California, part of the Grand Lodge of Wisconsin), Nevada Lodge #13 F. & A.M., and a founding member of the Star of the East Lodge #166 A.F. & A.M., which is still in existence. The E.F.W. Ellis Lodge #633 is named in tribute to Ellis and meets in the same building as the Star of the East Lodge.

The Ellis Arts Academy, an elementary school within the Rockford School District, is named after him. There has been a public elementary school building named after Ellis since the first one named for him in 1868, and that first Ellis School building existed until 2020, and was formerly the nucleus of the (St Thomas) Bishop Muldoon Catholic High School and was part of the west side location of the Crusader's Clinic healthcare organization. The area around the school is commonly known informally as Ellis Park. Both Ellis Street in San Francisco, California, and Ellis Street in the city of Rockford are named for Ellis.

The Ellis family plot is directly adjacent to the NorthMain Street side of the Greenwood Cemetery offices. His gravestone is inscribed: "Ellis, Edward F.W., Lieutenant Colonel in the 15th Regiment Ill Vol, Killed in Action during the battle of Shiloh". His wife, Lucy, is buried next to him with other members of his family in the plot.

His uniform and sword were on display at the Winnebago County War Memorial building in downtown Rockford, across the street from the Main Library, for several years. However, these items are not currently on display because their location is unknown.

== See also ==
- Rockford, Illinois
- Battle of Shiloh
- Memorial Hall (Rockford, Illinois)
- Shiloh National Military Park
