= Charlotte Thompson Reid =

American politician (1913–2007)

Charlotte Reid
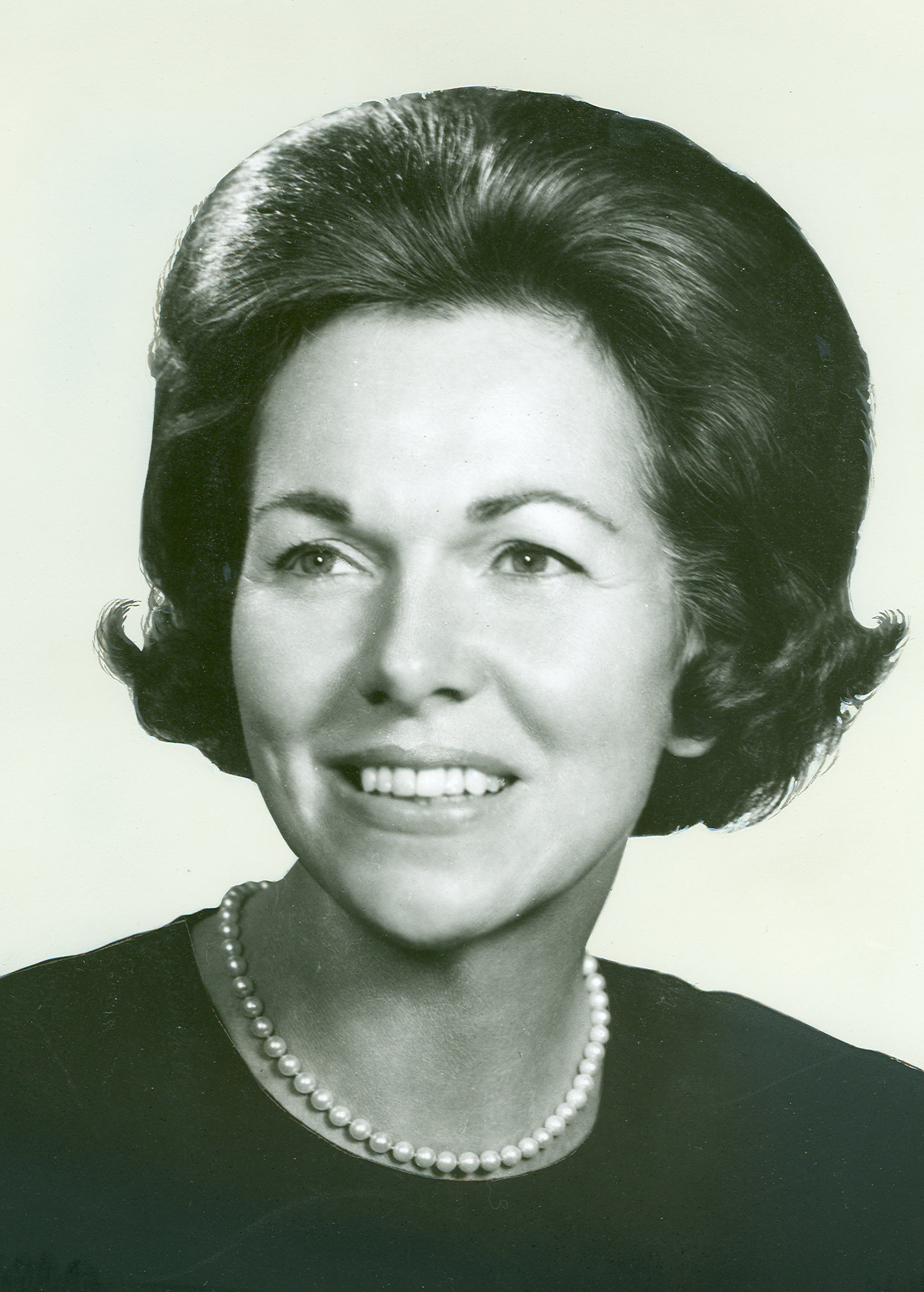

Member of the U.S. House of Representatives from Illinois's 15th district
- In office January 3, 1963 – October 7, 1971
- Preceded by: Noah M. Mason
- Succeeded by: Cliffard D. Carlson

Personal details
- Born: Charlotte Leota Thompson; September 27, 1913 Kankakee, Illinois, U.S.
- Died: January 25, 2007 (aged 93) Aurora, Illinois, U.S.
- Party: Republican
- Spouse: Frank Reid (m. 1938; died 1962)
- Children: 4
- Education: Illinois College (attended)

Charlotte Thompson Reid (September 27, 1913 – January 25, 2007) was an American politician who served as a U.S. representative for Illinois from 1963 to 1971 and as the commissioner of the Federal Communications Commission from 1971 to 1976. She was a member of the Republican Party.

== Family and early life ==
Charlotte Leota Thompson attended Aurora, Illinois public schools and Illinois College. Early in her career she was a featured vocalist on the NBC radio program Breakfast Club with Don McNeill; she appeared under the professional name of "Annette King".

On January 1, 1938, Charlotte Thompson married Frank R. Reid Jr. He died in 1962. She was the mother of four children including Illinois State Representative Patricia Reid Lindner.

== Member of U.S. House ==
Charlotte's husband Frank sought to follow in the footsteps of his father, Frank R. Reid, who served six terms in Congress as a U.S. Representative from Illinois. In 1962 Frank Jr. won the Republican nomination, beating out eight others for the seat, only to die in August before he could run in the regular election. Because of Charlotte's involvement in her husband's campaign, she was appointed to run in his place. She won election to Congress from the 15th District of Illinois in November 1962, and was the only new woman member of congress elected that year. Her first Congress, the 88th, contained 12 female Representatives and two female Senators. Reid was re-elected for four successive terms.

Her initial assignments were on the Committee on Interior and Insular Affairs and the Committee on Public Works. Reid also served on the House Republican Policy Committee and the Committee on Standards of Official Conduct.

Reid's committee assignments also included the Committee on Appropriations, where she was appointed to two of its Subcommittees: Foreign Operations, and Labor-Health, Education and Welfare. Reid served as one of the first six Congressional members on the Board of Governors of the John F. Kennedy Center for the Performing Arts, and served on the Board of Governors of the Capitol Hill Club. She addressed the 1964 Republican National Convention in San Francisco and the 1968 Republican National Convention in Miami. She was the only member of Congress from Illinois to vote against the Civil Rights Act of 1964. Reid later voted in favor of the Voting Rights Act of 1965 and the Civil Rights Act of 1968.

In 1965, during her second term, Reid paid for her own trip to Vietnam to speak with her constituents from Illinois, including 23 men on an aircraft carrier in the China Sea. When she returned she contacted their families. Reid said that the experience was "one of the most gratifying things that happened to me in Congress."

In 1968, Reid became the first woman to deliver a State of the Union response.

In 1969, Reid became the first woman to wear pants on the floor of the House of Representatives.

== After Congress: life and honors ==
Reid left Congress in 1971, in the middle of her fifth term, to become a Commissioner of the Federal Communications Commission from October 8, 1971 to July 1, 1976. She was only the second woman to be appointed to the agency in its 37-year history. While on the FCC, she served as the Commissioner of Defense, focused on emergency preparedness and defense mobilization.

After leaving government in 1976, Reid was involved with both public and private boards:

- Board member of Liggett Group (1977–1981)
- Board member of Motorola (1978–1983)
- Board member of Midatlantic Bank of New Jersey (1978–1985)
- Board of Defense Advisory Committee on Women in the Services (DACOWITS) (1982–1984)
- Presidential Task Force on International Private Enterprise (1985–1987)
- Board of Governors of the Hoover Institution at Stanford University (1982–1989)

Honorary degrees included Doctor of Laws from John Marshall Law School, Illinois College, and Aurora University.

== See also ==
- Women in the United States House of Representatives

U.S. House of Representatives
Preceded by Noah M. Mason	Member of the U.S. House of Representatives from Illinois's 15th congressional district 1963–1971	Succeeded by Cliffard D. Carlson
Party political offices
Preceded by Everett Dirksen; Gerald Ford	Response to the State of the Union address 1968; Served alongside: Howard Baker, George H. W. Bush, Peter H. Dominick, Gerald Ford, Robert P. Griffin, Thomas Kuchel, Melvin Laird, Bob Mathias, George Murphy, Richard Harding Poff, Charles H. Percy, Al Quie, Hugh Scott, William A. Steiger, John Tower	Vacant Title next held by Donald M. Fraser, Henry M. Jackson, Mike Mansfield, John William McCormack, Patsy Mink, Edmund Muskie, William Proxmire
