= Rockford Elk's Lodge No. 64 =

- Rockford Elk's Lodge #64
- U.S. National Register of Historic Places
- U.S. Historic district – Contributing property
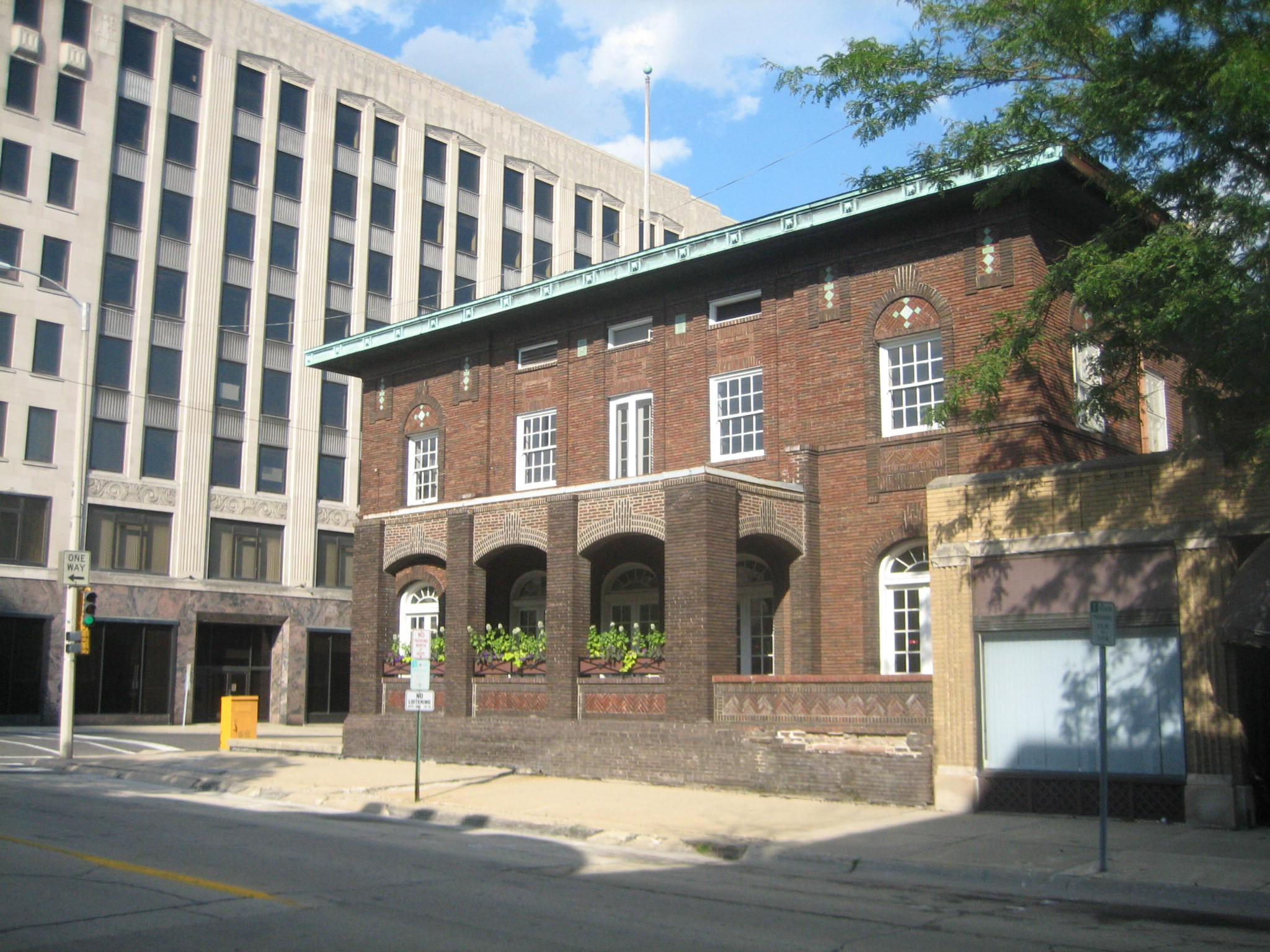

- Location within Illinois Location within the United States
- Location: 210 W. Jefferson; Rockford, Illinois
- Coordinates: 42°16′30″N 89°5′35″W
- Area: less than one acre
- Built: 1912
- Built by: W. H. Cook
- Architect: Lawrence P. Buck
- Demolished: February 16th, 2026
- Part of: West Downtown Rockford Historic District (ID07000899)
- NRHP reference No.: 05000113
- Added to NRHP: February 28, 2005

Rockford Elk's Lodge #64 was a historic building in Rockford, Illinois, United States originally used by a chapter of the Benevolent and Protective Order of Elks. It was individually listed on the National Register of Historic Places and is also part of the West Downtown Rockford Historic District. The building was demolished on February 16, 2026, due to its poor condition.

== History ==
The first Benevolent and Protective Order of Elks chapter in Rockford, Illinois was founded in 1887. They met until they disbanded in 1893. In 1901, the group re-organized and was granted a charter as lodge #64 the next year. They originally met in the Winnebago Lodge Room of the Nelson House hotel. In 1908, Phillip Smith appointed a committee to examine the possibility of constructing a permanent home for the organization. In February of the next year, the lodge purchased the lot at the corner of North Main and Peach (now Jefferson) Streets.

Lawrence P. Buck of Chicago was selected as the architect; it is unknown why he was chosen. It was constructed over seventeen months, opening on February 7, 1913. An addition was built in 1929 to house a swimming pool, gymnasium, dining room, and bachelor quarters. The lodge used the building until 1990, when it was sold due to dwindling membership. It sat vacant for fourteen years, when it was donated to The Abilities Center, Goodwill Industries. The building was recognized by the National Park Service with a listing on the National Register of Historic Places on February 28, 2005. On September 5, 2007, the building was also listed as a contributing property to the West Downtown Rockford Historic District.

Goodwill industries sold the property to Argyle Properties in 2011, and despite many proposals for its adaptive reuse, the building continued to sit vacant and deteriorate. The city government began legal action against the property owner for code violations, and by 2022 a judge ordered that the owner must make repairs or pay for demolition. Despite efforts to save the building, the city went through with the demolition on February 16, 2026.
