= Anna Peck Sill =

American educator (1816–1889)

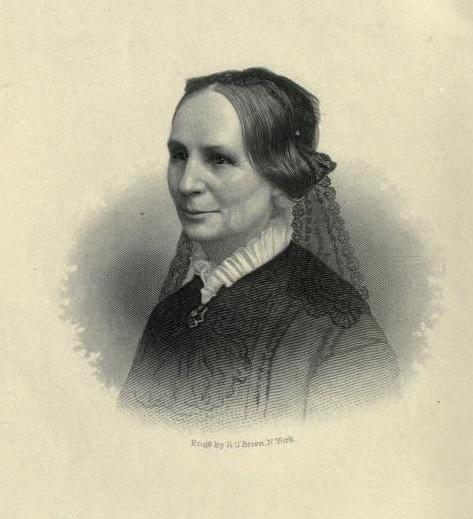
- Born: August 9, 1816; Burlington, New York, USA
- Died: June 18, 1889 (aged 72); Rockford, Illinois, USA
- Resting place: West Side Cemetery, Rockford
- Occupation: Educator
- Years active: 45
- Known for: Founder of Rockford Female Seminary (now Rockford University)
- Relatives: Jedediah Peck (grandfather)

Anna Peck Sill (August 9, 1816 – June 18, 1889) was an American educator and the founder of Rockford Female Seminary (now Rockford University), a school for the Christian education of young women in Rockford, Illinois, as an adjunct to Beloit College of Beloit, Wisconsin. Sill took inspiration from Mary Lyon and modeled the Rockford school after Mount Holyoke Seminary. Sill retired in 1884, after 35 years as Rockford's principal, five thousand women having graduated under her.

== Early life and education ==
Anna Peck Sill was born in Burlington, New York, on August 9, 1816. She was the youngest of ten children, and inherited the intellectual and moral qualities of a long line of Puritan ancestry.

Sill's family descended from one John Sill, who, with his wife Joanna, emigrated from England to Cambridge, Massachusetts in 1637, seven years after the town was settled.

Sill's paternal grandfather, Deacon Andrew Sill, was a prominent member of the Congregational Church in Lyme, Connecticut, and held the office of deacon for 31 years. He was a Patriot soldier in the Revolutionary War. About 1789, Sill's grandparents moved with their families from Lyme to Otsego County, New York, at that time a wilderness, and settled in the neighborhood of what is now Burlington.

Sill's maternal grandfather, Hon. Jedediah Peck, filled several high positions as legislator and judge in New York State. He was the first to urge legislative action on the establishment of common schools and the abolition of imprisonment for debt. He was also a teacher and was skilled in the sciences of navigation and surveying.

Sill's mother, Hephzibah Sill, was the eldest daughter of Judge Peck and was known as a good scholar in her day, particularly skilled in mathematics. She died in 1860. Sill's father, Abel Sill, was a farmer. He died of typhoid fever in 1824, at the age of 50, when Anna was seven years old. His death left Sill's mother to care for their nine living children: six sons and three daughters, of whom Anna was the youngest.

Sill was sent to school at the age of four, attending a schoolhouse an arduous 1 mile (1.6 km) walk from her home. There, she was drilled in Webster's Spelling Book, Morse's Geography, and Murray's Grammar, which she "committed from beginning to end with no thought of its value, or scarcely of its meaning". Daboll's Arithmetic was finished when about thirteen years old, "with the aid of a key". She was taught "reverence to teachers and to all strangers by the way to and from school". She was carefully trained in household duties, including spinning, weaving, and setting cards for carding wool and tow. She also found time for embroidery, and to braid bonnets made from Junegrass.

Sill's father was Episcopal in preference, and one of the first books she recalled reading aside from the Bible was the Book of Common Prayer.

== Career ==
=== Western New York ===
She left Burlington in the fall of 1836, when about 20 years of age, and taught at a district school in Barre, New York for about seven months. Sill devoted the time between her school hours to other employments such as spinning and weaving to eke out her slender wages of US$2 per week and obtain means to support her further education. In November 1837, Sill entered Phipps Union Female Seminary in Albion, New York, one of the first female institutions in the state, as a permanent scholar. About a year later, Sill was employed by the seminary as a teacher, where she would remain until July 1843, likely pursuing her studies simultaneously.

Sill was inclined early in life toward the foreign missionary field, but by the time an opportunity came for her to travel to India, she had become convinced that her mission was, in part, to prepare others for the field instead. Sill's thoughts turned towards missionary work and education in the Northwest Territory, and she wrote to her acquaintance, Rev. Hiram Foote, in Racine, Wisconsin, to ask if he knew of any openings for such work, saying, "I have thought perhaps I might be useful as a teacher, and if possible establish a female seminary in some of the western states. Pecuniary considerations would have but little influence in such an undertaking. My principal object is to do good."

Not receiving any favorable reply from Foote, Sill traveled alone to Warsaw, New York, and after many discouragements, succeeded in opening a seminary for young ladies on October 2, 1843. This undertaking would be the first seminary entirely under her own control, and by the end of the year, the seminary numbered 140 scholars. Sill ultimately closed the seminary in March 1846.

In August 1846, after thinking through whether to travel West or to offer herself to the foreign missionary field, she was invited by the trustees of the Cary Collegiate Institute in Oakfield, New York to take charge of the institution's female department. Sill accepted the invitation and taught there until the spring of 1849. Though little record exists of Sill's work at Cary Collegiate Institute, the school was described as "prosperous". While there, Sill received many offers to work elsewhere, including one to take charge of the seminary in Albion where she had taught previously, but she chose to remain in Oakfield another year. During this time, she continued to receive offers, all of which she declined as she desired to labor in a more "destitute" field; if not as a foreign missionary, then in the Northwest Territory.

=== Northern Illinois ===
While Sill was still employed in New York, pioneers of Christian education in the Northwest Territory were planning the establishment of college institutions of the New England type in order to carry out their views of higher education for young men and women. Co-education had not at that time proved a complete success; nor was the idea of furnishing the same education for both sexes then considered. The divide in the sphere of life and employment opportunities between the sexes required a different curriculum of study and methods of training, for which separate institutions were demanded. Accordingly, they resolved after a series of conventions, representing especially the Congregational and Presbyterian ministers and churches of the Northwest, to establish a college in Beloit, Wisconsin, and a seminary in Northern Illinois. This seminary was to be located in Rockford, and a board of trustees was elected to whom was committed the development and care of both institutions. The college began its corporate existence in 1845, and the seminary in 1847, although it did not open until a few years later.

Friends of the enterprise in Rockford who had heard of Sill's success and reputation as a teacher, including Rev. L. H. Loss, then pastor of the Congregational Church, wrote to Sill concerning the new venture and invited her to come to Rockford and open a school for young ladies, intended as preparatory to the future seminary.

Sill accepted the invitation, left the Cary Collegiate Institute on May 10, 1849, and reached Rockford on May 24. Her motives for accepting included her belief that it was a larger field of usefulness than any she had heretofore occupied, laying Christian foundations for future generations. On May 29, she sent an advertisement for the school to the press. School commenced on July 11, opening with 53 scholars, and the following day, there were 60. They at first held recitations in the city's old courthouse building.

Discouragements to Sill's efforts were manifold, but she persisted. Sill opened a modest boarding house, and with the funds earned, she improved the schoolroom, bought the books needed, and prevailed upon the students to supply desks.

The school was an immediate success and soon outgrew its accommodations, demonstrating the growing demand for higher female education in the West. The citizens of Rockford subscribed over US$5,000 for new buildings, and a pledge by the women of US$1,000 more for the grounds, together with the school in such successful operation, provided the funds for its inauguration as a permanent institution.

In 1851, the first class, fifteen in number, entered upon their course. In July 1852, Sill was elected principal. She was inspired by the educational work of Mary Lyon, and set Mount Holyoke Seminary as the model after which the Rockford seminary was to be built. The aims, methods, spirit, and character of the former were adopted by the latter.

In June 1852, the cornerstone of the first seminary building was laid, and it was completed in the fall of 1853. It was at once filled to overflowing, with some four or five students occupying a single boarding room, and about 100 applications had to be refused. Rockford's local resources seemed exhausted, and further means for enlargement had to be obtained, or the enterprise would fail. Sill's health suffered under the accumulating pressure, and she traveled East in December 1853, for the dual purpose of improving her health and conducting fundraising. She visited Boston, Massachusetts, as well as other centers of wealth and influence, and returned to Rockford in the summer of 1854, having secured some US$5,000. With this, the foundation of another building was laid, but the building was erected slowly with borrowed money to complete it, the debt being secured by a mortgage on the property.

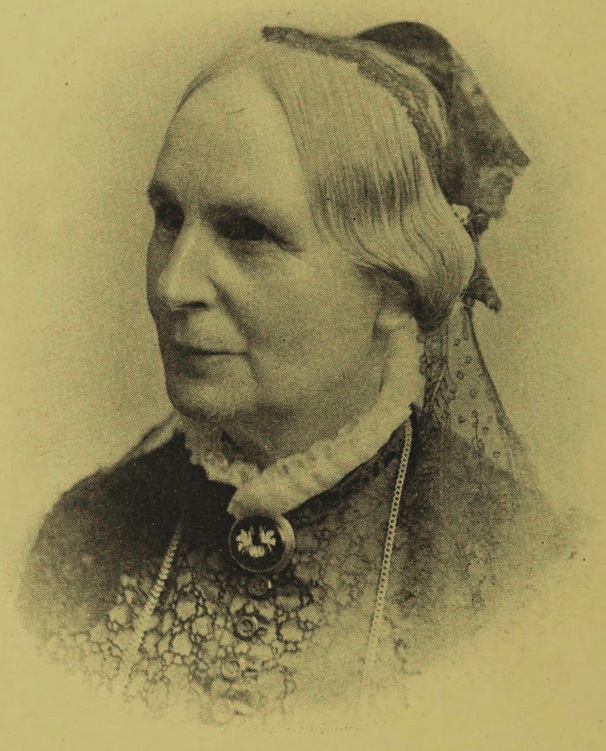
(undated)

Repeated efforts were made to raise funds in the West, and the amount of US$10,000 was ultimately pledged to be paid in annual installments, a large portion of which Sill secured through personal efforts. Appeals were sent to friends of Christian education, and Sill again visited New England to secure funds for the completion of another building, a chapel with connecting wings.

While responsible for the business issues of the institution, Sill not only continued in her role as both principal and instructor, but also took an active, and often leading, social and religious role in the community. Sill regularly attended meetings of the Church, taught a Bible class in the Sunday school, and mingled in the community, contributing her personal influence. Through Sill's efforts, an education society was formed by the women of Rockford as a form of Christian benevolence for those who were eager to be educated but could not afford to pay for it.

== Later life ==
In the summer of 1884, after 35 years of leadership, Sill resigned her position as principal and retired to the position of Principal Emerita. The means for such a transition had been prepared for her by her pupils. Several years prior, the alumnæ of the seminary had raised, by subscription among themselves and the aid of other friends of the seminary, a fund of US$10,000, which was afterwards increased to US$12,000. The fund was named the Sill Endowment Fund, the income of which was to be appropriated to support Sill during her life, and afterwards to the endowment of the chair of the Principal of the Seminary. Sill's rooms in the seminary were reserved for her exclusive use and occupancy so long as she might live, or desire it.

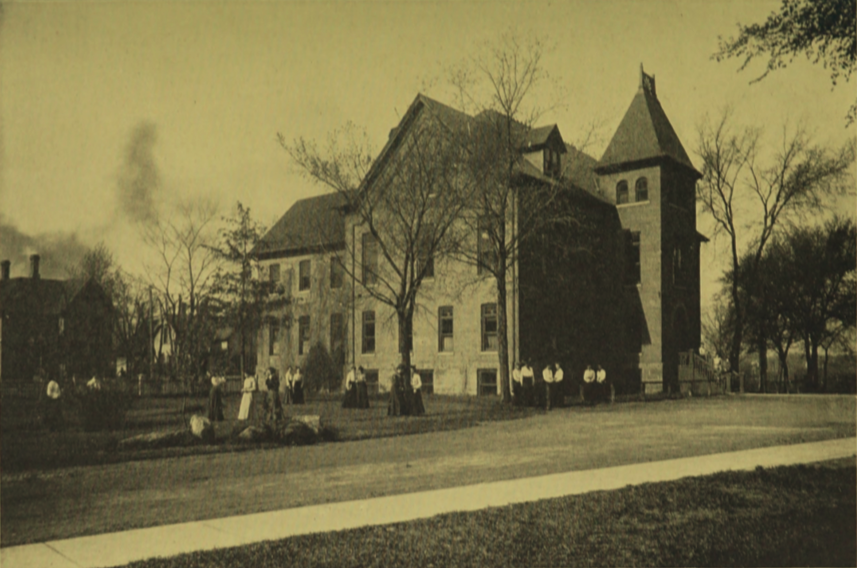
Sill Hall (1904)

Sill accepted her retirement gracefully. She had taken much interest in the growth of the art department, and some of her friends proposed to her a European tour for recreation, health, and collecting pictures for an art gallery, but the travel did not occur, Sill giving herself to more quiet, domestic endeavors. However, another department which she had long hoped to see provided for, a gymnasium, was erected and named Sill Hall.

In the spring of 1889, Sill's last surviving brother, his wife, and their two children died of pneumonia within a few weeks of each other. Soon after, Sill experienced a slight attack of the same disease while on a visit to her niece, Mrs. A. M. Chapman, in Ridgeland Township, Illinois, where Sill often stayed when away from Rockford. She rallied from the illness at first, but by June, she had returned to her rooms at the Rockford seminary under the advice of her physician. On "Founder's Day", June 11, she stayed in her room and did not go to the chapel for the evening service, but instead went to bed early. She never got out of bed thereafter, the pneumonia having returned. She spoke little while ill during her last eight days.

Anna Peck Sill died in her room in the seminary on June 18, 1889. Her funeral was held in the seminary chapel, and she was interred in the West Side Cemetery in Rockford.
