= George E. Adams =

American politician

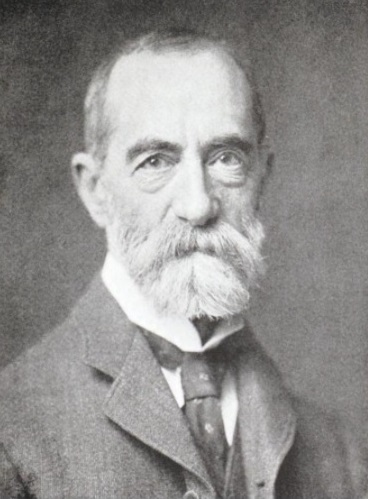
- From 1924's The Chicago Symphony Orchestra: Its Organization, Growth, and Development, 1891-1924

Member of the U.S. House of Representatives from Illinois's 4th district
- In office March 4, 1883 – March 3, 1891
- Preceded by: John C. Sherwin
- Succeeded by: Walter C. Newberry

Personal details
- Born: George Everett Adams; June 18, 1840 Keene, New Hampshire, U.S.
- Died: October 5, 1917 (aged 77) Chicago, Illinois, U.S.
- Resting place: Pine Hill Cemetery
- Party: Republican
- Education: Phillips Exeter Academy; Harvard University (A.B., LL.B.)
- Occupation: Lawyer, politician

Military service
- Allegiance: United States of America
- Branch/service: United States Army
- Unit: First Illinois Artillery
- Battles/wars: American Civil War

George Everett Adams (June 18, 1840 – October 5, 1917) was a U.S. representative from Illinois.

== Early years ==
Adams was born in Keene, New Hampshire, on June 18, 1840, son of Benjamin F. Adams and Louisa Redington, grandson of Benjamin Adams, and a descendant of William Adams of Ipswich, Massachusetts.

Adams moved with his parents to Chicago, Illinois, in 1853. He attended Phillips Exeter Academy, Exeter, New Hampshire, and Harvard University. He was graduated from Harvard an A.B. in 1860 and an LL.B., 1865. During the Civil War, he served in the First Illinois Artillery. After his war service, he attended Harvard Law School, was admitted to the bar in 1865 in Chicago and commenced practice of his profession in 1867.

== Career ==
He served as a member of the Illinois State Senate from 1881 until March 3, 1883, when he resigned to enter Congress.

Adams was elected as a Republican to the Forty-eighth Congress and to the three succeeding Congresses from March 4, 1883, to March 3, 1891 (49th, 50th and 51st congresses). He was an unsuccessful candidate for reelection in 1890 to the Fifty-second Congress. He was one of the founders of the Chicago Symphony Orchestra, being instrumental with a few others in securing the land in downtown Chicago where the orchestra is today. />

== Last years ==
On retiring from public life Adams continued the practice of law in Chicago until his death. He died at his summer home in Peterborough, New Hampshire, on October 5, 1917, and he was interred in Pine Hill Cemetery at Dover, New Hampshire.

== Sources ==
- Leonard, John William; Marquis, Albert Nelson, eds. (1908), Who's who in America, vol. 5, Chicago: Marquis Who's Who, Incorporated, p. 10.
- United States Congress. "George E. Adams (id: A000034)". Biographical Directory of the United States Congress. This article incorporates public domain material from Biographical Directory of the United States Congress. Federal government of the United States.

U.S. House of Representatives
Preceded by John C. Sherwin	Member of the U.S. House of Representatives from Illinois's 4th congressional district 1883-1891	Succeeded by Walter C. Newberry
