= John C. Sherwin =

American politician

Member of the U.S. House of Representatives from Illinois's 4th district
- In office March 4, 1879 – March 3, 1883
- Preceded by: William Lathrop
- Succeeded by: George E. Adams

Personal details
- Born: February 8, 1838 Gouverneur, New York, U.S.
- Died: January 1, 1904 (aged 65) Benton Harbor, Michigan, U.S.
- Party: Republican

John Crocker Sherwin (February 8, 1838 – January 1, 1904) was a U.S. representative from Illinois.

== Biography ==
Born in Gouverneur, New York, Sherwin was educated in the common schools, Gouverneur Wesleyan Seminary in New York, and Lombard College, Galesburg, Illinois, where he studied law. He was admitted to the bar and practiced. County clerk of Kane County, Illinois. He served as city attorney of Aurora, Illinois. Enlisted in the Union Army during the Civil War in Company H, Eighty-ninth Regiment, Illinois Volunteer Infantry, and served until the close of the war. He became a sergeant.

Sherwin was elected as a Republican to the Forty-sixth and Forty-seventh Congresses (March 4, 1879 – March 3, 1883). He was not a candidate for renomination in 1882. He resumed the practice of law. He died at Benton Harbor, Michigan, January 1, 1904. He was interred in Spring Lake Cemetery, Aurora, Illinois.

U.S. House of Representatives
| Preceded by William Lathrop | Member of the U.S. House of Representatives from Illinois's 4th congressional district 1879-1883 | Succeeded by George E. Adams |
