= Rockford Morning Star Building =

- U.S. National Register of Historic Places
- U.S. Historic district – Contributing property
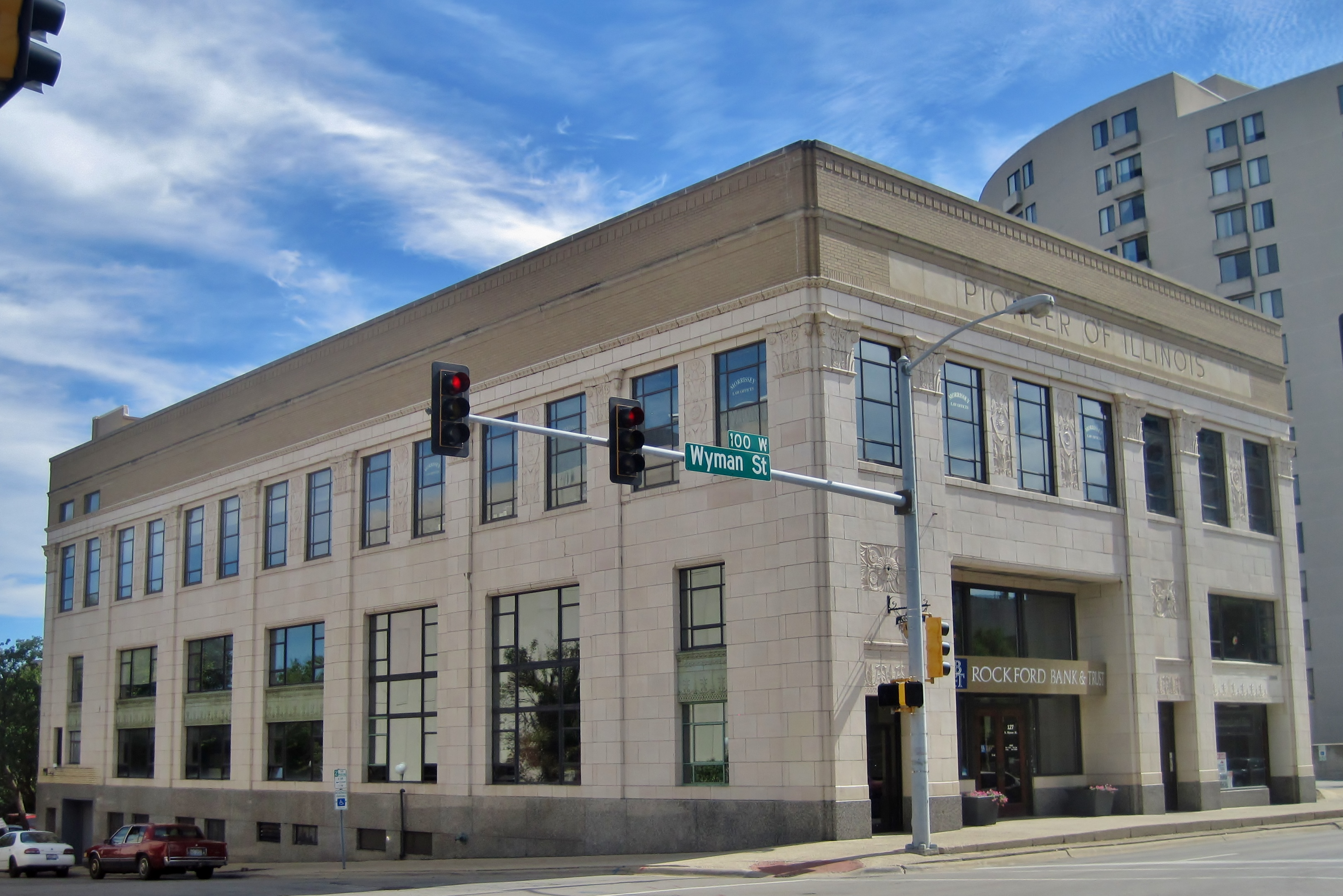

- Location within Illinois Location within the United States
- Location: 127 N. Wyman St., Rockford, Illinois
- Coordinates: 42°16′18″N 89°5′35″W
- Area: less than one acre
- Built: 1928
- Built by: Security Building Co.
- Architect: Clausen, Kruse & Klein
- Architectural style: Classical Revival, Art Deco
- Part of: West Downtown Rockford Historic District (ID07000899)
- NRHP reference No.: 99000972
- Added to NRHP: August 12, 1999

The Rockford Morning Star Building, located at 127 N. Wyman St. in Rockford, Illinois, is a historic building originally used by the Rockford Morning Star.

== Architecture ==
Built in 1927–28, the building was designed by Davenport, Iowa, architecture firm Clausen, Kruse & Klein. The firm designed the building in the Classical Revival style. The building's terra cotta exterior is segmented by pilasters with decorative capitals. Decorative panels situated near the building's entrance feature Art Deco and Egyptian elements, including rows of chevrons and a guilloché of lotus buds.

== History ==
The first newspapers in Rockford, Illinois were The Rock River Express and the Rockford Star, both first published in 1840. Both papers lasted only a year. The Winnebago Forum, renamed The Republican in 1845, was the first city paper to have a lengthy publishing period (1842-1862). The Rockford Morning Star first published in 1888. It merged with the Rockford Daily Register-Gazette in 1928. Ruth Hanna McCormick Simms purchased the paper two years later, and again split the two papers, publishing the Morning Star as a morning daily. The paper was purchased by the Gannett Company in 1967, who merged the last two remaining Rockford papers in 1979 to create the Rockford Register Star.

The Rockford Morning Star Building was constructed during negotiations for the 1928 merge. However, the building was only used for two years; after its acquisition by Simms, a new tower was built on the other side of the Rock River. The building remained in the possession of the Simms family, who leased it to the George Rogers Clark Mutual Company. It was eventually absorbed into the Pioneer Life Insurance Company. The company bought the building from the Simms family in 1946. The company moved to Schaumburg in 1993 and henceforth only used the Rockford building for storage and mailing. The company merged into Conseco, Inc. in 1996.

The building was listed on the U.S. National Register of Historic Places in 1999. It was listed as a contributing property to the West Downtown Rockford Historic District in 2007.
