= Coronado Theatre =

Theatre in Rockford, Illinois, US

Coordinates: 42°16′26″N 89°5′35″W

Coronado Performing Arts Center
- Coronado Theatre (1927-97)
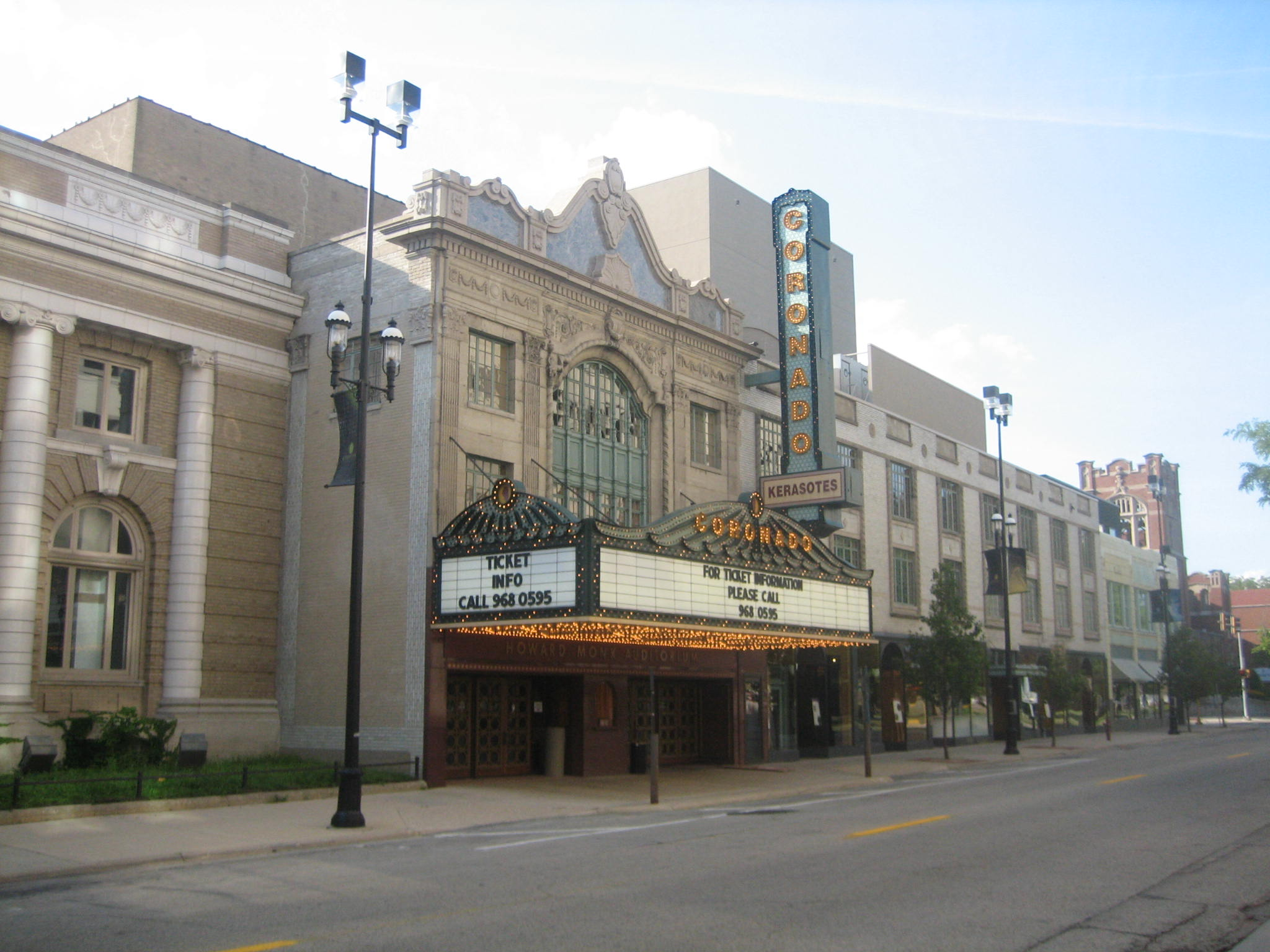
- Front entrance of theater on Main Street
- Interactive map of Coronado Performing Arts Center
- Address: 314 North Main Street; Rockford, Illinois; United States
- Capacity: 2,400
- Public transit: RMTD

Construction
- Opened: 9 October 1927
- Reopened: 2001
- Rebuilt: 1998-2001
- Years active: 1927-1997; 2001-present
- Architects: Frederic J. Klein; Bell, Walter Scott Co.

Website
- Venue Website
- Coronado Theatre
- U.S. National Register of Historic Places
- U.S. Historic district – Contributing property
- Part of: West Downtown Rockford Historic District (ID07000899)
- NRHP reference No.: 79000878
- Added to NRHP: September 6, 1979

The Coronado Performing Arts Center (originally the Coronado Theatre), in Rockford, Illinois, is a 2,400-seat theatre, designed by architect Frederic J. Klein. The theatre cost $1.5 million to build, and opened on October 9, 1927.

== Interior ==
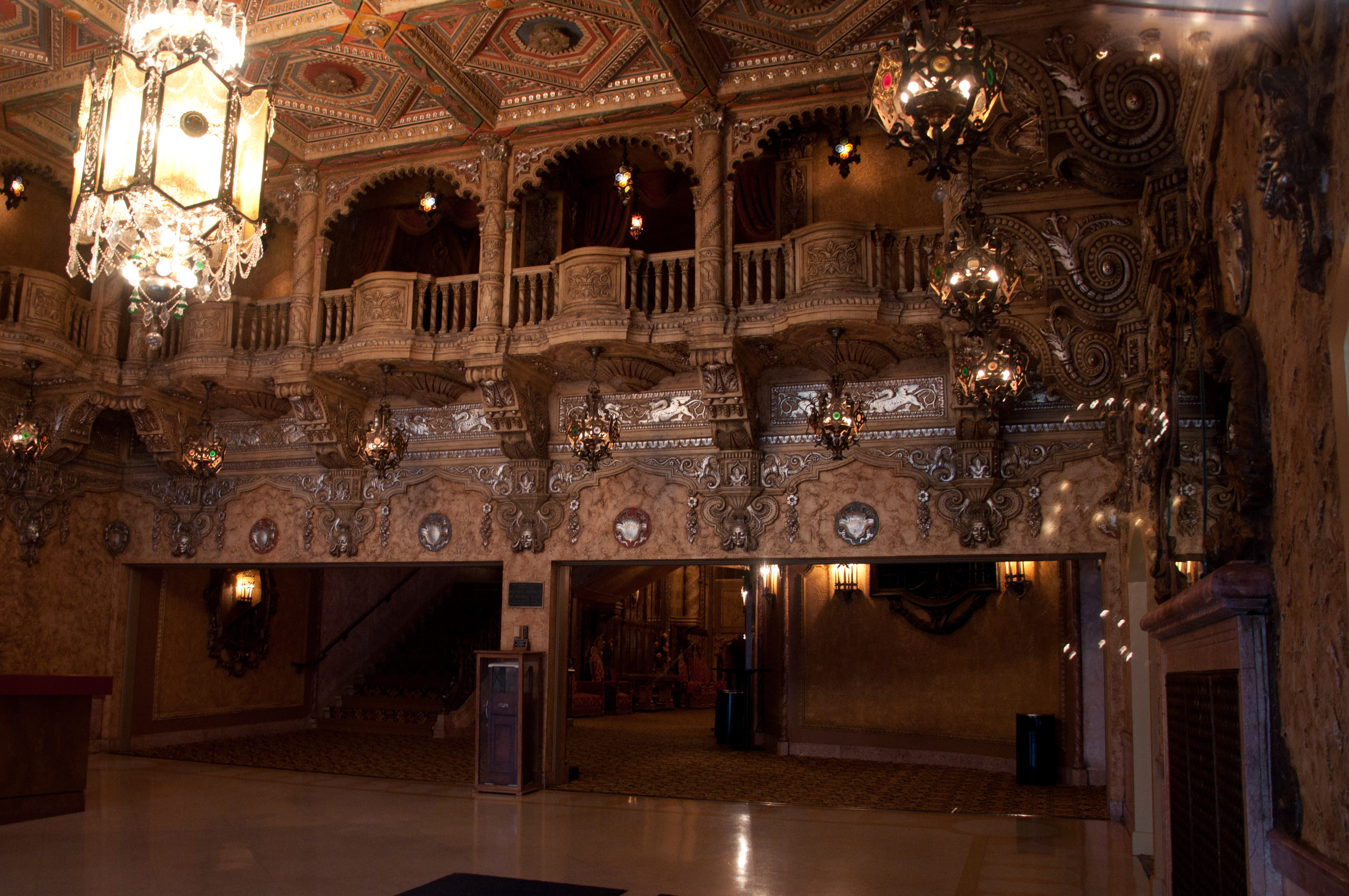
Coronado Theatre lobby

The theatre's elaborate auditorium is designed according to the atmospheric style popular in movie houses built in the 1920s. This style simulates an outdoor theater-going experience. The Coronado's auditorium walls are decorated with facades of gilded Spanish and Italian-style buildings, and the ceiling looks like a deep blue sky filled with twinkling stars and floating clouds. The auditorium is full of gilded detail. Green stained-glass lamps with fluted bulbs adorn the walls. Japanese dragons and glowing lanterns cover the organ screens on either side of the stage. Seating is on two levels, the main floor and a sizeable balcony. At the front of the theatre, in front and below the stage is an orchestra pit. Incorporated into the gilded sides of the interior of the theatre hall are several alcoves that resemble box seats along the sides, which can be accessed from the balcony level but usually do not have seats. All seats are covered with plush red velvet.

The lobby and mezzanine level are as elaborately designed as the auditorium. One of the grand mezzanine's focal points is a statue of Venus standing in front of a golden seashell. Because of its distinct interior design, the Coronado is sentimentally referred to as "Rockford's Wonder Theatre."

== Events ==
During its early years, the Coronado played host to both movies and live stage shows. Its opening show was a silent film called "Swim Girl Swim." Nearly 9,000 people flocked to the three opening-day showings.

During the theatre's heyday which lasted from its opening until the 1960s, such famous stage acts as Frank Sinatra, Judy Garland, Bob Hope, Sammy Davis Jr. & Milton Berle appeared at the Coronado. During his 1960 Presidential campaign, John F. Kennedy made a stop there. In 1984, the Coronado ceased showing movies because of a decline in revenue.

In celebration of the 2018 Illinois Bicentennial, the Coronado Theatre was selected as one of the Illinois 200 Great Places by the American Institute of Architects Illinois component (AIA Illinois).

== National landmark ==
In 1979, the Coronado was added to the National Register of Historic Places. At the dedication ceremony, it was referred to as one of the premiere theaters of its kind in the nation.

In 1980, the City of Rockford made the Coronado an historical landmark of the state of Illinois.

On 1 July 2010, the Coronado Theater was voted "the No. 1 Architectural Wonder of the United States, based on receiving the most votes in an AOL/U.S. Travel Association poll. It finished with 6,511 votes (30 percent), while the Government Bridge in Rock Island was second at 3,816 (17.6 percent). The 250-room Biltmore residence in Ashville, N.C., was third at 2,781."

== Restoration project ==
Kerasotes Theater Organization, owner of the Coronado Theatre since 1970, donated the property to the City of Rockford in 1997. Plans to preserve and renovate the theater followed immediately. The Friends of the Coronado, founded in 1998, began an $18.5 million restoration project a year later. Rockford community members supported the restoration by donating nearly half of the required funds. The project's goals were both to restore the theater's deteriorating interior and bring the building structure up-to-date. The restoration project not only preserved the existing features of the theater, it also provided the theater with more usable space. Additionally, the Coronado is now a fully handicapped accessible building. After 18 months of construction, the Coronado reopened in 2001 with a black-tie celebration.

== Grand Barton Organ ==
The Coronado is home to one of only two remaining Grand Barton Theater Organs that feature a unique dragon design. The organ is a 4 manual, 17 rank instrument that features many of the common stops that came with theater organs of the day such as bird calls, car horns, and other sounds necessary to add substance in the silent movie age. The Organ is under the care of the Land of Lincoln Theater Organ Society, which offers year-round tours and demonstrations.

== See also ==
- List of concert halls
- Barton Organ Company
