= John T. Buckbee =

American politician (1871-1936)

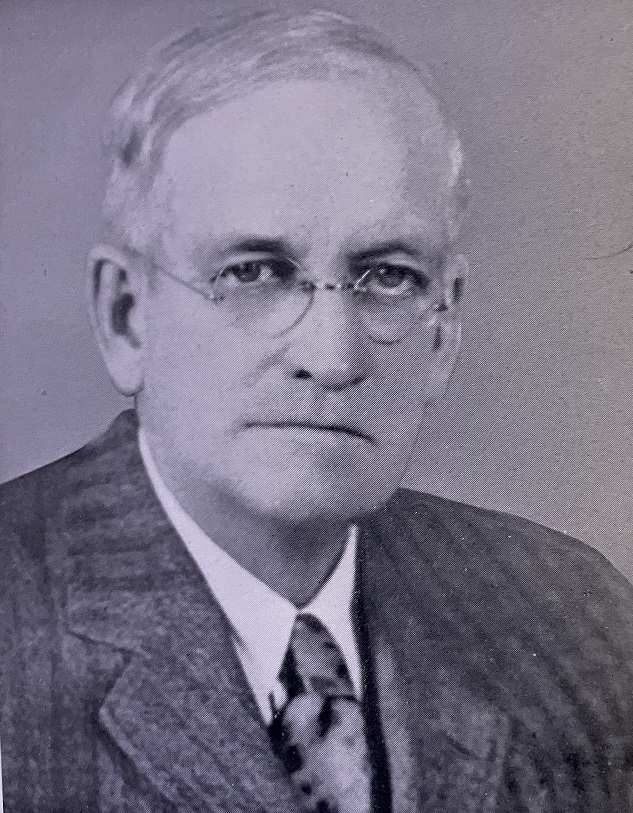
- Frontispiece of 1938's John Theodore Buckbee, Late a Representative

Member of the U.S. House of Representatives from Illinois's 12th district
- In office March 4, 1927 – April 23, 1936
- Preceded by: Charles E. Fuller
- Succeeded by: Noah M. Mason

Personal details
- Born: John Theodore Buckbee; August 1, 1871 near Rockford, Illinois, USA
- Died: April 23, 1936 (aged 64) Rockford, Illinois, USA
- Resting place: Greenwood Cemetery in Rockford, Illinois
- Party: Republican
- Occupation: President, family-owned seed business

John Theodore Buckbee (August 1, 1871 – April 23, 1936) was an American farmer, businessman, and politician who served five terms as a U.S. representative from Illinois from 1927 until his death in 1936.

== Early life and education ==
Born on a farm near Rockford, Illinois, Buckbee attended the public schools of Rockford. He studied agriculture and horticulture in Austria, France, Holland, Denmark, Sweden, Belgium, Italy, and Great Britain.

== Career ==
He served as president of H.W. Buckbee Seeds, which was established in 1871 by his brother, Hiram W. Buckbee, in Rockford, Illinois.

=== Congress ===
Buckbee was elected as a Republican to the Seventieth and to the four succeeding Congresses. He served from March 4, 1927, until his death in Rockford, Illinois, April 23, 1936.

He was not a candidate for renomination in 1936.

== Death and burial ==
He was interred in Greenwood Cemetery in Rockford, Illinois.

== See also ==
- List of members of the United States Congress who died in office (1900–1949)

U.S. House of Representatives
Preceded by Charles E. Fuller	Member of the U.S. House of Representatives from Illinois's 12th congressional district 1927-1936	Succeeded by Noah M. Mason
