= Noah M. Mason =

American politician (1882-1965)

Noah Morgan Mason
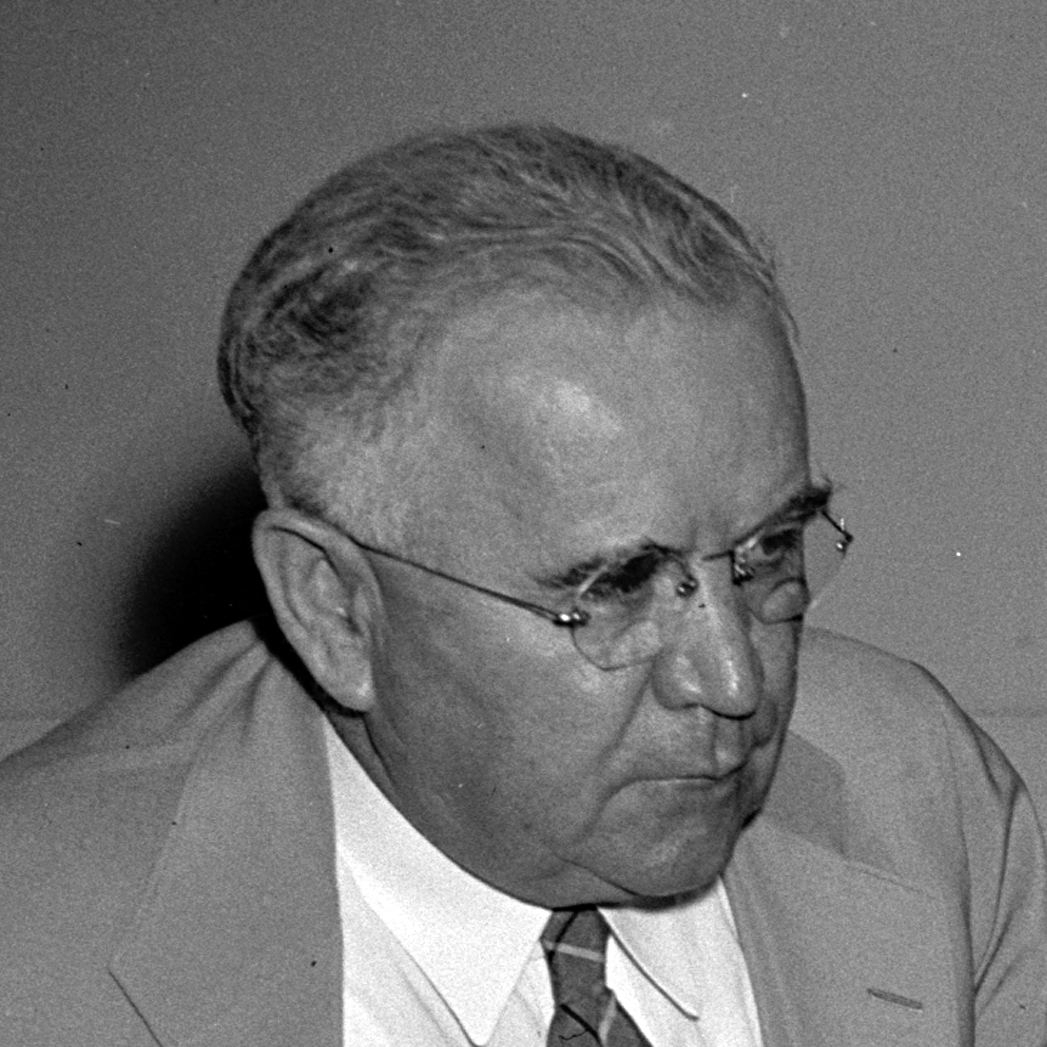
- Mason in 1938

Member of the U.S. House of Representatives from Illinois
- In office January 3, 1937 – January 3, 1963
- Preceded by: John T. Buckbee
- Succeeded by: Charlotte T. Reid
- Constituency: 12th district (1937-1949); 15th district (1949-1963)

Member of the Illinois Senate
- In office 1930–1936

Personal details
- Born: July 19, 1882 Glamorganshire, Wales
- Died: March 29, 1965 (aged 82) Joliet, Illinois, U.S.
- Resting place: Plainfield Cemetery, Plainfield, Illinois, U.S.
- Party: Republican

Noah Morgan Mason (July 19, 1882 – March 29, 1965) was an American politician who was a U.S. representative from Illinois. A conservative Republican, he served 13 terms representing first the state's 12th congressional district and then, after a redrawing of boundaries, the 15th.

== Career ==
Born in Glamorganshire, Wales, the 12th of 13 children, Mason immigrated to the United States in 1888 with his parents, who settled in La Salle, Illinois; his father was a coal miner and then a farmer. He left school at 14 to help on the farm, but at his mother's urging attended Dixon College, and graduated from the Illinois State Normal University at Normal.

He was a teacher and principal of schools at Oglesby, Illinois from 1902 to 1905 and was superintendent of schools from 1908 to 1936. From 1918 to 1926 he was also an Oglesby city commissioner. He served as a member of the Illinois State Normal School Board from 1926 to 1930.

Mason served in the Illinois state senate from 1930 to 1936, and was then elected as a Republican to the 75th United States Congress and was reelected to the twelve succeeding Congresses (January 3, 1937 – January 3, 1963). He served on the Ways and Means Committee, where he was part of the conservative bloc. Mason voted against the Civil Rights Acts of 1957 and 1960, while he voted present on the 24th Amendment to the U.S. Constitution.

Mason was a conservative Republican who represented a rural district west of Chicago. Less flamboyant and less visible than his colleague Everett McKinley Dirksen, he ardently supported states' rights in order to minimize the federal role, for he feared federal regulation of business. He also favored higher tariffs to protect American business and workers, a position that was increasingly unsupported by the wider Republican Party. He distrusted Roosevelt, and made many speeches against high federal spending. He criticised New Dealers, such as Eveline Burns, Henry A. Wallace, Adolph A. Berle, Jr., and Paul Porter, as socialists. He was an isolationist who voted against the Lend-Lease program in 1941. He was a member of the House Un-American Activities Committee (1938–43), and in 1950 he championed Joe McCarthy's exposes. During the Eisenhower administration, while praising the Republican president, he opposed substantially all his initiatives, including statehood for Hawaii, and he supported Senator Pat McCarran in sharply restricting immigration to the US. He advocated a radical rewriting of the tax code.

He was not a candidate for renomination in 1962 for the Eighty-eighth Congress. He retired and lived in Plainfield, Illinois. He died in Joliet, Illinois, and was buried in Plainfield Cemetery in Plainfield.

== See also ==
- List of members of the House Un-American Activities Committee

U.S. House of Representatives
Preceded by John T. Buckbee	Member of the U.S. House of Representatives from Illinois's 12th congressional district January 3, 1937 - January 3, 1949	Succeeded by Edgar A. Jonas
Preceded by Robert B. Chiperfield	Member of the U.S. House of Representatives from Illinois's 15th congressional district January 3, 1949 - January 3, 1963	Succeeded by Charlotte Thompson Reid
