= East Rockford Historic District =

Historic district in Illinois, United States

- U.S. National Register of Historic Places
- U.S. Historic district
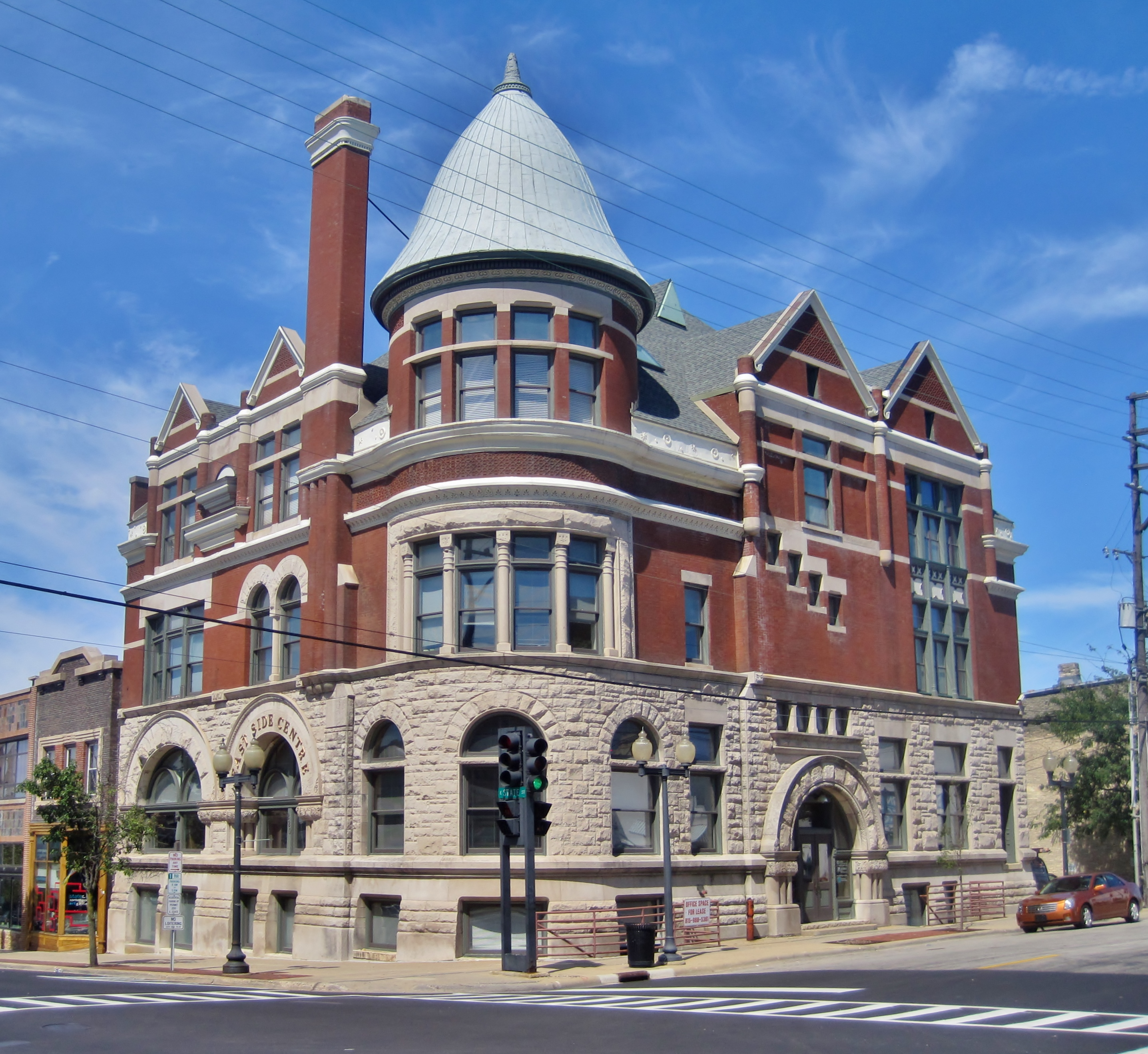
- The Romanesque Old Y.M.C.A. Building

- Location within Illinois Location within the United States
- Location: U.S. 20 and U.S. 51, Rockford, Illinois
- Coordinates: 42.26771°N 89.08759°W
- Area: 6.8 acres (2.8 ha)
- Built: 1855
- Architect: Multiple
- Architectural style: Classical Revival, Late Victorian, Italianate
- NRHP reference No.: 80001422
- Added to NRHP: March 20, 1980

The East Rockford Historic District is a historic commercial area of Rockford, Illinois, United States.

== History ==
Rockford, Illinois was first settled around 1834. As Rockford grew, the east side of the Rock River developed into a commercial district, featuring the post office and the first two hotels. State Street, which runs through the district, became an important transportation corridor between Belvidere and Galena. The first bridge in Rockford was built on State Street across the river in 1852; it was the only crossing until 1890. Also that year, the Galena and Chicago Union Railroad reached the east side of Rockford, built along the eastern riverfront, providing economic stimulus. By 1860, the entirety of State Street from the tracks to Second Street was commercial development. The commercial building at 324–30 East State Street is the lone remnant from this era that has not been substantially altered.

The Civil War and Panic of 1873 halted construction for the next two decades. Prosperity returned in the late 1870s, prompting the construction of the Nash–Superior–Van Zandt Block. The paving of State Street in 1889 brought another wave of construction, including a building for the YMCA and the Germania Hall. The ornate, Romanesque Revival YMCA hall dominated the east side for decades. The Panic of 1893 again slowed development. Further development in Rockford largely centered on the west side district.

The first Rockford City Hall was commissioned in 1904 and completed three years later. The last major east side building of the early 20th century was the Rockford Wholesale Grocery Building in 1909. The YMCA was converted to the East Side Inn in 1911, which stayed in business until the 1970s. The Roaring Twenties provided another period of prosperity for the district, and it was during this period that many of the other significant buildings were constructed. Just before this period, the Midway Theater opened on the east side. J. E. O. Pridmore's design included a 90-foot (27 m) tower. The 95-foot (29 m) Manufacturer's National Bank was constructed in 1925 and the 175-foot (53 m) Faust Hotel was built in 1927. The last major building in the district was the Morning Star Newspaper Building, which featured a seven-story tower.

=== Buildings ===
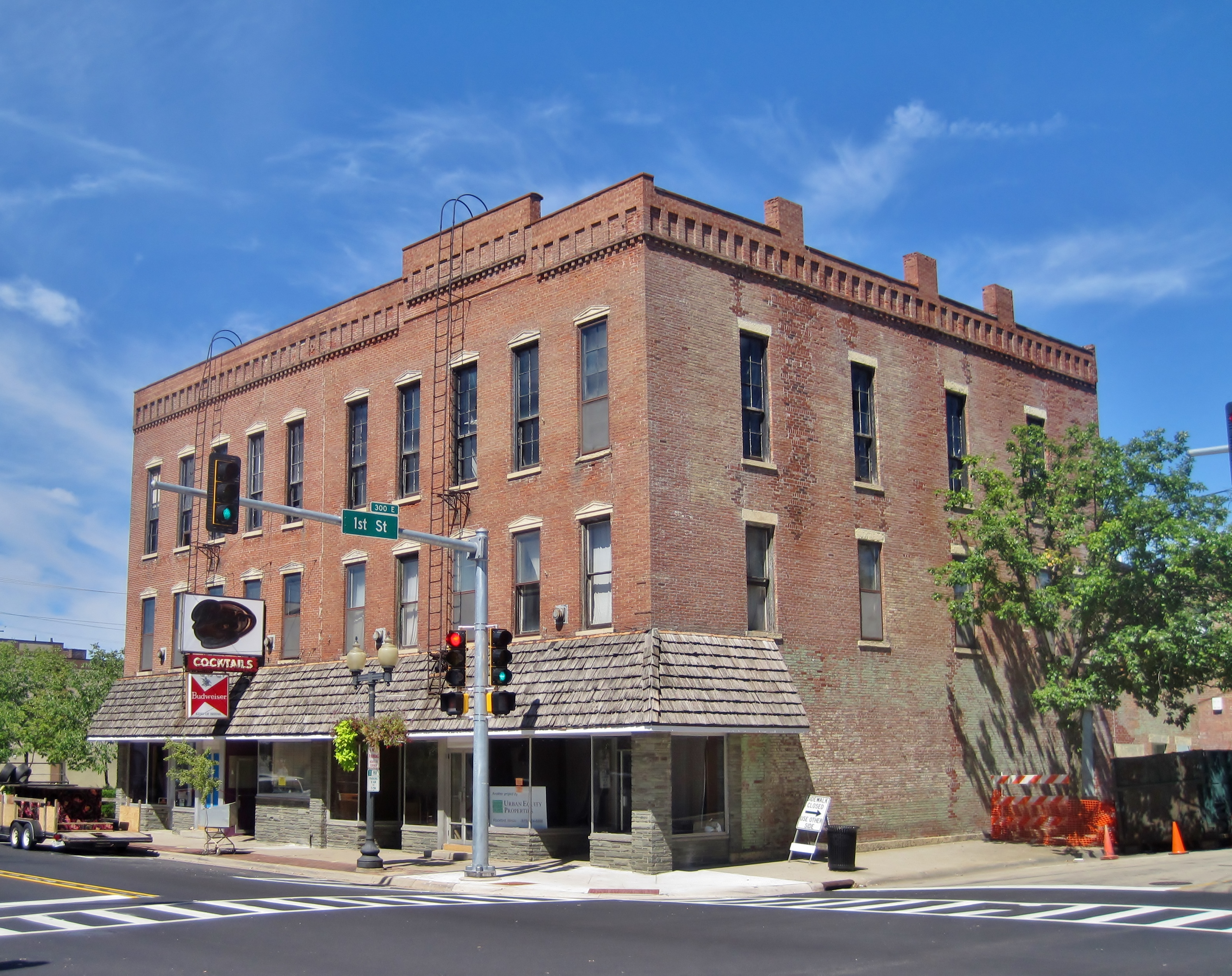
The commercial building at 324–30 East State Street is the oldest in the district

The following buildings contribute to the historical fabric of the district:

- Rockford Wholesale Grocery Building, 1909
- Morning Star Newspaper Building, 1932
- Old Y.M.C.A. Building, 1889
- Germania Hall, 1890
- 324–30 East State Street, c. 1855-60
- Old City Hall, 1907
- Nash–Superior–Van Zandt Block, 1879
- Manufacturer's National Bank, 1925
- Shumway Market, c. 1920
- Midway Theater, 1918
- Faust Hotel, 1927
