= William Lathrop (politician) =

American politician

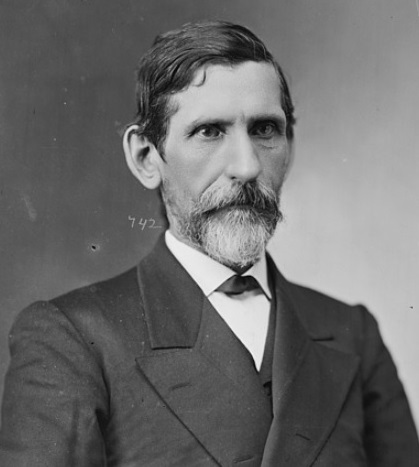
- Brady-Handy Collection, Library of Congress

Member of the U.S. House of Representatives from Illinois's 4th district
- In office March 4, 1877 – March 3, 1879
- Preceded by: Stephen A. Hurlbut
- Succeeded by: John C. Sherwin

Member of the Illinois House of Representatives
- In office 1856-1857

Personal details
- Born: April 17, 1825 Le Roy, New York, U.S.
- Died: November 19, 1907 (aged 82) Rockford, Illinois, U.S.
- Party: Republican
- Spouse: Adeline "Addie" Potter Lathrop (m. 1857)
- Children: 5 (including Julia Lathrop)

William Lathrop (April 17, 1825 – November 19, 1907) was a U.S. representative from Illinois.

Born near Le Roy, New York, Lathrop attended the public schools and an academy at Brockport, New York. He studied law in Attica, New York. He moved to Knoxville, Illinois, and was admitted to the bar in 1850. He settled in Rockford, Illinois, in 1851 and practiced his profession. City clerk and city attorney of Rockford in 1852. He served as member of the State house of representatives in 1856 and 1857.

Lathrop was elected as a Republican to the Forty-fifth Congress (March 4, 1877 – March 3, 1879). He resumed the practice of law in Rockford, Illinois, where he died November 19, 1907. He was interred in Greenwood Cemetery.

U.S. House of Representatives
Preceded by Stephen A. Hurlbut	Member of the U.S. House of Representatives from Illinois's 4th congressional district 1877-1879	Succeeded by John C. Sherwin
