= Germanicus Kent =

Germanicus A. Kent (1791–1862) together with Thatcher Blake and Lewis Lemon founded Rockford, Illinois, United States in 1834.

== Biography ==
Germanicus A. Kent was born in Suffield, Connecticut, in 1791 and attend Yale College. Around 1822, Kent moved to Huntsville, Alabama, establishing himself as a dry goods merchant, marrying Arabella Amiss of Blacksburg, Virginia, on June 7, 1827. Kent was later a cotton merchant as a partner in the firm of Patton, Donegan & Co at the Bell Cotton Factory on the Flint river near Huntsville.

The Kent family, including Lewis Lemon, a slave purchased by Germanicus as a boy, relocated to Illinois in 1834. After exploring the local area, Kent, Lemon and Thatcher Blake, a school teacher and farmer from Oxford, Maine, founded the settlement that was later to be called Rockford in 1834-1835. Germanicus and Arabella's daughter, Mary, was born in Rockford in 1836. They also had younger two sons called Lewis and John. In 1843, the Kent family returned to Arabella's hometown of Blacksburg, Virginia. Arabella died on May 26, 1851, and from 1856 Germanicus lived with his daughter, (now Mary Black) in Blacksburg until his death on March 1, 1862.

== Memorials ==
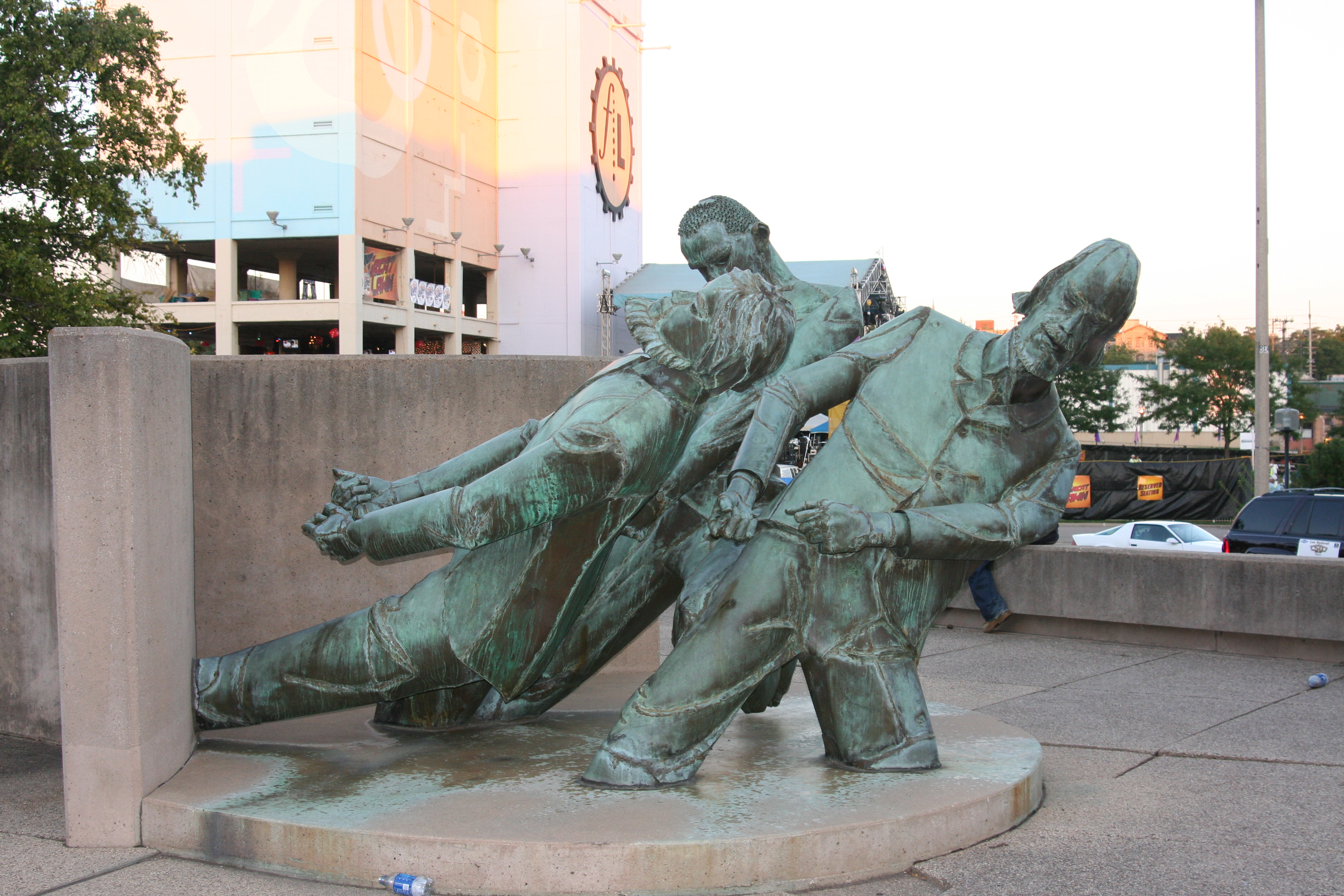
Founders Memorial, Rockford, Illinois

In 1976, a statue called "Pulling Together" depicting a stylized scene of the founders of Rockford dragging their supply wagon through a swamp was unveiled as part of the Founders Memorial on Wyman Street Bypass, Rockford.
