= Memorial Hall (Rockford, Illinois) =

- Soldiers and Sailors Memorial Hall
- U.S. National Register of Historic Places
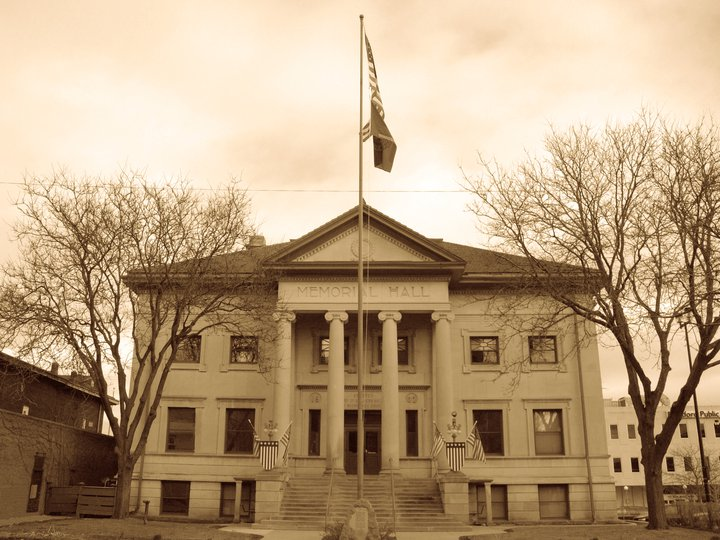

- Location within Illinois
- Location: 211-215 N. Main St., Rockford, Illinois
- Coordinates: 42°16′21″N 89°05′35″W
- Area: 0.4 acres (0.16 ha)
- Built: 1903
- Architectural style: Classical Revival
- NRHP reference No.: 76000731
- Added to NRHP: January 31, 1976

Veterans Memorial Hall and Museum (formerly known as Soldiers and Sailors Memorial Hall) one of the oldest museums in Winnebago County, Illinois, United States is located one block west of the Rock River in downtown Rockford, Illinois. Construction on the Hall began in 1901 and was finished in 1902, but dedication was delayed. On June 3, 1903, President Theodore Roosevelt. visited Rockford for the opening and dedication of what was then known as Soldiers and Sailors Memorial Hall. Although initially conceived to honor Winnebago County veterans of the Mexican–American War, American Civil War, and Spanish-American War, supporters of the hall adapted it to honor Winnebago County veterans of all decades. The building is administered by the Winnebago County Board.

== Description ==
The architecture of Veterans Memorial Hall is classical Greek revival meaning that two sides are identical. The building has stairs with columns and doubles doors on the east and west sides, making them visually identical sides. Decorative façades of Indiana Bedford limestone cover all four sides of the building. Carved in the stone portico of the building on the west façade are the words "Soldiers and Sailors Memorial Hall" and the date "1902". The red tile roof is topped with a skylight. Flagpoles stand on both the east and west sides of the building and a sign acknowledging Main Street as a Blue Star Highway graces the west side garden.

The lawn on the east side of the building underwent extensive renovation in 2016. It is now home to the Armistice-Memorial to Peace, which is a memorial to honor Veterans and educate the community of past Armistice/Veterans Day events at its location as well as inform visitors about the County owned Civil War Statue mounted on a column from Rockford's original Carnegie Library.

Veterans Memorial Hall contains three floors, including the basement, all of which are serviced by an elevator. An auditorium and stage take up most of the upper floor. Numerous museum exhibits fill the main floor and the basement level also has exhibits and conference space. The building continues to serve its original mission of honoring local veterans as a museum of all wars. The interior walls are elaborately painted with symbols and names associated with the Civil War and the Civil War veterans’ associations, The Spanish–American War Veterans and the Grand Army of the Republic. Permanente exhibits include large wall mounted bronze plaques containing the names of those from Winnebago County who fought and died in the Civil War. Over time, several paintings were irreparably damaged or lost due to poor maintenance and pollution; others have been covered up or painted over.

== History ==
=== Construction ===
The idea of a memorial to honor the veterans from Winnebago County was brought up as early as 1866 when W.P. Kinney, minister of the Second Congregational Church, proposed some sort of monument to honor the memory of the 2,109 soldiers and sailors from Winnebago County that served in the American Civil War. In March 1877, John D. Jackson made an unsuccessful proposal to the Winnebago County Board seeking $25,000 for the construction of a soldier's monument.

In 1900, the question of a Memorial Hall was put to voters of Winnebago County; the vote ended in favor of a memorial, at 6,021 to 2,757. In December of that year, Thomas G. Lawler, commander of the Garrett L. Nevius Post #1 of the Grand Army of the Republic (GAR), presented a petition with signatures from than 200 veterans requesting the county build a Memorial Hall. The petition asked that the hall not only act as a memorial for veterans of the county but also be used for other county purposes.

The building was designed by Bradley & Carpenter, a local architectural firm. Construction began in early 1901. The facades were built with Indiana Bedford limestone quarried from the Bedford, Indiana quarry. Construction of Memorial Hall was completed in 18 months for a total cost of $59,136.

=== Dedication ===
In February 1903, a committee of five including: J.B. Whitehead, Col. Thomas L. Lawler, Amasa Hutchins, Col. Arthur E. Fisher, and William Andrews, was named to draft a letter of invitation to President Theodore Roosevelt to be present at the dedication. This committee was authorized to outline the program for the day. On June 3, 1903, a reception committee of leading citizens from Rockford and Winnebago County met Roosevelt at the train station, open carriages transported him and his party to Memorial Hall. Afterward, he raised a flag which had been flown on the Milwaukee-class vessel USS Winnebago during the Civil War.

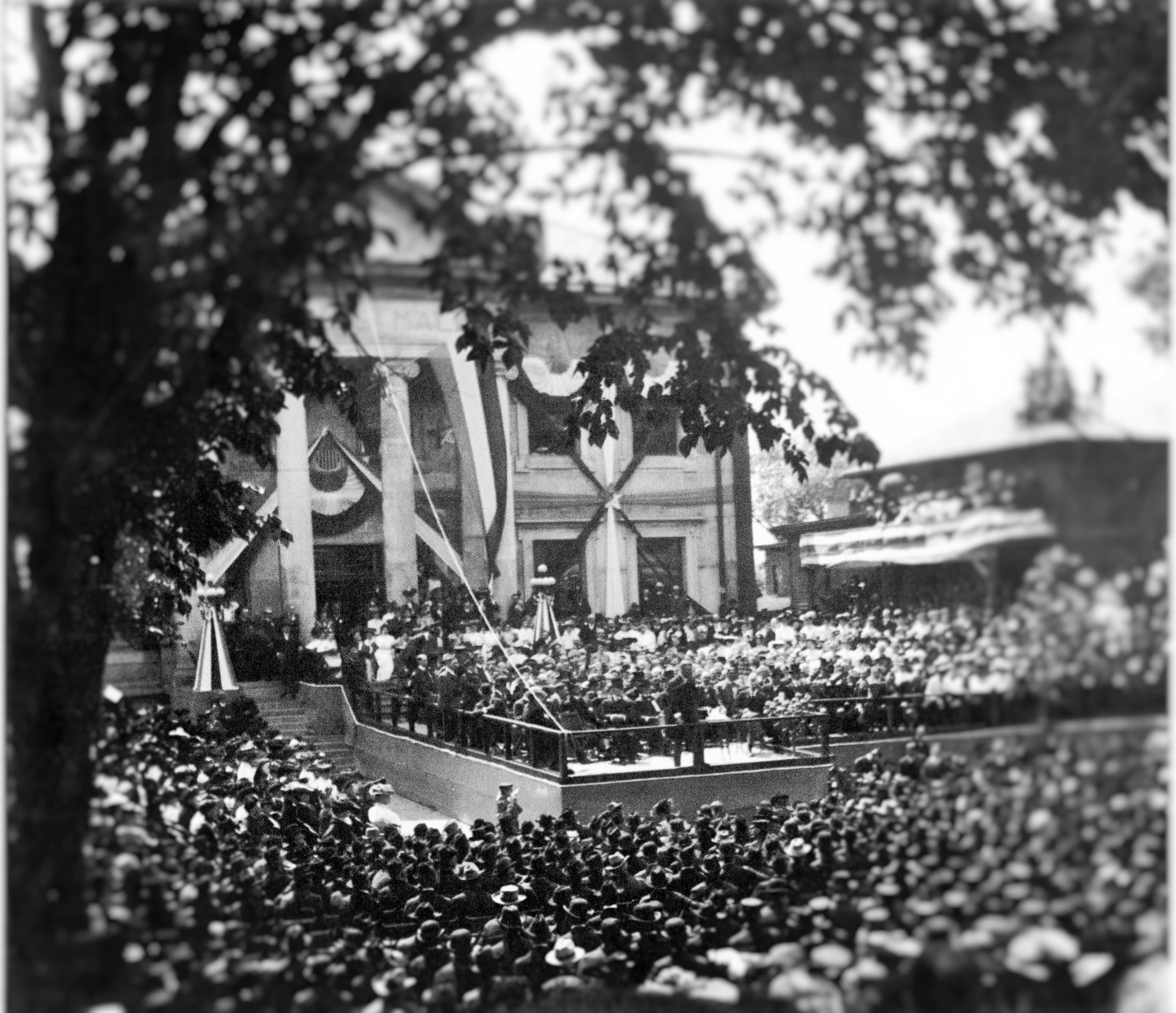
Crowds present to hear President T. Roosevelt dedicate the Memorial Hall

Roosevelt returned to Rockford two more times; once on April 6, 1912, and again on September 26, 1917, when he addressed the troops at nearby Camp Grant during World War I.

=== The Hall ===
On the same day that Roosevelt dedicated Memorial Hall, the local Civil War veterans held their first meeting in the building. Over the century of existence, Memorial Hall has hosted a total of over 60 different veterans or associated military groups for various events and meetings. In 1966, a large stone marker commemorating the Hall's dedication was placed on the west side of the building in front of the entrance, and in 1973, a small garden dedicated to the veterans of the Vietnam War was added.

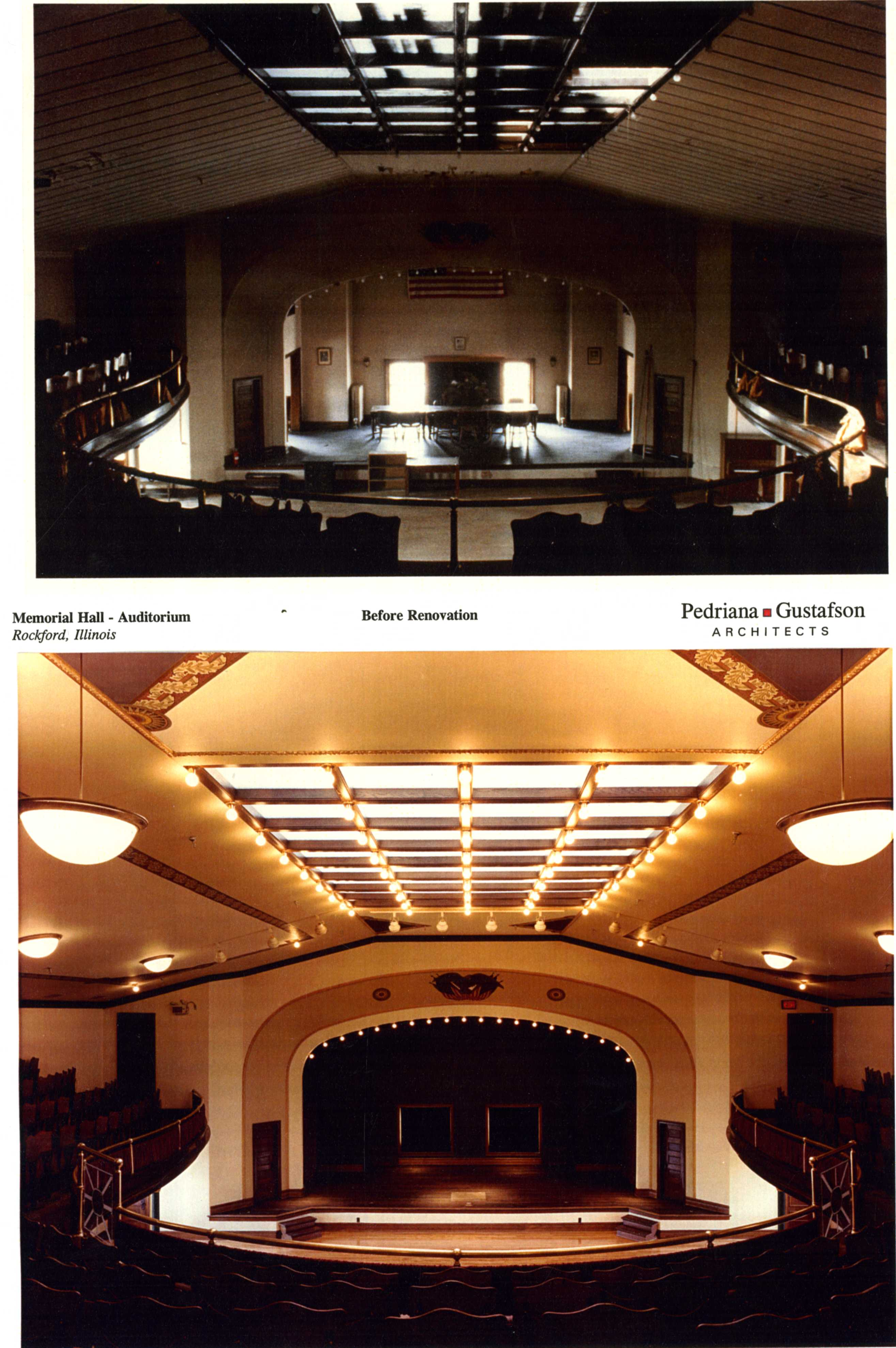
Before, after of restoration of the Lincoln Lyceum

During the Camp Grant era the Memorial Hall, as it was still called, was on a list of suggested places for soldiers to visit. The Relief Corps and other Veteran groups served low-cost meals to soldiers and hosted social events for the soldiers in WW1 and WW2.

In November 1944 Rockford Nevius Post 1 of the G.A.R. officially disbands and hands over control of the Hall to the VFW. Unfortunately the building continues to deteriorate and begins to fall further into disrepair.

The Hall was threatened with demolition in the 1960s when the County Board proposed to demolish the hall in favor of building a parking ramp in order to extend the parking lot located next to it. The Hall's future was assured when, in 1974, the building was named an Illinois Historical Landmark. In 1976, Memorial Hall was placed on the National Register of Historic Places in time for the United States Bicentennial. In 1978, a federal grant matched $25,000 in renovation funds for work on the heating, wiring and insulation. However, by the late 1980s, the building had deteriorated so much that it needed major renovations, repairs and modernization. A County Board committee, including Rep. Dave Winters and Peggy McGaw (wife of former Mayor Robert McGaw) was formed to develop a plan. Working with the City who provided War Memorial funds which came from the sale of Camp Grant, a four-year $1.5 million restoration project began in 1988.

Phase one included the main floor and downstairs; phase two, the landscaping and phase three: the auditorium. Under the eye of architect Joe Zimmer, the building was restored. In 1988, a four-year, $1.5 million restoration project began in response to the parking garage attempt and the fact the building had started to deteriorate due to lack of maintenance. In the 1980s, to help offset the costs of its upkeep, the Winnebago County Board rented the first floor offices to the Rockford Convention and Visitor's Bureau, until early 2004. During that time, in November 2001, the Memorial Hall Board of Trustees was formed to oversee the Hall, its maintenance and its exhibits, as well as to author a report on future operations. In January 2005, Memorial Hall was officially reopened to the public for guided tours.

Exhibits include the 18 bronze plaques containing the names of those from Winnebago County who fought and died in the Civil War, along with memorabilia form veterans extending from the Civil War to the current Iraq conflict. Some articles on display include a commemorative plaque cast of metal from the wreck of the USS Maine, artifacts from a local soldiers time serving the Philippine-American War and Mexican–American War, and items form a local Air Force veterans that spent 6 years at the Hanoi Hilton. Other artifacts from 20th & 21st century veterans are on display, with a constant rotation of smaller exhibits.

== See also ==
- 74th Illinois Infantry Regiment
